= Decline of the Mughal Empire =

Period in Indian history, c. 1712–1857

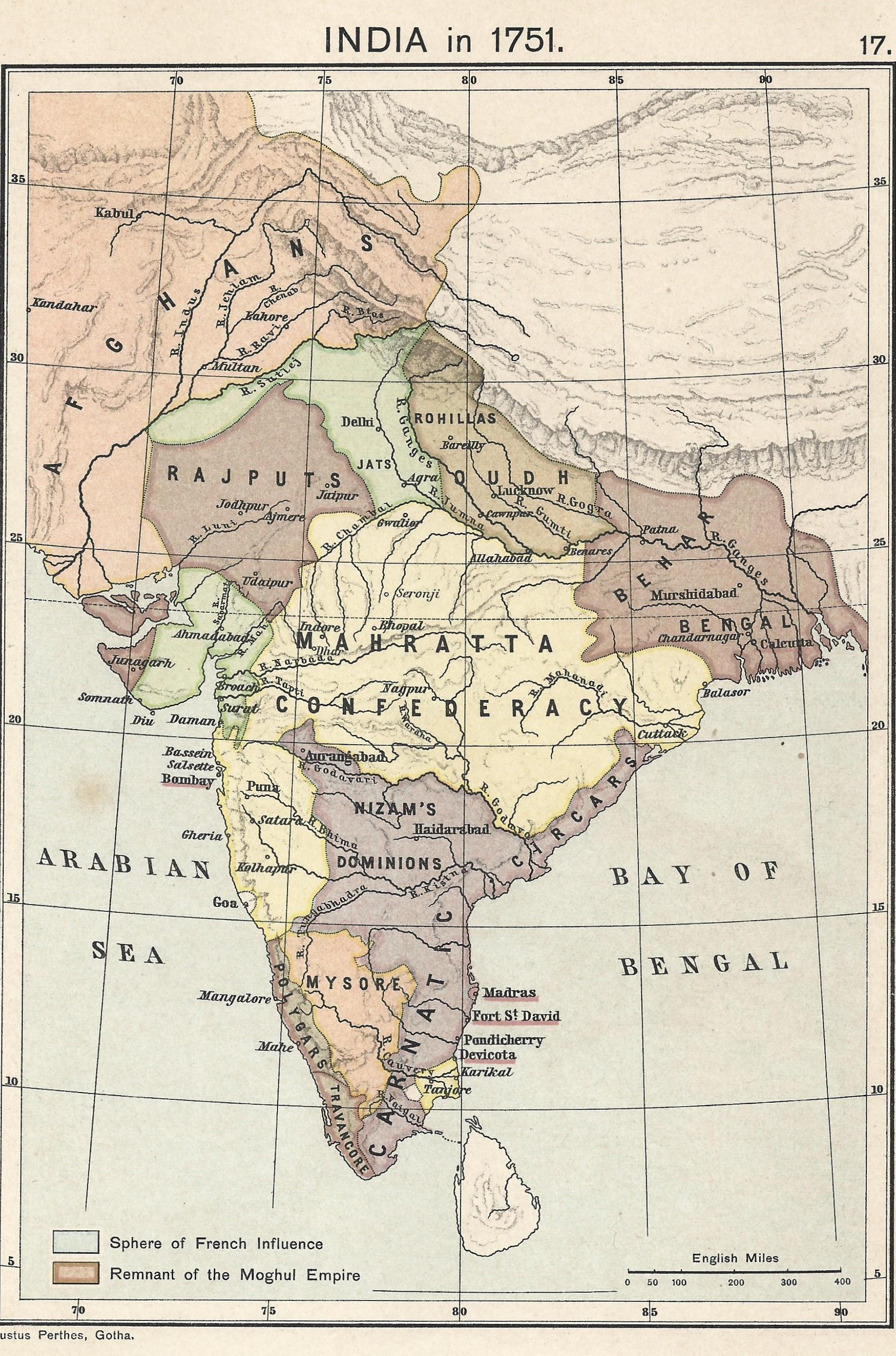
India in 1751

The decline of the Mughal Empire was a period in Indian history roughly between the early 18th century and mid-19th century during which the Mughal Empire, which once dominated the subcontinent, experienced a sharp decline. Several factors are frequently cited to be responsible for the decline, including the wars of succession, various rebellions (Maratha, Rajput, Sikh and Jat), the Afghan and Iranian invasions, and the rise of the British East India Company. The period is usually considered to have begun with the death of Bahadur Shah I in 1712 and ended with the deposition of Bahadur Shah II in 1857. A number of provinces became hereditary vassal monarchies who ruled nominally in the name of the emperor. All powers, including the Marathas and British, nominally ruled in the name of the emperor, and the politics of the era was marked by these powers trying to gain a larger influence over the emperor than the other.

Several historians have debated the cause of decline. Irfan Habib argues the excessive exploitation of the peasantry by the rich (the agrarian crisis), which stripped away the will and the means to support the regime causing the empire to collapse. Habib developed this argument at length in The Agrarian System of Mughal India 1556–1707 as the agrarian crisis, characterised by peasant flight, zamindar militarisation, and a widening gap between assessed (jama) and realised (hasil) revenue. William Dalrymple largely attributes the decline to the rigid religious policies under Aurangzeb and the Deccan Wars. Jeffrey G. Williamson argues that the South Asian economy underwent deindustrialization in the later half of the 18th century as an indirect outcome of the collapse of the Mughal Empire, local supply-side influences such as political and economic fragmentation, and global commodity price shocks, which led to a decline in agricultural productivity that drove up food prices, nominal wages and textile prices. Williamson further argues that this led to India losing a share of the world textile market to Britain.

Karen Leonard focuses on the failure of the regime to work with Hindu bankers. In a religious interpretation, some scholars argue that the Hindu powers revolted against the rule of a Muslim dynasty. Some historians assert such orthodox policies resulting in decline of Mughal power in the Indian subcontinent. Aurangzeb imposed Islamic orthodoxy based on the Fatawa 'Alamgiri. This resulted in the persecution of Shias, Sufis and non-Muslims. G. N. Moin Shakir and Sarma Festschrift argue that he often used political opposition as pretext for religious persecution, resulting in revolts of groups of Jats, Marathas, Sikhs, Satnamis and Pashtuns.

Other scholars argue that the very prosperity of the Empire inspired the provinces to achieve a high degree of independence, thus weakening the imperial court. Aurangzeb's son, Bahadur Shah I, repealed the religious policies of his father and attempted to reform the administration. However, after he died in 1712, the Mughal dynasty began to sink into chaos and violent feuds. In 1719 alone, four emperors successively ascended the throne.

== Mughal war of succession (1707–1709) ==
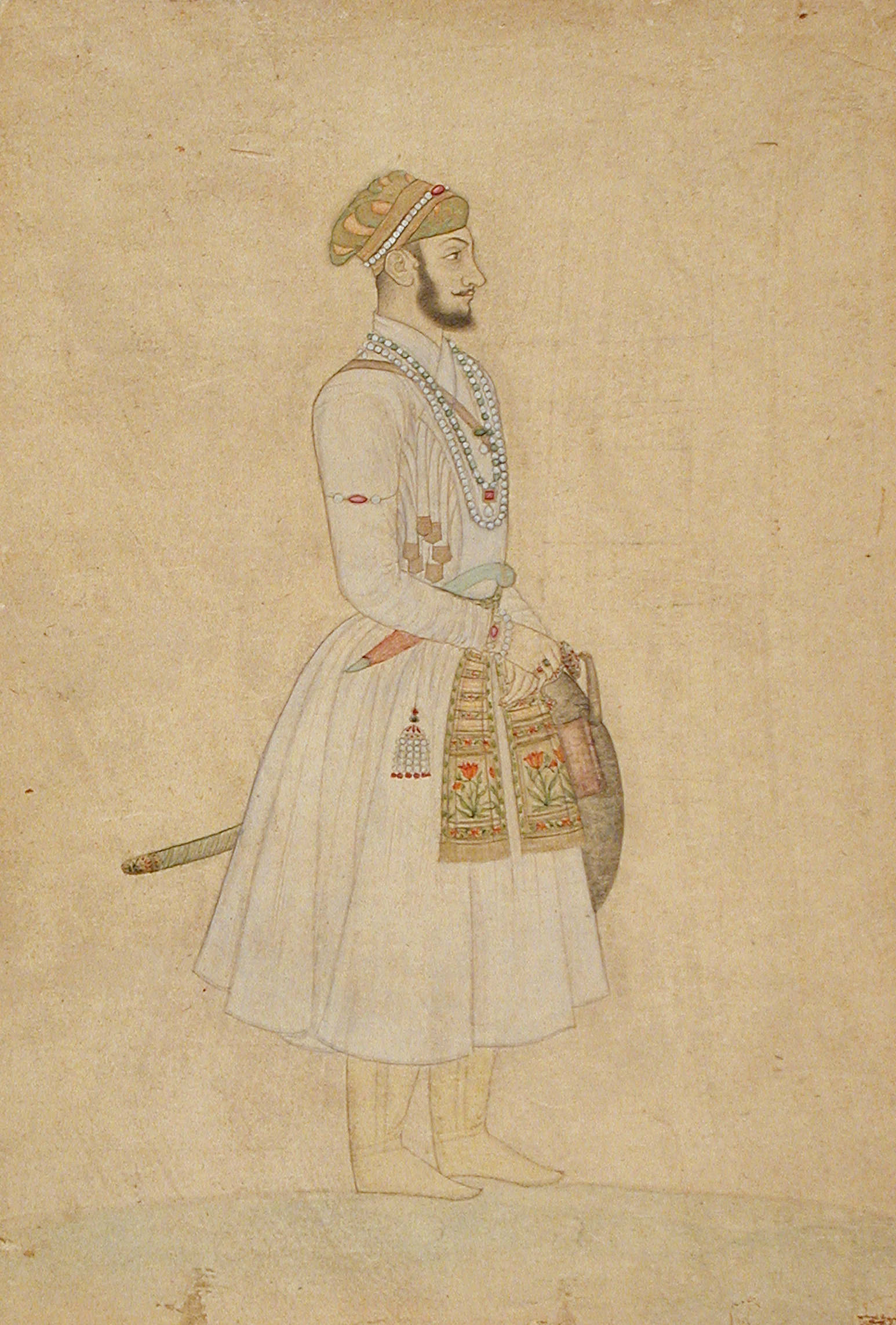
Bahadur Shah I was crowned the Mughal Emperor in 1707.

Following the Deccan Wars, the three sons of Aurangzeb, Bahadur Shah I, Muhammad Azam Shah, and Muhammad Kam Bakhsh fought each other for the throne. Muhammad Azam Shah lived in Ahmednagar. Khafi Khan suggested that whoever reached the capital city of Agra first would capture the throne. The distances to Agra from Jamrud and Ahmednagar were 715 and 700 miles, respectively. Azam Shah and Bahadur Shah were involved in the Battle of Jajau, south of Agra, on 20 June 1707. Azam Shah and his three sons were killed in the battle and were buried with other royals in Humayun's Tomb in Delhi.

Bahadur Shah's half-brother, Muhammad Kam Bakhsh, marched to Bijapur in March 1707 with his soldiers. When the news of Aurangzeb's death spread through the city, the city's monarch, King Sayyid Niyaz Khan surrendered the fort to Baksh without a fight. In May 1708, Bahadur Shah sent a letter to Kam Bakhsh warning that he hoped would prevent him from proclaiming himself an independent sovereign. Bahadur Shah then began a journey to the Tomb of Aurangzeb to pay his respects to his father. Kam Bakhsh replied, thanking him "without either explaining or justifying [his actions]".

When Bahadur Shah reached Hyderabad on 28 June 1708, he learned that Kam Bakhsh had attacked Machilipatnam (Bandar) in an attempt seize over three million rupees worth of treasure hidden in its fort. The subahdar of the province, Jan Sipar Khan, refused to hand over the money. Enraged, Kam Bakhsh confiscated his properties and ordered the recruitment of four thousand soldiers for the attack. In July, the garrison at the Gulbarga Fort declared its independence and garrison leader Daler Khan Bijapuri "reported his desertion from Kam Bakhsh". On 20 December 1708, Kam Bakhsh marched towards Talab-i-Mir Jumla, on the outskirts of Hyderabad, with "three hundred camels, [and] twenty thousand rockets" for war with Bahadur Shah. Although Kam Bakhsh had little money and few soldiers left, the royal astrologer had predicted that he would "miraculously" win the battle. At sunrise the following day, Bahadur Shah's army charged towards Kam Bakhsh. His 15,000 troops were divided into two bodies: one led by Mumin Khan, assisted by Rafi-ush-Shan and Jahan Shah, and the second under Zulfiqar Khan Nusrat Jung. Two hours later Kam Bakhsh's camp was surrounded, and Zulfiqar Khan impatiently attacked him with his "small force". With his soldiers outnumbered and unable to resist the attack, Kam Bakhsh joined the battle and shot two quivers of arrows at his opponents. A dispute arose between Mumin Khan and Zulfikar Khan Nusrat Jung over who had captured them, with Rafi-us-Shan ruling in favor of the latter. Bahadur Shah I was crowned the Mughal emperor after the conflicts.

== Later civil wars ==
After the death of Bahadur Shah I, a war of succession brow out between his sons in which Jahandar Shah was victorious. Unlike previous Mughal wars of succession, the outcome of this war was engineered by a noble, Zulfiqar Khan. He built an alliance between Jahandar Shah, and his younger brothers Rafi-us-Shan and Jahan Shah, proposing to them that they could divide the empire between them upon victory (with Zulfiqar Khan serving as their common mir bakhshi). Azim-us-Shan was defeated and killed, following which Jahandar Shah broke the alliance and turned on his brothers, defeating them and killing them with the help of Zulfiqar Khan, emerging as the victor of the succession struggle.

Farrukhsiyar defeated Jahandar Shah with the aid of the Sayyid brothers, and one of the brothers, Abdullah Khan. According to historian William Irvine, Farrukhsiyar's close aides Mir Jumla III and Khan Dauran sowed seeds of suspicion in his mind that they might usurp him from the throne.

=== Syed brothers ===
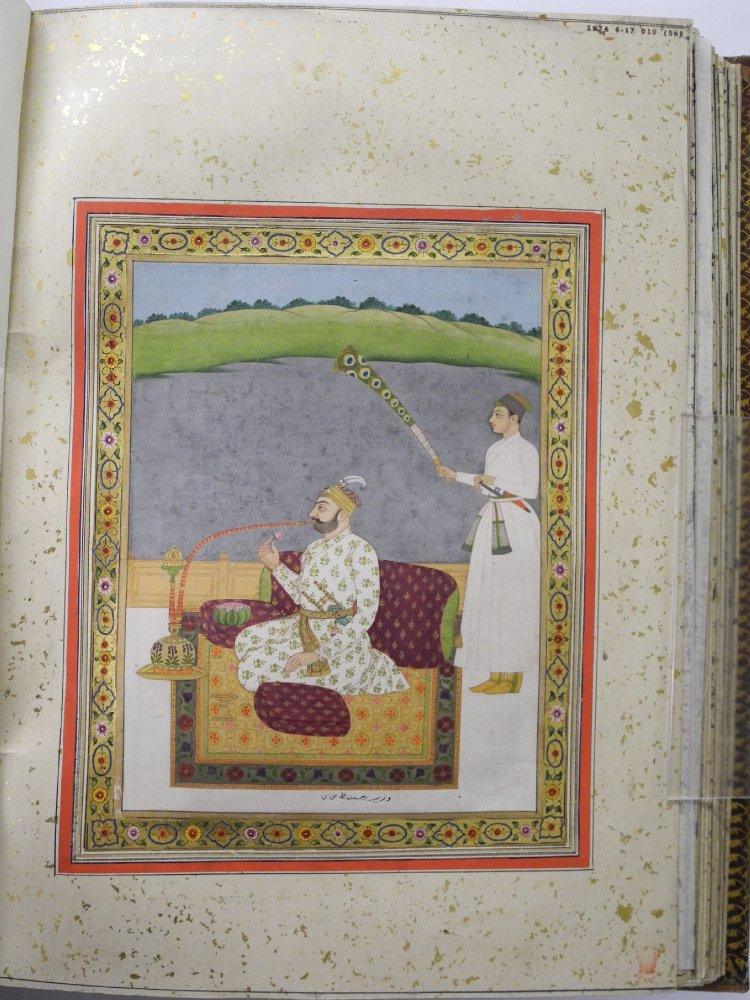
Hussain Ali Khan Barha

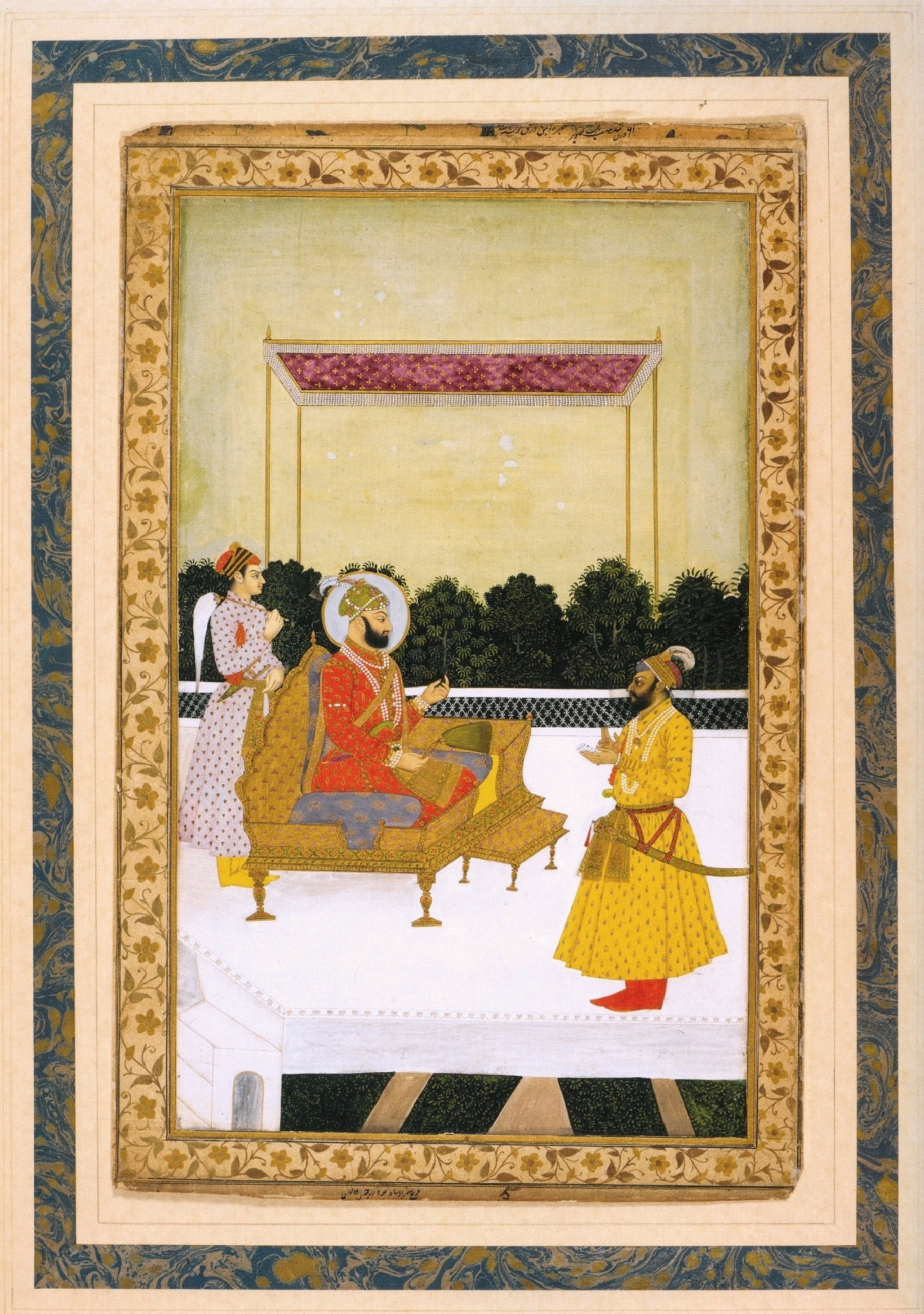
Hassan Ali Khan Barha

During the reign of the Aurangzeb in 1697, Hassan Ali Khan and Hussain Ali Khan were appointed into Mughal administration. They were Indian Muslims belonging to the Sadaat-e-Bara clan of the Barha dynasty, who claimed to be Sayyids or the descendants of the Islamic prophet Muhammad. The brothers became highly influential in the Mughal Court after Aurangzeb's death in 1707 and became de facto sovereigns of the empire when they began to make and unmake emperors.

After Prince Mu'izz ud-Din Jahandar Shah, the eldest of Emperor Bahadur Shah's sons, had been appointed in 1695 to the charge of the Multan province. When Emperor Aurangzeb died and Prince Muhammad Mu'azzam Shah Alam, reached Lahore on his march to Agra to contest the throne, the Sayyids presented themselves, and their services were gladly accepted. In the Battle of Jajau or Jajowan on the 18th Rabi I, 1119 H. (18 June 1707), they served in the vanguard and fought valiantly on foot, as was the Sayyid habit in an emergency. The two Sayyids managed to quarrel with Khanazad Khan, the vizier Munim Khan's second son, and offended Jahandar Shah, though the breach was healed by a visit to them from the vizier in person, there is little doubt that this difference helped to keep them out of employment.

== Rajput rebellions ==
In the late 17th century, various Rajput noblemen previously loyal to the Mughal crown, revolted and carved out their own independent kingdoms. These revolts lasted throughout the 17th and 19th centuries.

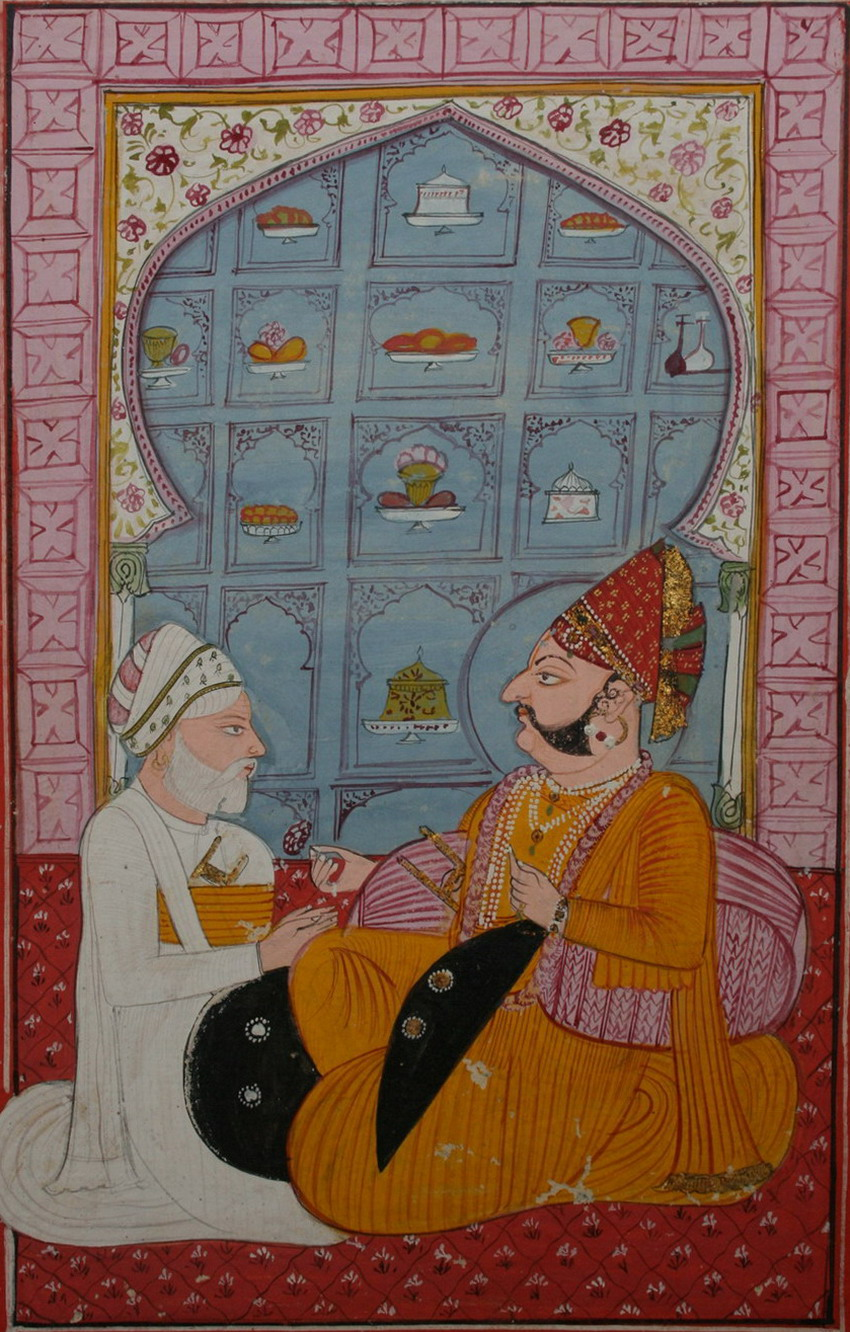
Durgadas Rathore and Ajit Singh

The Rathore rebellion, was fought Rajputs of Marwar and the Mughals started after the death of Jaswant Singh of Marwar, due to Aurangzeb's attempt to interfere in the succession of Marwar. On 23 July 1679, Aurangzeb made attempts to divide Marwar into two Rathore principalities, one held by Inder Singh Rathore and other by Ajit Singh. Aurangzeb also proposed that Ajit Singh should be raised as a Muslim and offered Jodhpur in return. The Jodhpur nobles led by Durgadas opposed this decision, upon which Aurangzeb tried to imprison the infant prince Ajit Singh.

Upon hearing of this news, the Marwar loyalists led by Sonig Rathore and Ram Bhati captured the fort of Jodhpur from the Mughal officers, Tahir Beg and Tahawar Khan. Other loyalists like Sujan Singh also captured the forts of Siwana and Merta. Prince Akbar was sent with an army to occupy Jodhpur. The Rajputs made headstrong and suicidal attacks on the Mughals, but they were unable to stop their advance towards Jodhpur, which was soon occupied by Akbar.

After the death of Raj Singh, Aurangzeb was able to sue for peace with Mewar, upon which the new Rana was forced to give away some land and promise not to help Ajit Singh. In 1686, Durgadas returned and won several victories against the Mughals, prompting Shujaat Khan, the Mughal governor of Gujarat and Jodhpur, to lead an intensive campaign against the Rathors. Hostilities thus continued until Aurangzeb's death, after which Jodhpur was captured by the Rathores. Bahadur Shah I would invade Marwar again, resulting in the Rajput Rebellion of 1708–1710.

R. C. Majumdar wrote:

The Rajput wars of Aurangzeb produced disastrous consequences for his Empire. Thousands of lives were sacrificed and enormous sums were wasted on the desert land without any lasting success to the emperor.

=== Rajput Rebellion (1708–1710) ===
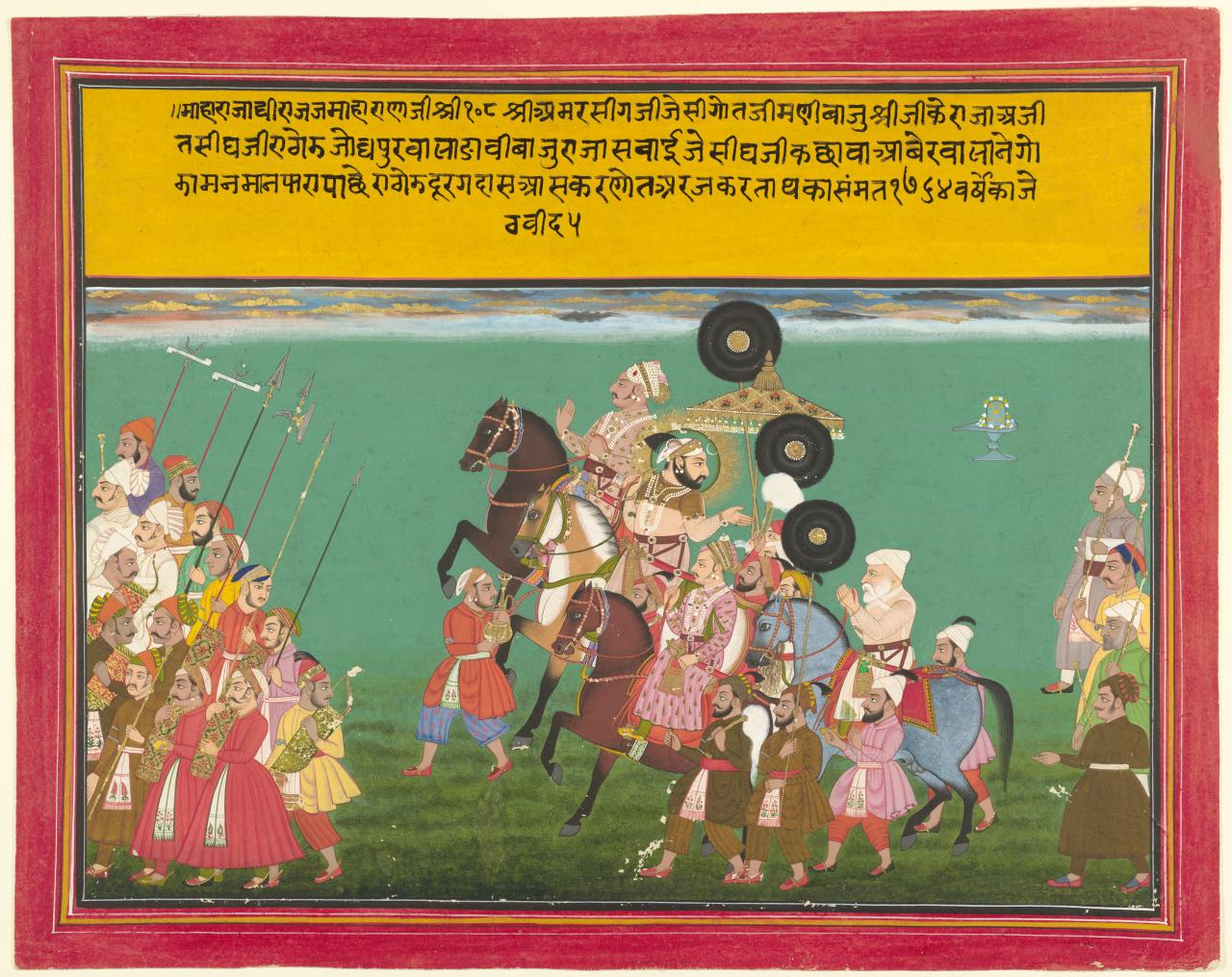
A Mewari painting of Ajit Singh, Amar Singh II, Maharaja Jai Singh II and Durgadas Rathore

Various Rajput nobles including Ajit Singh, Amar Singh II, Maharaja Jai Singh II and Durgadas Rathore formed an alliance and revolted against the Mughal crown in 1708.

Bahadur Shah I was forced to move south and could not come back till 12 June 1710. Jodhpur was captured in July and Amber in October 1708. Sayyid Hussain Barha and Churaman Jat were sent with a large force to retake Amber, however Barha was shot dead with his brothers and the Mughals were defeated. Three thousand Mughals were killed at Sambhar. Jai Singh in his letter to Chattrasal has written that "among the dead were all three Faujdars". The Rajputs also took all the Mughal treasury of Sambhar and distributed it among the people. When Bahadur Shah got to know of this defeat, he immediately tried to sue for peace by offering to restore Ajit Singh and Jai Singh to their thrones, however the Rajputs demanded the restoration of their lands that had been forcefully taken by Aurangzeb in 1679 and the expulsion of the Mughals from Rajputana.

When Bahadur Shah returned, he had no choice but to negotiate with the Rajputs. Gifts and letters were sent to the two rebel Rajas in May 1710. The rise of Banda Singh Bahadur and death of Wazir Khan, faujdar of Sirhind, further caused fear in the Mughal court and on 11 June 1710 Jai Singh and Ajit Singh were invited to the Mughal court and were given robes of honour, presents and governorships of Malwa and Gujarat.

== War with the Marathas ==
=== Early conflicts ===
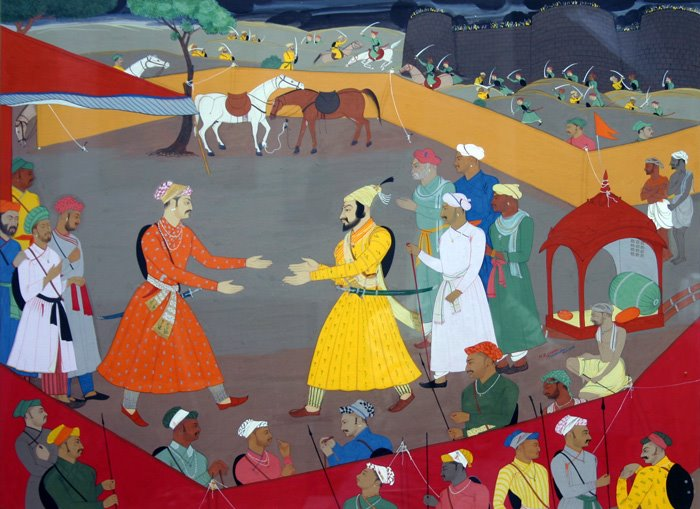
Jai Singh meets Shivaji after the Battle of Purandar.

The Maratha Empire was founded by Shivaji. He led a resistance against the Sultanate of Bijapur in 1645 by winning the fort Torna, followed by many more forts, placing the area under his control. He created an independent Maratha kingdom with Raigad as its capital and successfully fought against the Mughals to defend his kingdom.

In 1665 the Marathas under Shivaji sacked Surat, a wealthy Mughal port city. The Maratha soldiers took away cash, gold, silver, pearls, rubies, diamonds & emeralds from the houses of rich merchants such as Virji Vora, Haji Zahid Beg, Haji Kasim and others. The business of Mohandas Parekh, the deceased broker of the Dutch East India Company, was spared as he was reputed as a charitable man. In 1660 in the Shaista Khan defeated Maratha forces under Firangoji Narsala. Shaista Khan's residence in Pune was later attacked by Shivaji. Mughal Commander Jai Singh defeated Shivaji in Battle of Purandar in 1665.

=== Deccan wars ===
Mughal and Maratha forces clashed in the 27 years long Deccan Wars. Shivaji's son Sambhaji engaged a rebellion against the Mughal state and service to the Mughal sovereign in an official capacity. It was common practice in late 17th-century India for members of a ruling family of a small principality to both collaborate with the Mughals and rebel.

In 1681, Sambhaji was contacted by Prince Akbar, the Mughal emperor Aurangzeb's son, who was keen to enter into a partnership with the Marathas in order to assert his political power against his ageing father's continuing dominance. Akbar spent several years under the protection of Sambhaji but eventually went into exile to Persia in 1686. Sambhaji was later executed by Mughal forces in 1689. at the age of 31. His death was a significant event in Indian history, marking the end of the golden era of the Maratha Empire. Sambhaji's wife and minor son, later named Shahuji was taken into the Mughal camp, and Rajaram, who was now an adult, was re-established as ruler; he quickly moved his base to Gingee, far into the Tamil country. From here, he was able to frustrate Mughal advances into the Deccan until 1700. In 1689, Sambhaji's son Shahu was taken prisoner along with his mother by Mughals after the Battle of Raigarh.

Constant warfare in Deccan, especially with the Marathas, largely contributed in the bankruptcy and decline of the Mughal Empire. The Indologist Stanley Wolpert, emeritus professor at UCLA, says that:

The conquest of the Deccan, to which Aurangzeb devoted the last twenty-six years of his life, was in many ways a Pyrrhic victory, costing an estimated hundred thousand lives a year during its last decade of fruitless, chess-game warfare ... The expense in gold and rupees can hardly be imagined or accurately estimated. Alamgir's moving capital alone-a city of tents thirty miles in circumference, two hundred and fifty bazaars, with half a million camp followers, fifty thousand camels, and thirty thousand elephants, all of whom had to be fed, stripped peninsular India of any and all of its surplus grain and wealth ... Not only famine, but bubonic plague arose ... Even Alamgir had ceased to understand the purpose for it all by ... 1705. The emperor was nearing ninety by then ... "I came alone and I go as a stranger. I do not know who I am, nor what I have been doing," the dying old man confessed to his son in February 1707.

=== Maratha invasions ===
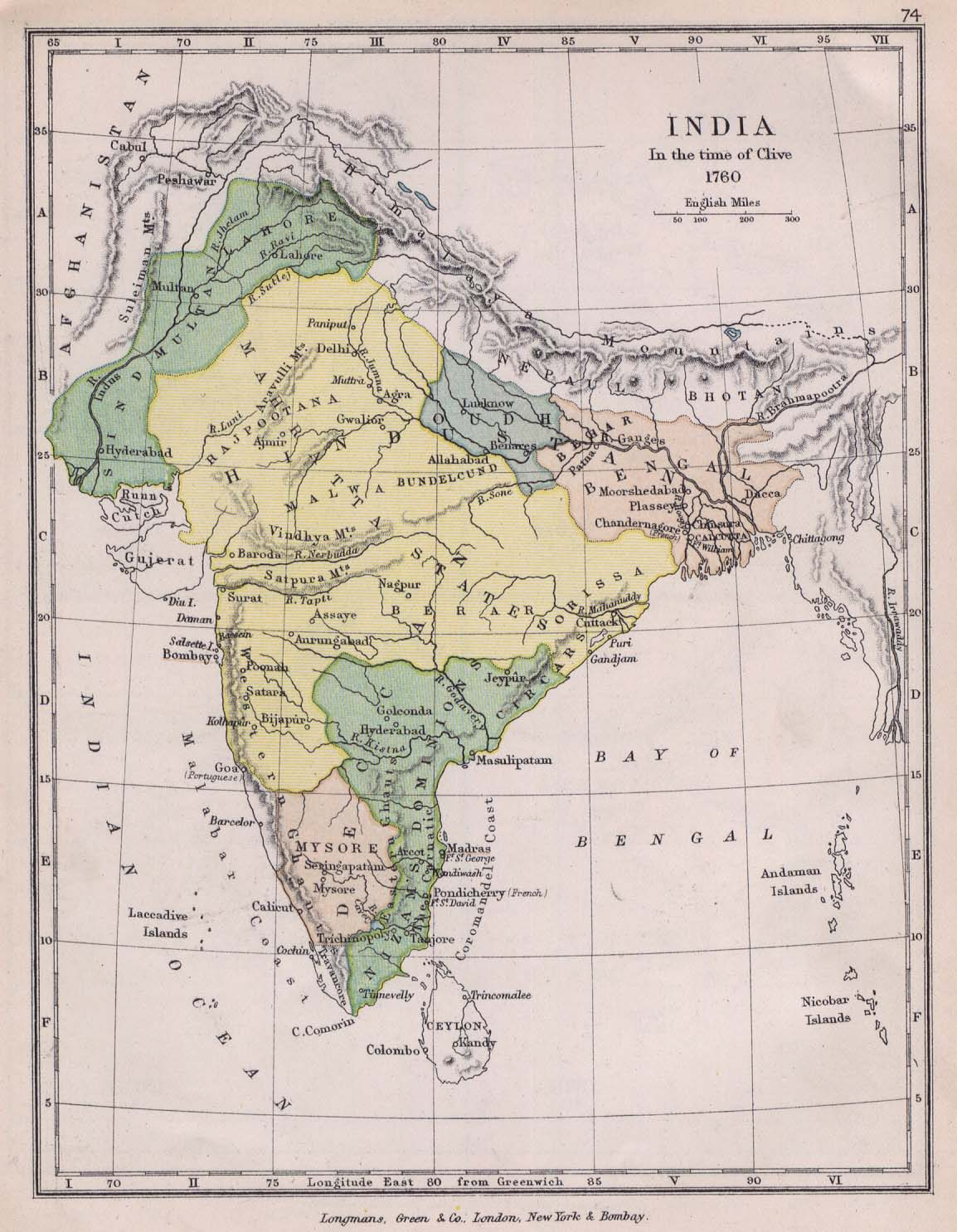
The Maratha Confederacy in 1760

In 1707, Emperor Aurangzeb died and Shahu was recognized by the Mughal Emperors as the rightful heirs to Shivaji. Over the 18th century Maratha Forces invaded and conquered former Mughal territories.

Shahu appointed Balaji Vishwanath as Peshwa in 1713. In 1719, Marathas under Balaji marched to Delhi with Sayyid Hussain Ali, the Mughal governor of Deccan, and deposed the Mughal emperor, Farrukhsiyar. The new teenaged emperor, Rafi ud-Darajat, who was also a puppet of the Sayyid brothers, granted Shahu rights to collecting Chauth and Sardeshmukhi from the six Mogul provinces of Deccan, and full possession of the territories controlled by Shivaji in 1680.

After Balaji Vishwanath's death in April 1720, his son, Bajirao I, was appointed Peshwa by Shahu. Bajirao is credited with expanding the Maratha Empire tenfold from 3% to 30% of the modern Indian landscape during 1720–1740. He fought over 41 battles before his death in April 1740 and is reputed to have never lost any.

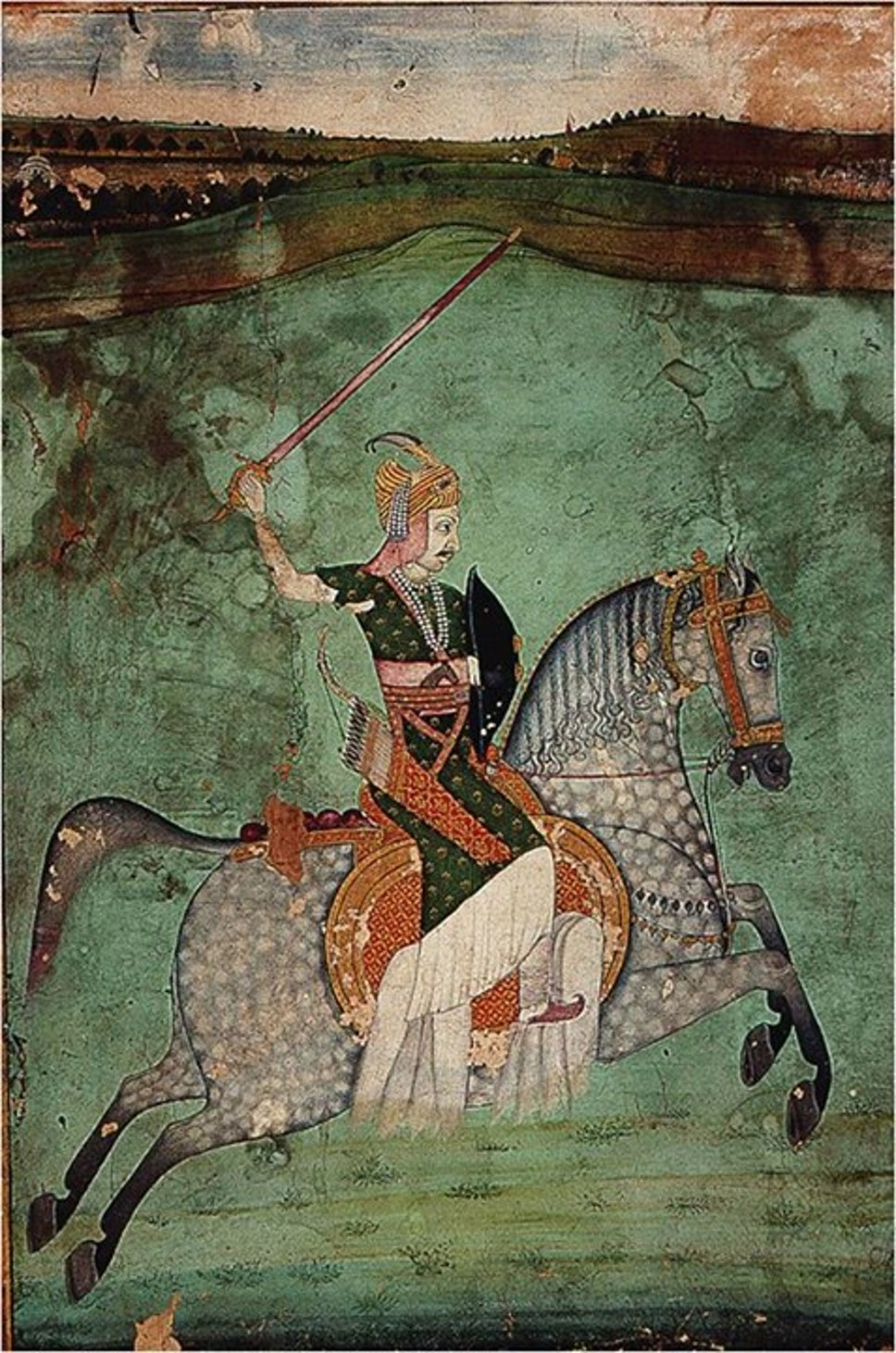
Bajirao I riding a horse into battle c.1720–1740

The Battle of Palkhed was a land battle that took place on 28 February 1728 at the village of Palkhed, near the city of Nashik, Maharashtra, India between Baji Rao I and Qamar-ud-din Khan, Asaf Jah I of Hyderabad. The Marathas defeated the Nizam. The battle is considered an example of the brilliant execution of military strategy. In 1737, Marathas under Bajirao I raided the suburbs of Delhi in a blitzkrieg in the Battle of Delhi (1737). The Nizam set out from the Deccan to rescue the Mughals from the invasion of the Marathas, but was defeated decisively in the Battle of Bhopal. The Marathas extracted a large tribute from the Mughals and signed a treaty which ceded Malwa to the Marathas.

Raghuji I of Nagpur undertook six expeditions into Bengal from 1741 to 1748. In 1743, the Nizam recaptured Tiruchirappalli from the Maratha forces in the Siege of Trichinopoly. Alivardi Khan, the Nawab of Bengal made peace with Raghuji in 1751 ceding Cuttack up to the river Subarnarekha, and agreeing to pay Rs. 1.2 million annually as the Chauth for Bengal and Bihar.

By 1760 Delhi had been sacked several times, and there was an acute shortage of supplies in the Maratha camp. Sadashivrao Bhau ordered the sacking of the already depopulated city. He is said to have planned to place his nephew and the Peshwa's son, Vishwasrao, on the Mughal throne. By 1760, with the defeat of the Nizam in the Deccan, Maratha power stretched across large parts of former Mughal territory. In 1761, Maratha power in Northern India declined following the Third Battle of Panipat.

In 1771, Mahadaji Shinde recaptured Delhi from the Rohilla Pashtuns. Shinde captured the family of Zabita Khan, desecrated the grave of Najib ad-Dawlah and looted his fort. With the fleeing of the Rohillas, the rest of the country was burnt, with the exception of the city of Amroha, which was defended by some thousands of Amrohi Sayyid tribes. Hafiz Rahmat Khan Barech sought assistance in an agreement formed with the Nawab of Oudh, Shuja-ud-Daula, by which the Rohillas agreed to pay four million rupees in return for military help against the Marathas. Hafiz Rehmat sought an alliance with Awadh to keep the Marathas out of Rohilkhand. However, after he refused to pay, Oudh attacked the Rohillas.

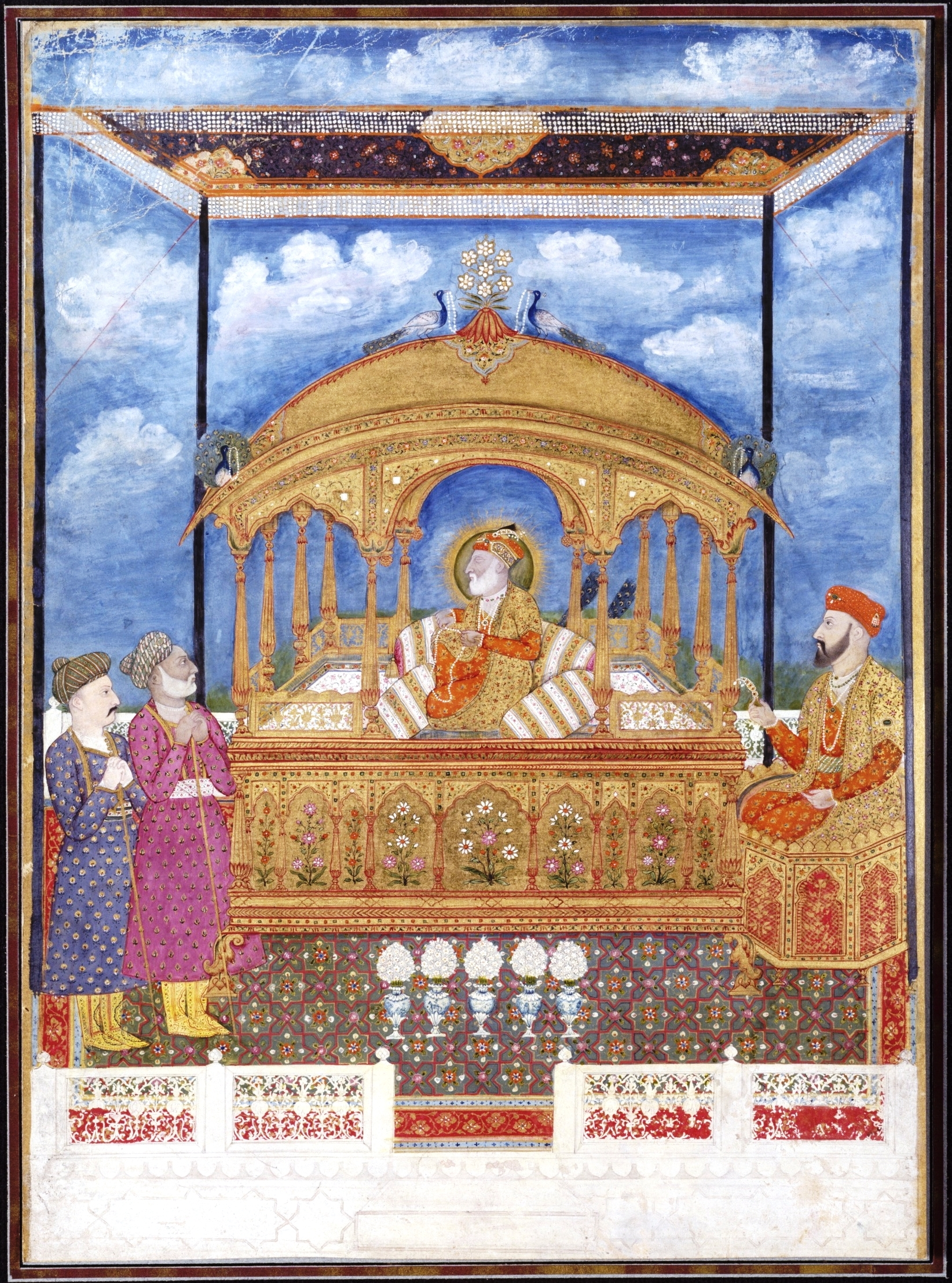
Shah Alam II was placed on the Mughal throne as a puppet ruler by the Marathas in 1784

In 1784, Shinde installed Shah Alam II as a puppet ruler on the Mughal throne. Shinde receiving in return the title of deputy Vakil-ul-Mutlak or vice-regent of the Empire. The Mughals also gave him the title of Amir-ul-Amara (head of the amirs). After taking control of Delhi, the Marathas sent a large army in 1772 to punish Afghan Rohillas for their involvement in Panipat. Their army devastated Rohilkhand by looting and plundering as well as taking members of the royal family as captives.

=== Later conflicts ===
The Marathas had lost control of Delhi in 1803 to the East India Company during the Second Anglo-Maratha War. In 1804, Mughal forces under Shah Alam II, allied with the East India Company, engaged with Maratha forces in Delhi. Yashwantrao Holkar confronted the British commander David Ochterlony. Holkar abandoned the siege after reinforcements led by Gerard Lake arrived on 18 October. With this victory, Shah Alam II retained control over Delhi under protection of the East India Company.

== Nader Shah's invasion of India ==
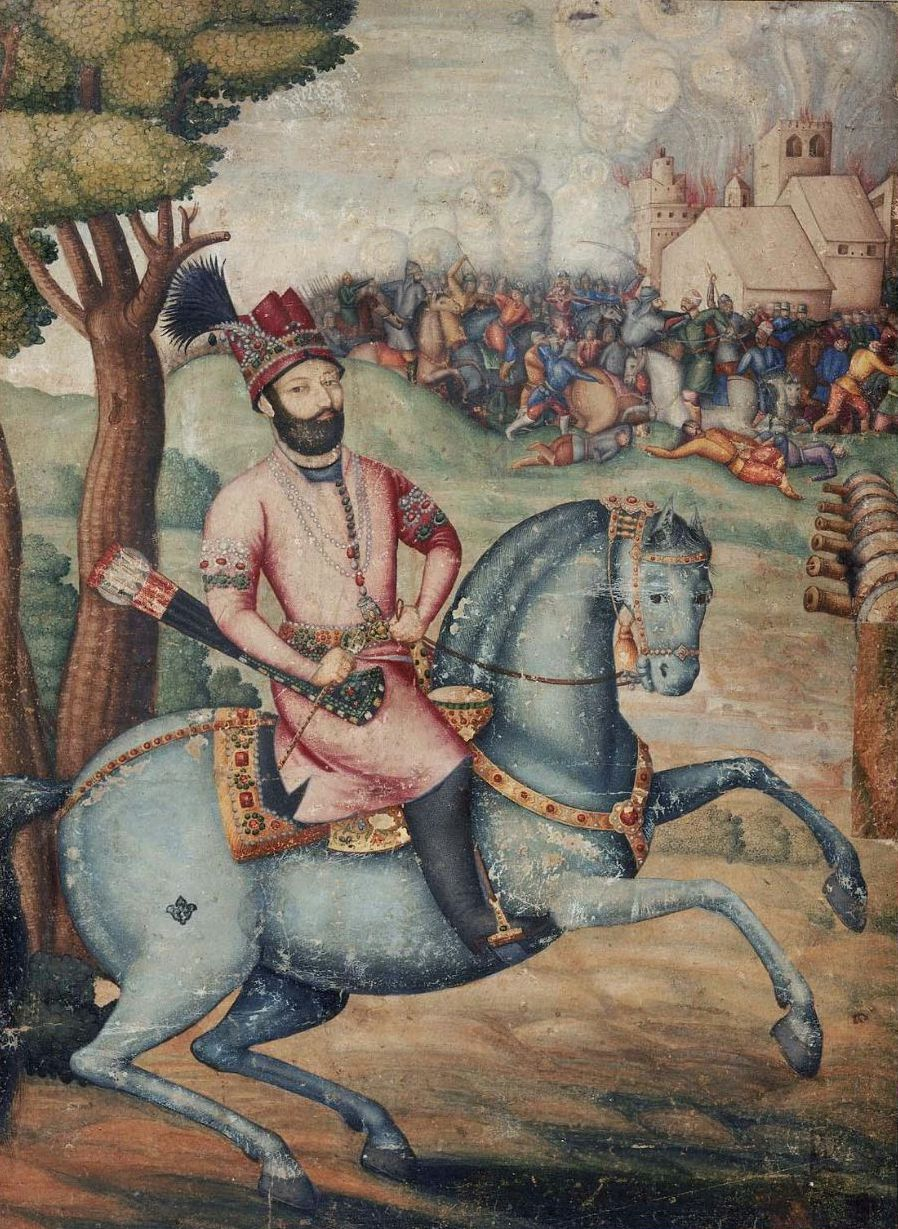
Nadar Shah's forces Sacking Delhi

Emperor Nader Shah, of the Afsharid dynasty, invaded large parts of Northern India including Delhi. His army had easily defeated the Mughals at the Battle of Karnal and would eventually capture the Mughal capital in the aftermath of the battle.

=== Battle of Khyber Pass ===
Mughal and Afsharid forces fought the Battle of Khyber Pass 1738. This was an overwhelming victory for the Persians, opening up the path ahead to invade the crown-lands of the Mughal Empire of Muhammad Shah. On November 26 from near Jalalabad, the Persian army arrived at Barikab (33 kilometres from the Khyber Pass) where Nader divided his army leaving his son Nasrollah Mirza behind with the bulk of the forces at his disposal and sending forth 12,000 men to the Khyber Pass under Nasrollah Qoli whilst he gathered a 10,000 light cavalry under his direct command. Beginning an epic flank-march of over 80 kilometres through some of the most unnavigable terrain in Asia, Nader reached close to Ali-Masjed where the 10,000 troops of his army curved their route of march northwards and onto the eastern end of the Khyber Pass.

As the reports reached the Mughal high command, disagreement arose as to whether these calls for reinforcement ought to be answered. Muhammad Shah was eager to join Sa'adat Khan in the field, but his two chief advisers, Nizam-ul-Mulk and Khan Dowran, advised caution against rash decisions. Khan-i Dauran declared that it was not the Indian style to abandon a friend, even if he was imprudent. The initial total of men leaving the Mughal camp alongside Khan Dowran was 8,000–9,000 men, mostly cavalry with some musket-bearing infantry. A steady stream of reinforcements left the Mughal encampment to cross the Alimardan river and join battle throughout the day, but there was no effort to bring these large numbers under a unified deployment east of the Alimardan river in support of Mughal units already engaged. Instead, the Mughals at the front would receive a continuous line of reinforcements with no grand tactical plan to help direct them.

=== Battle of Karnal ===
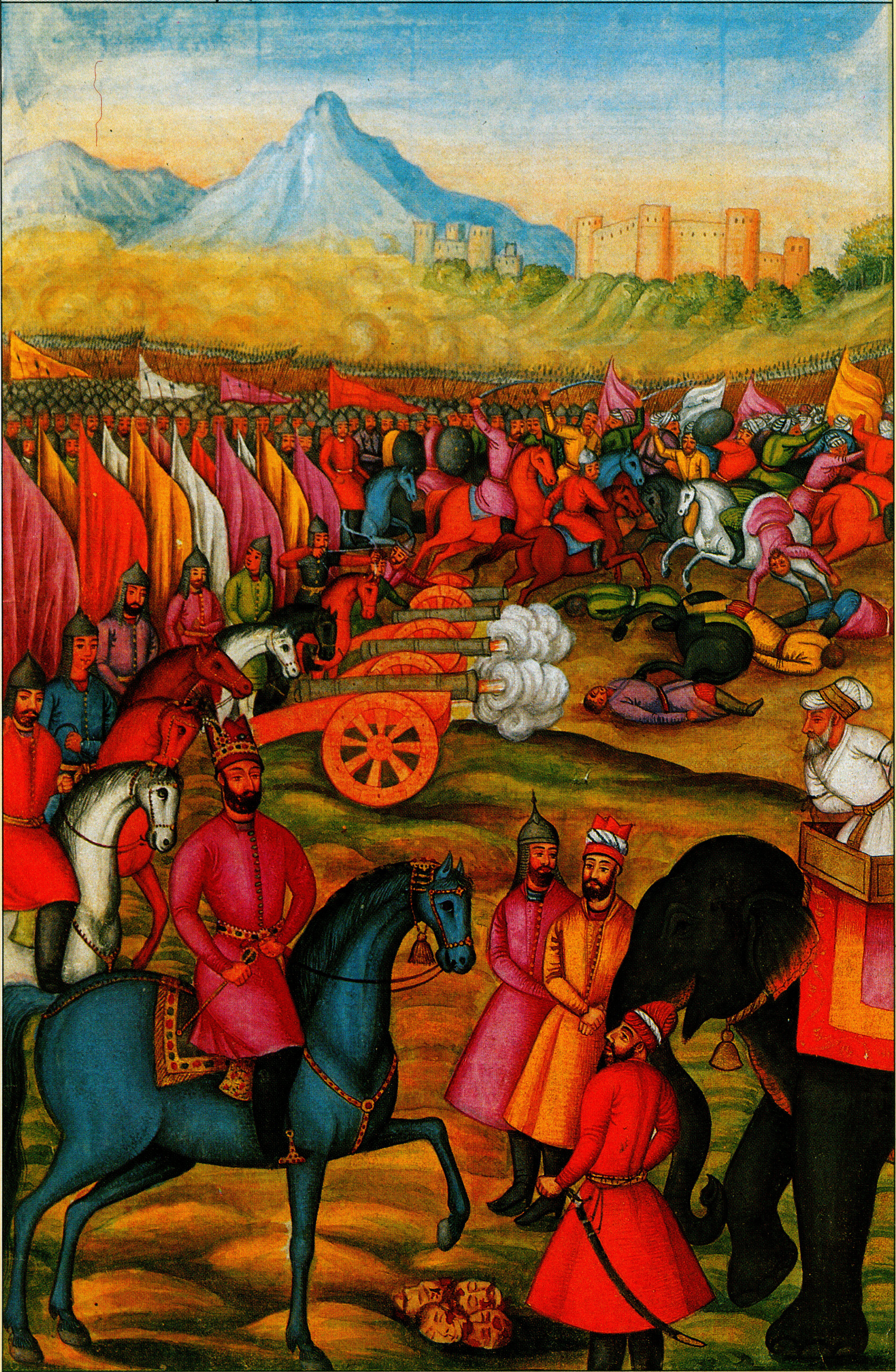
Illustration of Sa'adat Khan's surrender after the ambush at Kanjpura, as he is brought captive to Nader Shah upon his elephant.

On 24 February 1739 Mughal and Afsharid forces fought the Battle of Karnal Nader observed the massacre from behind the main line of jazāyers as they fired volley after volley into the reeling enemy before them. The cavalry of Khan Dowran, consisting of Indian Muslims, looked down on fighting with muskets with contempt, which was a talent of the mostly Hindu infantrymen in India. They prided themselves on sword-play and fancy-riding, while musketeers were not given importance in the Mughal military compared to Iran. The heavy bullets of the jazāyer muskets, and the even more powerful cannonballs of the zamburaks, easily penetrated the armour of the war elephants. Many nobles were killed and captured amongst the Mughals; Khan Dowran himself was struck. Badly injured, he fell from his elephant as his own blood splattered over him, prompting his remaining retainers to scramble to his aid.

Tahmasp Khan Jalayer, in command of the Persian right, did not engage until this phase in the battle and began wrapping his forces around the left flank of Sa'adat Khan's men from the north. After two hours of intense fighting in the centre, Sa'adat Khan's war elephant became entangled with another and in the frenzy a Persian soldier climbed the side of the Khan's beast and implored him to surrender. Being caught in an impossible set of circumstances Sa'adat Khan decided to lay down his arms. Unwilling to engage the Mughals on disadvantageous ground Nader re-established his lines in the valley to the east. Muhammad Shah urged the Nizam to help Khan Dowran, but the Nizam moved no further and ignored all pleas for action.

=== Sacking of Delhi ===
Nader entered Delhi with Mohammed Shah as his vassal on 20 March 1739. The person of the Shah was accompanied by 20,000 Savaran-e Saltanati (royal guard), and 100 war elephants mounted by his Jazāyerchi. Rumors began spreading amongst the populace of Delhi that a gratuitous levy was imminent. Nader sent out a fowj (a thousand-strong unit) but ordered them to engage only those involved in the violence. Nader sent forth 1,000 cavalrymen to each district of the city to ensure the collection of taxes. But perhaps the greatest riches were plundered from the treasuries of the Mughal dynasty's capital. The Peacock Throne was also taken away by the Persian army, and thereafter served as a symbol of Persian imperial might. Among a trove of other fabulous jewels, Nader also gained the Koh-i-Noor ("Mountain of Light") and Darya-ye Noor ("Sea of Light") diamonds. It is estimated that the total worth of the treasures plundered was perhaps 700 million rupees.

Persian troops left Delhi at the beginning of May 1739, also taking with them thousands of elephants, horses, and camels, all loaded with the booty they had collected. The plunder seized from India was so rich that Nader stopped taxation in Persia for a period of three years following his return. On Nader's return to Iran, Sikhs fell upon Nader's army and seized a large amount of booty and freed the slaves in captivity.

=== Losses and consequences ===
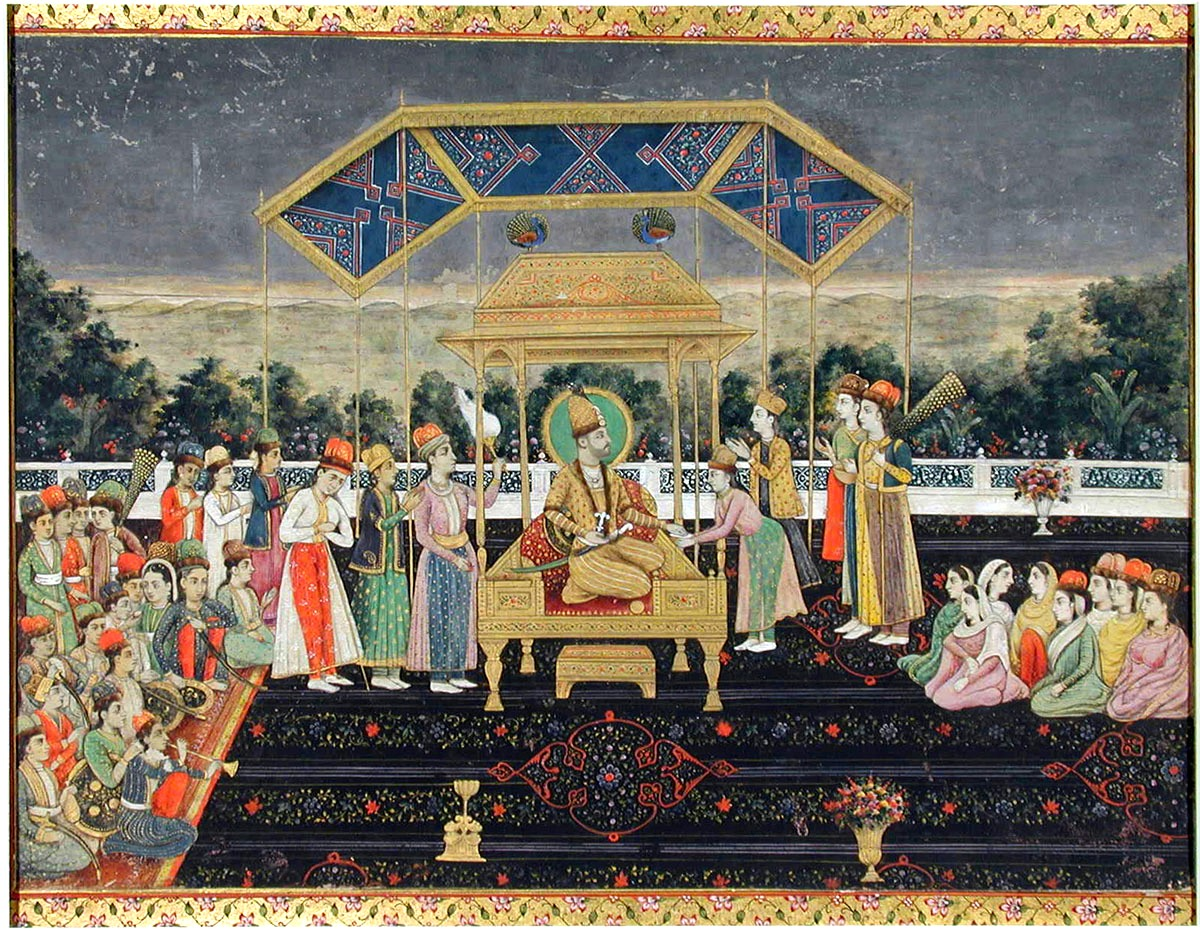
Nader Shah sitting upon the Peacock Throne after his victory at the Battle of Karnal.

The Mughals suffered far heavier casualties than the Persians. Exact figures are uncertain as accounts of that period were prone to bombast. Various contemporary commentators estimated Mughal casualties being up to 30,000 men slain with most agreeing on a figure of around 20,000 and with Axworthy giving an estimate of roughly 10,000 Mughal soldiers killed. Nader himself claimed that his army slew 20,000. The number of Mughal officers slain amounted to a staggering 400. The Mughals had been defeated in part due to their outdated cannons. In addition, Indian elephants were an easy target for Persian artillery and Persian troops were more skilled with a musket.

The city of Delhi was sacked for several days. A fine of 20 million rupees was levied on the people of Delhi. Muhammad Shah handed over the keys to the royal treasury, and lost the Peacock Throne, to Nader Shah, which thereafter served as a symbol of Persian imperial might. Amongst a treasure trove of other fabulous jewels, Nader also gained the Koh-i-Noor and Darya-i-Noor ("Mountain of Light" and "Sea of Light", respectively) diamonds; they are now part of the British and Iranian Crown Jewels, respectively. Nader and his Afsharid troops left Delhi in the beginning of May 1739, but before they left, he ceded back all territories to the east of the Indus, which he had overrun, to Muhammad Shah.

== European colonialism ==
In the 18th and 19th Centuries, the British and French East India Company fought several proxy wars with the Mughal Empire and its successor states. The British were overall victorious. This led to the weakening of the empire's power and economy.

=== Carnatic wars ===
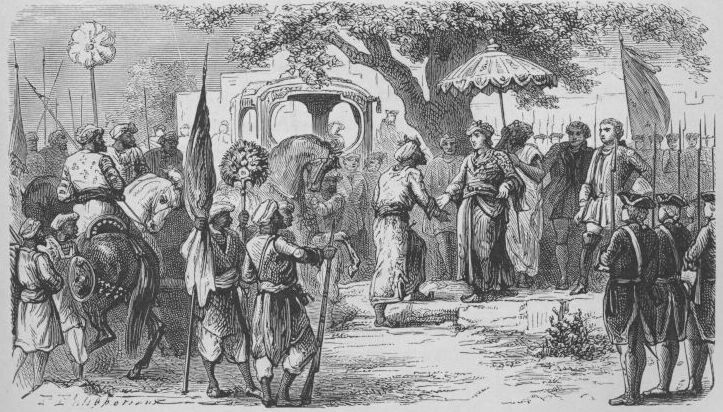
Joseph François Dupleix meeting the Nizam of Hyderabad Muzaffar Jung

The Mughal Emperor Aurangzeb died in 1707. He was succeeded by Bahadur Shah I, but there was a general decline in central control over the empire during the tenure of Jahandar Shah and later emperors. Nizam-ul-Mulk established Hyderabad as an independent kingdom. Several erstwhile Mughal territories were autonomous such as the Carnatic, ruled by Nawab Dost Ali Khan Dost Ali's death sparked a power struggle between his son-in-law Chanda Sahib, supported by the French, and Muhammad Ali, supported by the British.

In 1740, the First Carnatic War broke out as a part of the War of the Austrian Succession. Great Britain was drawn into the war in 1744, opposed to France and its allies. In July 1746, French commander La Bourdonnais and British Admiral Edward Peyton fought an indecisive action off Negapatam, after which the British fleet withdrew to Bengal. On 21 September 1746, the French captured the British outpost at Madras. La Bourdonnais had promised to return Madras to the British, but Joseph François Dupleix withdrew that promise, and wanted to give Madras to Anwar-ud-din after the capture. The Nawab, Anwaruddin Khan, then sent a 10,000-man army to take Madras from the French but this was repulsed in the Battle of Adyar. The French then made several attempts to capture the British Fort St. David at Cuddalore, but were halted. British Admiral Edward Boscawen besieged Pondicherry in the later months of 1748, but lifted the siege with the advent of the monsoon rains in October.

The siege was lifted in October 1748 with the arrival of the monsoon, and the war came to a conclusion with the arrival in December of news of the Peace of Aix-la-Chapelle. Under its terms Madras was returned to British control.

The Second Carnatic War broke out in 1749. On one side was Nasir Jung, the Nizam and his protege Muhammad Ali, supported by the British, and on the other was Chanda Sahib and Muzaffar Jung, supported by the French, vying to become the Nawab of Arcot. Muzaffar Jung and Chanda Sahib were able to capture Arcot while Nasir Jung's subsequent death allowed Muzaffar Jung to take control of Hyderabad. In 1751, however, Robert Clive led British troops to capture Arcot. The war ended with the Treaty of Pondicherry, signed in 1754, which recognised Muhammad Ali Khan Walajah as the Nawab of the Carnatic.

The outbreak of the Seven Years' War in Europe in 1756 resulted in renewed conflict between French and British forces in India. This started the Third Carnatic War in 1757. This war beyond southern India and into Bengal where British forces captured the French settlement of Chandernagore in 1757. However, the war was decided in the south, where the British successfully defended Madras, and Sir Eyre Coote decisively defeated the French, commanded by the Comte de Lally at the Battle of Wandiwash in 1760. After Wandiwash, Pondicherry fell to the British in 1761.

=== Battle of Plassey ===
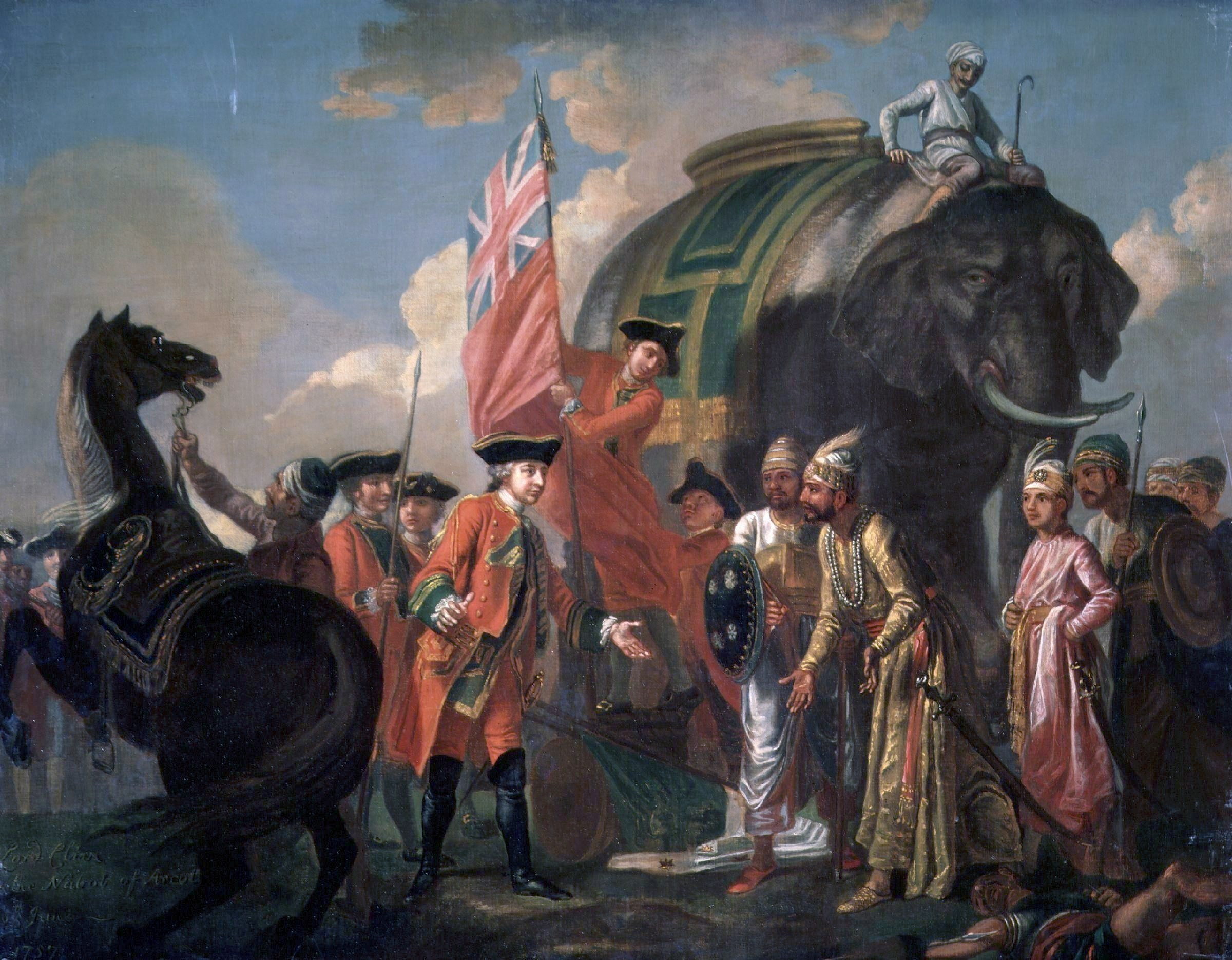
Robert Clive meeting with Mir Jafar after the Battle of Plassey.

The Battle of Plassey was fought by the British East India Company, under the leadership of Robert Clive and the Nawab of Bengal and his French allies in 1757. Clive defeated Siraj-ud-Daulah at Plassey in 1757 and captured Calcutta. Robert Clive bribed Mir Jafar, the commander-in-chief of the Nawab's army, and also promised to make him Nawab of Bengal. The victory was made possible by the defection of Mir Jafar, Nawab Siraj-ud-Daulah's commander in chief.

The battle was preceded by an attack on British-controlled Calcutta by Nawab Siraj-ud-Daulah and the Black Hole massacre. The British sent reinforcements under Colonel Robert Clive and Admiral Charles Watson from Madras to Bengal and recaptured Calcutta. Clive then seized the initiative to capture the French fort of Chandannagar.

Clive decided to launch a surprise attack on the Nawab's camp on the morning of 4 February 1757. The attack scared the Nawab into concluding the Treaty of Alinagar with the Company on 9 February, agreeing to restore the Company's factories, allow the fortification of Calcutta and restoring former privileges. The Nawab withdrew his army back to his capital, Murshidabad. Furthermore, Siraj-ud-Daula believed that the British East India Company did not receive any permission from the Mughal Emperor Alamgir II to fortify their positions in the territories of the Nawab of Bengal. On 23 June, Clive received a letter from Mir Jafar asking for a meeting with him. Clive was taken to the Nawab's palace, where he was received by Mir Jafar and his officers. Clive placed Mir Jafar on the throne and acknowledging his position as Nawab, presented him with a plate of gold rupees.

Siraj-ud-daulah had reached Murshidabad at midnight on 23 June. He summoned a council where some advised him to surrender to the British, some to continue the war and some to prolong his flight. His fate could not be decided by a council headed by Mir Jafar and was handed over to Mir Jafar's son, Miran, who had Siraj murdered that night. His remains were paraded on the streets of Murshidabad the next morning and were buried at the tomb of Alivardi Khan.

According to the treaty drawn between the British and Mir Jafar, the British acquired all the land within the Maratha Ditch and 600 yards (550 m) beyond it and the zamindari of all the land between Calcutta and the sea. Besides confirming the firman of 1717, the treaty also required the restitution of 22,000,000 rupees (£2,750,000) to the British for their losses. However, since the wealth of Siraj-ud-daulah proved to be far less than expected, one half of the amount was to be paid immediately – two-thirds in coin and one third in jewels and other valuables.

=== Battle of Buxar ===
Map of the Indian Subcontinent in 1765

The Battle of Buxar was fought between the British East India Company, under Hector Munro, and the combined armies of Balwant Singh, Mir Qasim, Shuja-ud-Daula, Shah Alam II. it was a challenging victory for the British East India Company. The war was brought to an end by the Treaty of Allahabad in 1765. The defeated Indian rulers were forced to sign this treaty, granting the East India Company diwani rights, which allowed them to collect revenue from the territories of Bengal, Bihar, and Orissa on behalf of the Mughal emperor. This gave the company immense economic control, enabling them to pass financial policies to exploit the resources of the region for their own benefit.

The British engaged in the fighting numbered 17,072 Munro divided his army into various columns and particularly pursued the Mughal Grand Vizier Shuja-ud-Daula the Nawab of Awadh who responded by blowing up his boat-bridge after crossing the river, thus abandoning the Mughal Emperor Shah Alam II and members of his own regiment. Mir Qasim also fled with his 3 million rupees worth of gemstones and later died in poverty in 1777. Mirza Najaf Khan reorganized formations around Shah Alam II, who retreated and then chose to negotiate with the victorious British.

Following their victory, the British East India Company emerged as the predominant power in Bengal over the already declining Mughal Empire. In 1765, the British East India Company was granted the right to collect taxes from Bengal-Bihar. Eventually, in 1772, the East India Company abolished local rule and took complete control of the province of Bengal-Bihar. The battle exposed the inherent weaknesses and divisions among the Indian rulers. The lack of unity and coordination between the Nawabs and the Mughal Emperor made it easier for the British to overpower them. This further exacerbated the fragmentation of political power in India and paved the way for British imperialism.

==== Treaty of Allahabad ====
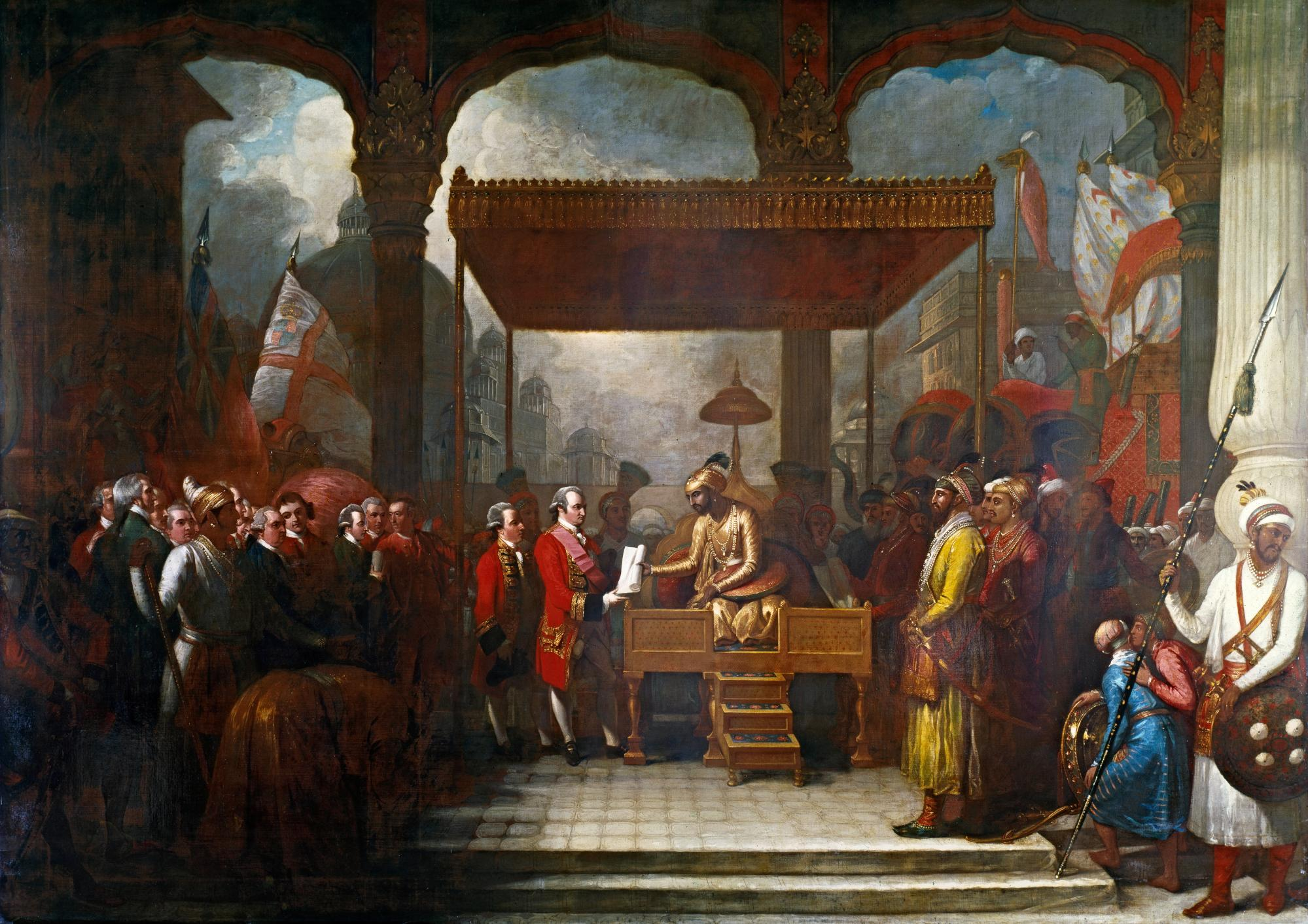
The Mughal emperor Shah Alam II and Robert Clive sign the Treaty of Allahabad.

The Treaty of Allahabad was signed on 16 August 1765, between the Mughal Emperor Shah Alam II and Robert Clive, after the Battle of Buxar.The treaty was handwritten by I'tisam-ud-Din, a Bengali Muslim scribe and diplomat to the Mughal Empire.

The treaty marked the political and constitutional involvement of the British in India. Based on the terms of the agreement, Alam granted the East India Company Diwani rights, or the right to collect taxes on behalf of the Emperor from the eastern province of Bengal-Bihar-Orissa. These rights allowed the company to collect revenue directly from the Bengal Subah. In return, the Company paid an annual tribute of twenty-six lakh rupees while securing for Shah Alam II the districts of Kora and Allahabad. The tribute money paid to the emperor was for the maintenance of the Emperor's court in Allahabad. The Nawab of Awadh Shuja ud Daulah also had to pay fifty lakhs of rupees as war indemnity to the East India Company.

== Conflicts with the Afghans ==
=== Early revolts ===
After the Mughal conquest of Pashtun homelands, several revolts by local Pashtun tribes started to arise, specifically in the Kabul Sabah.

During the reign of Akbar, revolts brow out in the Malandari Pass under Yousafzai leader Kalu Khan. The siege took more than two months. The Akbar than sent one of his most intelligent and closest Minister whose name was Raja Birbal. But the Yousufzai tribesmen defeated the Mughal forces led by Birbal, who was killed in action. Khafi Khan, 40,000–50,000 Mughal men perished in this battle. However, Badayuni claims a death toll of 8,000.

=== Conflict with the Durrani Empire ===
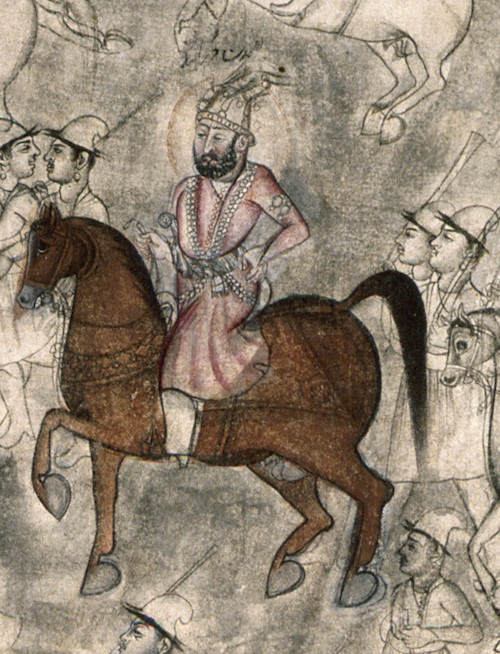
Ahmad Shah Durrani on horseback

Ahmad Shah Durrani, the founder of the Durrani Empire, invaded Indian subcontinent, engaging in conflict with the Mughal Empire in the 18th century. These invasions contributed to the decline of the Mughal Empire. Various civil wars and revolts in Lahore enabled Durrani to evade the city.

==== Battle of Lahore (1748) ====
On 10 January 1748, Ahmad Shah Durrani and his army camped near the Shalamar gardens. The Afghan and Mughal Forces would fight one another on 11 January 1748. Durrani had around 18,000 Afghan soldiers under his command, one third of which were from his own tribe. Durrani's army however lacked any artillery and was much smaller compared to the Mughals. Shah Nawaz had around 70,000 Soldiers under his command along with artillery.

Ahmad Shah was able to overpower the Qizilbash soldiers of the Mughal army and began pursuing them into their entrenchments. Asmatullah Khan began calling in for reinforcements. Adina Beg failed in properly reinforcing Asmatullah and Adina Beg soon fled towards Lahore. Some of the Mughal soldiers took this as a sign of a ceasefire, and retreated to their trenches in complete disorder. The Afghans now launched a full-scale attack on the Mughal forces which forced Asmatullah Khan to retreat. The various guns and artillery that was stored in the fort of Hazrat Ishan fell in the hands of the Afghan forces. Adina Beg fired cannons and rockets onto the Afghan forces, however the Afghans were able to overpower the resistance offered by the Mughals. Shah Nawaz escaped Lahore and fled towards Delhi. Asmatullah Khan was killed during the battle.

Ahmad Shah Durrani and the Afghan forces entered Lahore on 12 January 1748. The previous members of the Lahore government that had been imprisoned by Shah Nawaz were released by the Afghans. Mir Momin Khan, Lakhpath Rai and Surat Singh pleaded to Durrani to spare the city from plunder and paid a ransom to the Afghans. Ahmad Shah accepted the ransom and ordered his officers to make sure the Afghan soldiers wouldn't subject the city to plunder. Despite this, some parts of the city were looted by the Afghan forces. Various Guns, artillery, treasure and other goods all fell in the hands of the Afghan forces following their conquest of Lahore. Durrani stayed in the city of Lahore for 5 weeks and began his plans to advance towards Delhi.

==== Battle of Manupur ====
Durrani attacked India in 1748. He had faced Mughal, Rajput and Sikh coalitions in Sirhind, Ahmad Shah's Afghan troops swept aside the Mughal army's left flank and raided their baggage train but a fire beginning in a captured rocket cart went on to ignite the Durrani artillery store, roasting thousands of soldiers alive and forcing Ahmad Shah Durrani's retreat. After the retreat of Durrani, Sikh bands under Charat Singh continued to harass them as they retreated to Kabul. He lost to the combined Mughal, Rajput and Sikhs forces.

==== Battle of Lahore (1752) ====
In the winter of 1751, he invaded India for the third time on the pretext that Mir Mannu, the Mughal governor of the province of Lahore, had refused to pay him tax which he had promised to give on a monthly basis. Durrani started the battle by successfully besieging Mannu in the Lahore Fort. Mannu wrote to the Mughal emperor Ahmad Shah Bahadur for help, he received no reinforcements from Delhi. Failing to put up a fight, he surrendered to Durrani on 6 March 1752. After signing the instrument of surrender, Durrani's forces looted and plundered the city.

Mannu signed a peace treaty under which the two territories of Punjab – Multan and Lahore - were to be ceded to Durrani's Afghan empire. At that time, the wazir of Delhi, Safdar Jang, was in Awadh to suppress a rebellion. He returned at the end of the month with fresh recruits to confront Durrani, but learned of the treaty and retreated.

== Sikh rebellions ==
=== Akal Sena ===
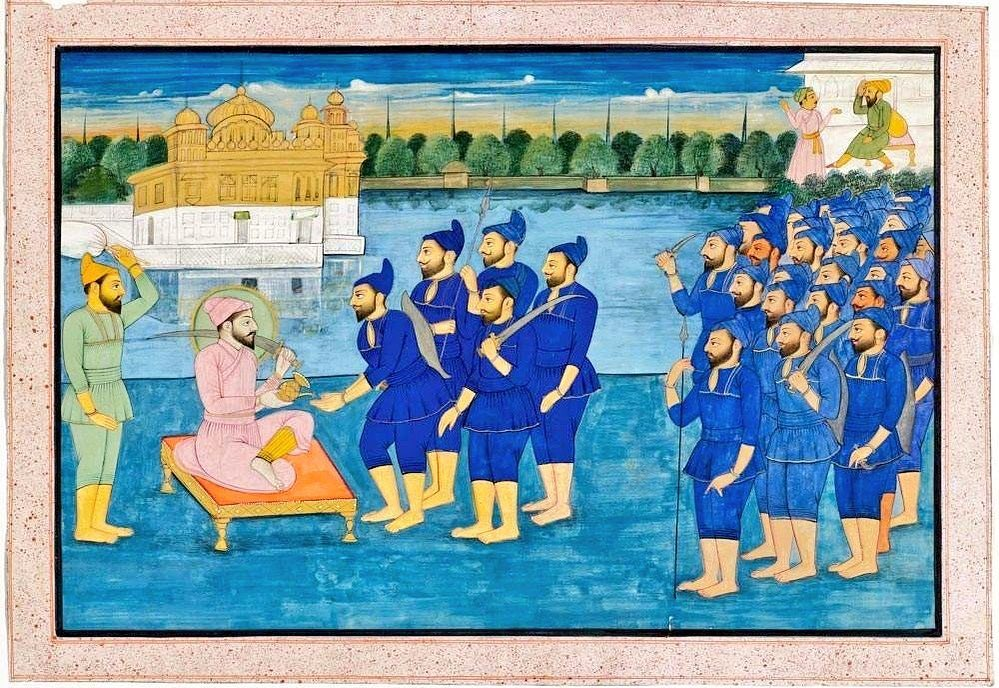
Painting of Guru Hargobind and his army, the Akal Sena, at the Golden Temple complex in Amritsar, circa 19th century

The Akal Sena, a Sikh military force, was founded by Guru Hargobind. consisting of 700-800 horses, 300-500 cavalrymen, 60 musketeers, and 60 artillery men. The Akal Sena fought major battles against the Mughal empire and its allies, winning all four of the major battles in-which Guru Hargobind was leader, as well as more minor skirmishes. Guru Tegh Bahadur was executed by beheading in 1675 on the orders of Aurangzeb. The Akal Sena was absorbed into the Khalsa Fauj of the Khalsa order formalized by Guru Gobind Singh in Anandpur on 13 April 1699,.

=== Early wars ===
The going power of the Sikh armies resulted in several conflicts fought between the Sikhs and Mughal Empire throughout the 17th century. The battle of Rohilla, was fought in 1621 and was a Sikh victory. The Battle of Amritsar was fought during Mukhlis Khan's campaign against Guru Hargobind and the Sikhs on 14 April 1634. The Battle of Kartarpur was fought on 25 April 1635.

=== Khalsa Fauj ===
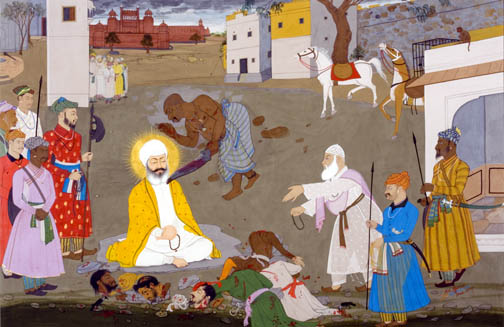
Painting depicting the execution of Guru Tegh Bahadur in 1675

The Khalsa Fauj was established inn 1699 by Guru Gobind Singh replacing the Akal Sena after the execution of his father Guru Tegh Bahadur by Emperor Aurangzeb in 1675. The Khalsa Fauj frequently fought battles with the Mughal Empire and Rajas belonging to various Hill States. A short-lived reconciliation between the Mughals and Sikhs occurred in 1707. Gobind Singh sent Banda Singh Bahadur to the northwest. After the death of Banda Singh Bahadur, the Khalsa Fauj divided into various jathas (armed group or band of Sikhs). By the 1720s, the rebellion of the Sikhs had been extinguished.

=== First Sikh State ===
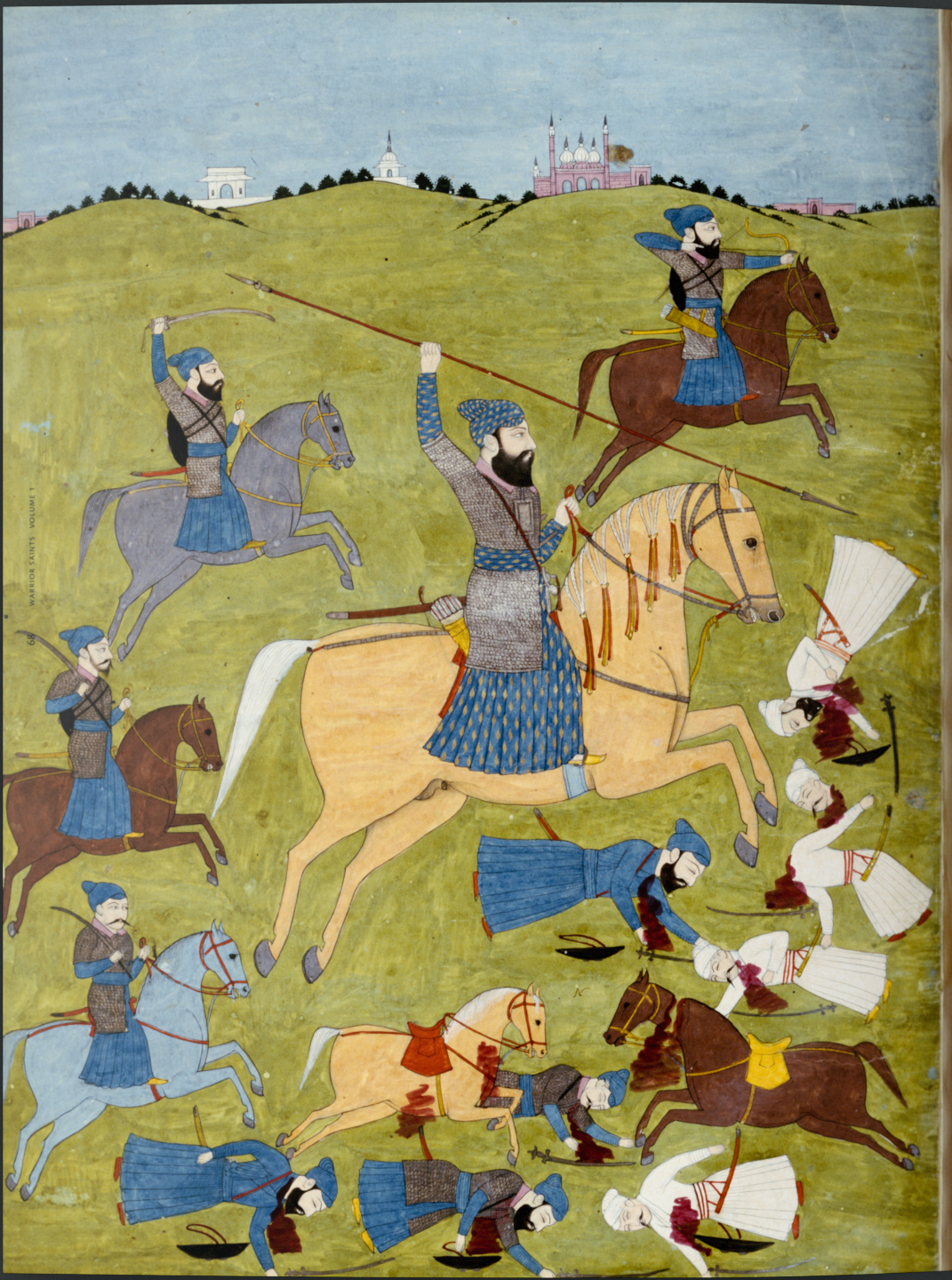
Painting from an illustrated folio of a Mughal manuscript depicting the Battle of Sirhind (1710)

The First Sikh State was established by Banda Singh Bahadur after the Battle of Samana and lasted until his defeat in the Battle of Gurdas Nangal. In 1709, the Battle of Amritsar was fought in which the Sikhs were victorious. On 14 May 1710, Banda and his army entered and captured Sirhind. In 1710, Wazir Khan was later killed in the Battle of Chappar Chiri. The Battle of Rahon was fought between Sikhs and Mughal Empire on 11 October 1710. The Siege of Gurdaspur took place in April 1715 leading to the fall of the first Sikh state.

=== Dal Khalsa ===
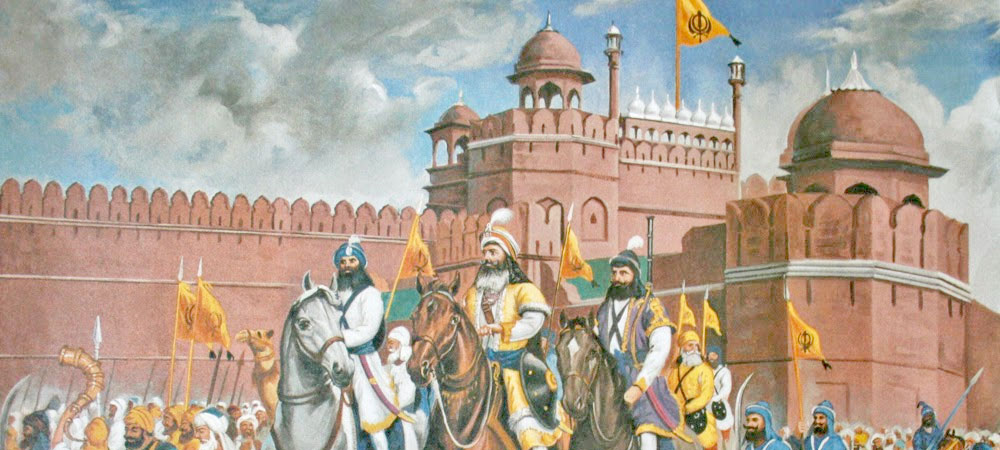
Sikh Forces occupy the Red fort in Delhi during the Battle of Delhi in 1783

Dal Khalsa was the combined military forces of 11 Sikh misls established by Nawab Kapur Singh in 1748.

In 1733, the subahdar of Lahore Zakariya Khan Bahadur attempted to negotiate a peace with the Sikhs by offering them a jagir, the title Nawab to their leader, and unimpeded access to the Harmandir Sahib. The Sikh leader Kapur Singh was titled Nawab.

The Battle of Delhi was fought between the Dal Khalsa and the Mughal forces in 1783. The Sikhs under Baghel Singh, Jassa Singh Ramgarhia, and Jassa Singh Ahluwalia began raiding and plundering the outskirts of Delhi in 1764. In April 1782, Najaf Khan hitherto the highest commander of the Mughal army died. In 1783, Sikh forced would temporally occupy the city of Delhi. Ahluwalia was temporally placed the Mughal throne, however Ramgarhia objected it without the approval of Sarbat Khalsa. Ramgarhia later captured the Red Fort of Delhi and detached the Mughal throne and brought it on elephants to Amritsar. The Nawab of Sardhana Begum Samru requested the Sikhs to leave Delhi allowing 30,000 of Sikh troops to stay and 5 Gurdwaras constructed. The Mughal Emperor Shah Alam II and the Sikh leaders agreed. However the Sikhs refused to accept athorory of the Mughal Crown. Later,Vicegerent Mahadji Shinde was made an agreement with the Sikhs not to raid the Mughal lands in exchange for 1/3 of the Delhi's revenue annually.

== Indian rebellion and formal end ==
On 10 May 1857 a rebellion against the British East India Company broke out in the Indian Subcontinent.

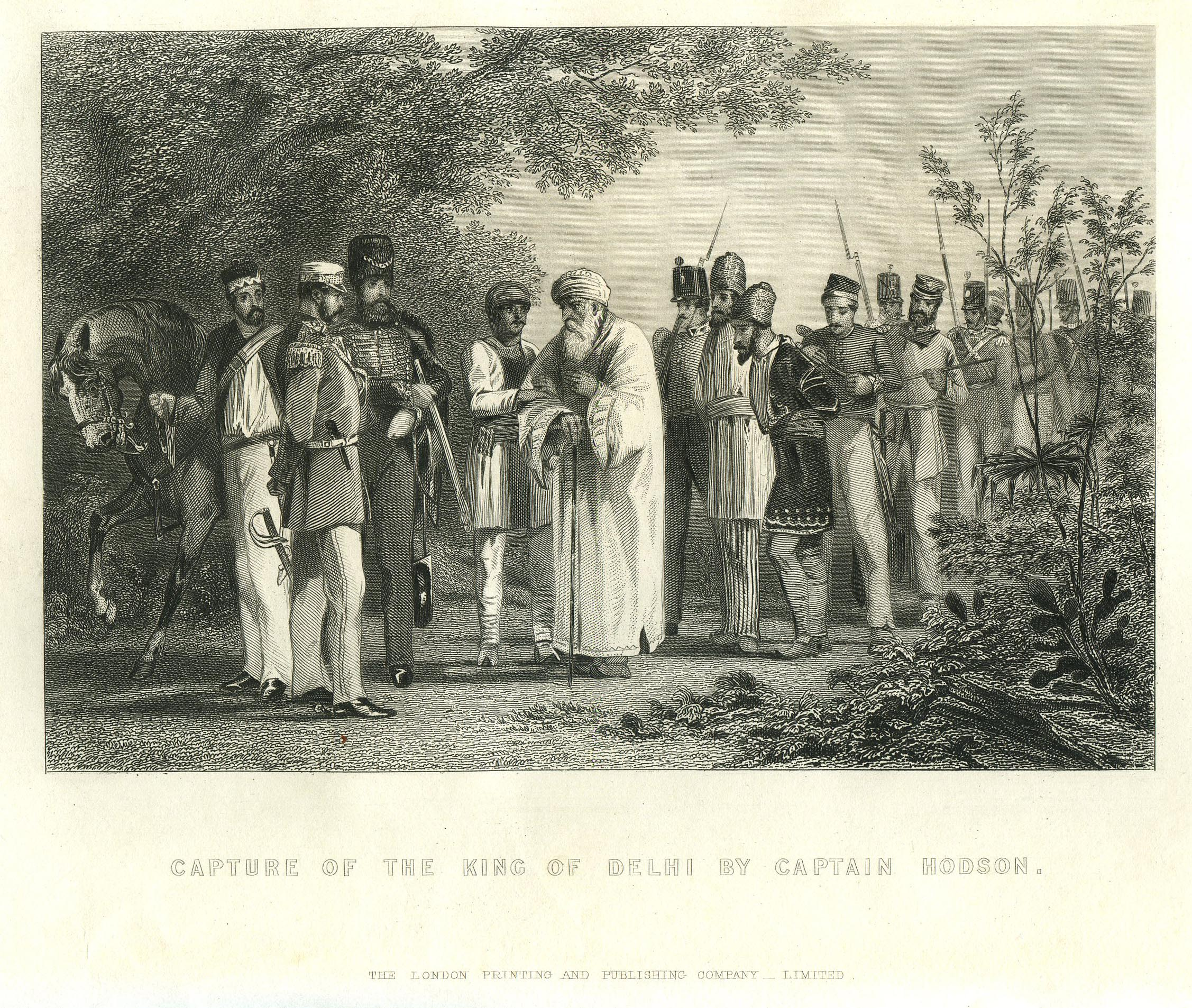
The capture of Bahadur Shah Zafar in 1857

On 12 May 1857, Zafar held his first formal audience in several years. Bahadur Shah Zafar's conduct was indecisive. However, he yielded to the demands of the sepoys when he was told that they would not be able to win against the East India Company without him. On 16 May, sepoys and palace servants killed fifty-two Europeans who were prisoners of the palace and who were discovered hiding in the city. The executions took place under a peepul tree in front of the palace, despite Zafar's protests. It was later believed that Bahadur Shah was not directly responsible for the massacre, but that he may have been able to prevent it, and he was therefore considered a consenting party during his trial.

The Emperor nominated his eldest son, Mirza Mughal, as the commander in chief of his forces. However, Mirza Mughal had little military experience and was rejected by the sepoys.

During the Siege of Delhi when the victory of the British became certain, Zafar took refuge at Humayun's Tomb, in an area that was then at the outskirts of Delhi. Company forces led by Major William Hodson surrounded the tomb and Zafar was captured on 20 September 1857. The next day, Hodson shot his sons Mirza Mughal and Mirza Khizr Sultan, and grandson Mirza Abu Bakht under his own authority at the Khooni Darwaza, near the Delhi Gate and declared Delhi to be captured.

After a crushing defeat in the war of 1857–1858 which he nominally led, the last Mughal, Bahadur Shah Zafar, was deposed by the British East India Company and exiled in 1858. Zafar was exiled to Rangoon, Burma. His wife Zeenat Mahal and some of the remaining members of the family accompanied him. At 4 am on 7 October 1858, Zafar along with his wives, and two remaining sons began his journey towards Rangoon in bullock carts escorted by 9th Lancers under the command of Lieutenant Ommaney. Through the Government of India Act 1858 the British Crown assumed direct control of East India Company-held territories in India in the form of the new British Raj. In 1876 the British Queen Victoria assumed the title of Empress of India.

== See also ==
- Battle of Fatehpur Sikri
- Sikh attacks on Delhi
- Maratha capture of Mughals
- Maratha conquest of North-west India
- Takht ya takhta
