= First Carnatic War =

1746–1748 war in India

- Part of the War of the Austrian Succession and the Carnatic Wars
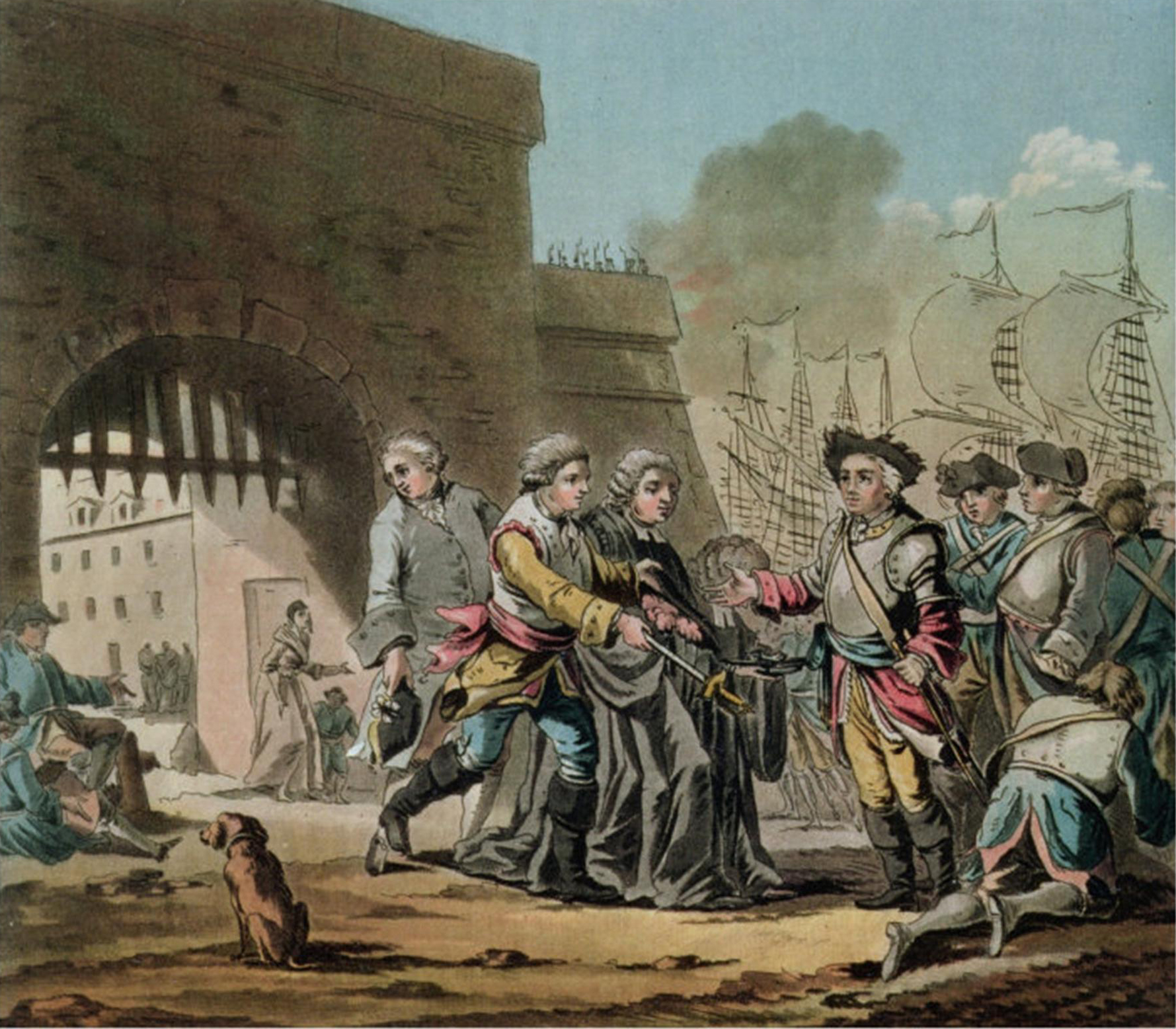
- The British surrender of Madras, 1746
Date	1744 or 1746 –1748
Location	Carnatic region, South India
Result	Status quo ante bellum

Belligerents
Mughal Empire; Nizam of Hyderabad: Nawab of Carnatic	Kingdom of France: (Kingdom of France) French East India Company	Kingdom of Great Britain: British East India Company

Commanders and leaders
Anwaruddin Khan; Muhammad Ali Khan Wallajah	Joseph François Dupleix; Bertrand-François Mahé de La Bourdonnais	Stringer Lawrence; Edward Peyton; Edward Boscawen

The First Carnatic War (1744/1746–1748) was the Indian theatre of the War of the Austrian Succession and the first of a series of Carnatic Wars that established early British dominance on the east coast of the Indian subcontinent. In this conflict the British and French East India Companies vied with each other on land for control of their respective trading posts at Madras, Pondicherry, and Cuddalore, while naval forces of France and Britain engaged each other off the coast. The war set the stage for the rapid growth of French hegemony in southern India under the command of French Governor-General Joseph François Dupleix in the Second Carnatic War.

== Course of the war ==
In 1720 France effectively nationalised the French East India Company, and began using it to expand its imperial interests. This became a source of conflict with the British in India with the entry of Britain into the War of the Austrian Succession in 1744. Hostilities in India began with a British naval attack on a French fleet in 1745, which led the French Governor-General Dupleix to request additional forces. A fleet under La Bourdonnais arrived in 1746 to help him. In July of that year La Bourdonnais and British Admiral Edward Peyton fought an indecisive action off Negapatam, after which La Bourdonnais put in at Pondicherry for repairs and strategising with Dupleix. The fleets met again on 19 August, but Peyton refused battle, recognising that La Bourdonnais had acquired additional guns at Pondicherry, and retreated to Bengal. On 4 September 1746, La Bourdonnais led an attack on Madras. After several days of bombardment the British surrendered and the French entered the city. The British leadership was taken prisoner and sent to Pondicherry. It was originally agreed that the town would be restored to the British after negotiation but this was opposed by Dupleix, who sought to annex Madras to French holdings. The remaining British residents were asked to take an oath promising not to take up arms against the French; a handful refused, among them a young Robert Clive, and were kept under weak guard as the French prepared to destroy the fort. Disguising themselves as natives, Clive and three others eluded their inattentive sentry, slipped out of the fort, and made their way to Fort St. David (the British post at Cuddalore), some 110 miles (180 km) to the south. Dupleix, in the meantime, had before the assault promised to turn over Fort St. George to the Nawab of the Carnatic Anwaruddin Khan, but refused to do so.

Anwaruddin responded by sending a 10,000-man army to take the fort from Dupleix by force. Dupleix, who had lost the support of La Bourdonnais over the status of Madras, had only 930 French troops. However, in the Battle of Adyar, this small force successfully repulsed the attacks of Anwaruddin's army.

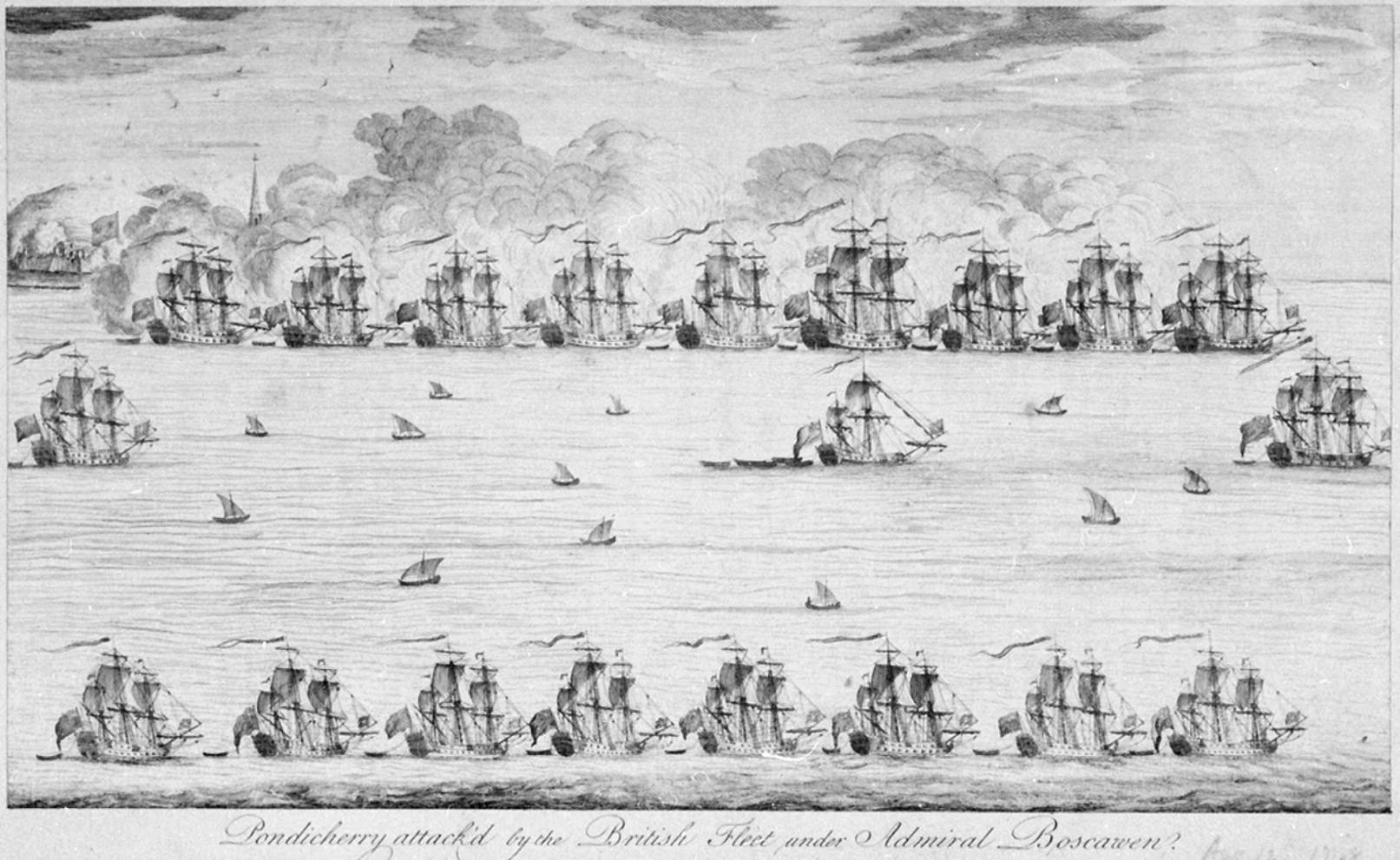
British Admiral Edward Boscawen besieged Pondicherry in late 1748

Dupleix then launched an assault on Fort St. David. Stung by his defeat at Adyar, Anwaruddin sent his son Muhammad Ali to assist the British in the defence of Cuddalore, and was instrumental in holding off a French attack in December 1746. Over the next few months Anwaruddin and Dupleix had made peace, and the Carnatic troops were withdrawn.

The French, under the command of De Brurie, launched another attempt to take Fort St. David, forcing the British defenders inside the fort's walls. The timely counterattack by the British and the Nawab, however, turned the tables and prompted the French to withdraw to Pondicherry.

In 1748 Major Stringer Lawrence arrived to take command of the British troops at Fort St. David. With the arrival of reinforcements from Europe, the British besieged Pondicherry in late 1748. Clive distinguished himself in successfully defending a trench against a French sortie: one witness of the action wrote "[Clive's] platoon, animated by his exhortation, fired again with new courage and great vivacity upon the enemy." The siege was lifted in October 1748 with the arrival of the monsoon, and the war came to a conclusion with the arrival in December of news of the Peace of Aix-la-Chapelle. Under its terms Madras was returned to British control.

== Consequences ==
The power of a small number of heavily-trained French and French trained Indian troops over larger Indian formations using older military tactics was not lost on Joseph Dupleix, and over the next several years he capitalised on this advantage to greatly expand French influence in south India. In the Second Carnatic War (1748–1754) he took advantage of struggles for succession to the Nizam of Hyderabad and Nawab of the Carnatic to establish strong French influence over a number of states in south India. The British East India Company, in contrast, did little to expand its own influence and only weakly attempted to oppose Dupleix's expansive activities. Robert Clive recognised that this threatened the entire livelihood of the Company in the area, and in 1751 engaged in a series of celebrated military exploits that cemented British control over Madras by the end of that conflict. There were no territorial gains for either the British or the French and the former territories were restored to these two parties. The war had also enhanced the prestige of the French in the Carnatic Region.

== Naval Forces ==
=== French Royal Navy ===
The French naval squadron in the East Indies during the war included:

- Commander, Bertrand-François Mahé, Comte de La Bourdonnais
- Original Squadron
  - Achille (74 guns, only 70 guns on-ship)
  - Duc d'Orléans (56 guns, only 36 guns on-ship)
  - Bourbon (56 guns, only 34 guns on-ship)
  - Neptune (54 guns, only 34 guns on-ship)
  - Phoenix (54 guns, only 34 guns on-ship)
  - Sainte-Louis (44 guns, only 30 guns on-ship)
  - Lys (40 guns, only 28 guns on-ship)
  - Insulaire (30 guns, only 26 guns on-ship)
- Joining in September
  - Centaure (74 guns)
  - Mars (56 guns)
  - Brillant (50 guns)

=== British Royal Navy ===
The British naval squadron in the East Indies during the war included:

- Commander, Rear-admiral of the Red Thomas Griffin
- HMS Princess Mary (60 guns)
- HMS Medway (60 guns)
- HMS Exeter (60 guns)
- HMS York (60 guns)
- HMS Winchester (50 guns)
- HMS Harwich (50 guns)
- HMS Preston (50 guns)
- HMS Eltham (40 guns)
- HMS Pearl (40 guns)
- HMS Medway's Prize (40 guns)
- HMS Lively (20 guns)
