= Battle of Madras =

Battle of the War of the Austrian Succession

- Part of First Carnatic War
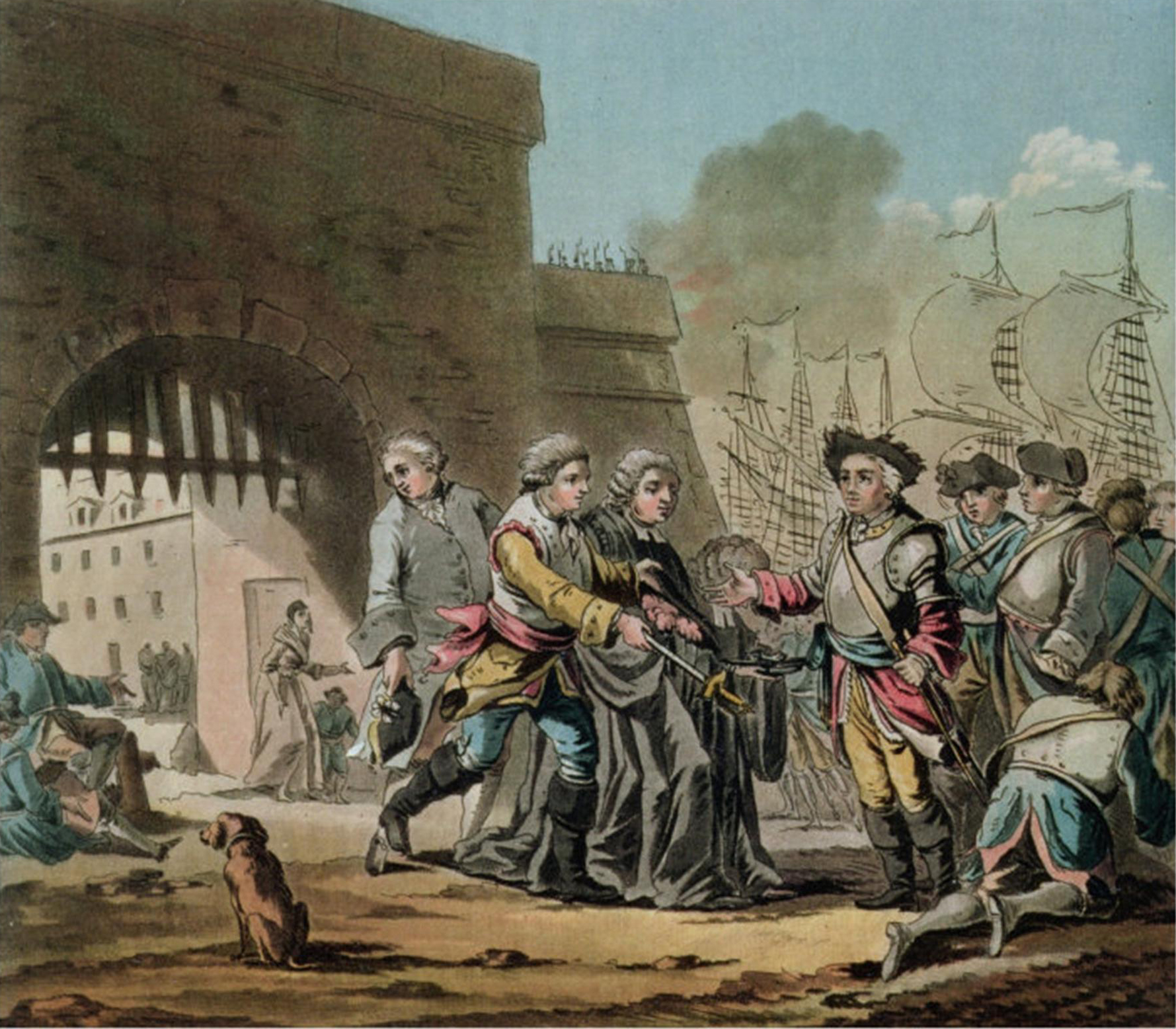
- Surrender of The City of Madras 1746, by Jacques François Joseph Swebach-Desfontaines
Date	7–9 September 1746
Location	Madras, Madras Presidency, India
Result	French victory

Belligerents
Great Britain: East India Company	France: French India

Commanders and leaders
(Kingdom of Great Britain) Nicholas Morse	(Kingdom of France) Bertrand-François Mahé de La Bourdonnais (Kingdom of France) Joseph François Dupleix

Strength
300	

The Battle of Madras or Fall of Madras took place in September 1746 during the War of the Austrian Succession when a French force attacked and captured the city of Madras from its British garrison.

French forces occupied Madras until the end of hostilities when it was exchanged for the British conquest of Louisbourg in North America as part of the Treaty of Aix-la-Chapelle. One of the British defenders, Robert Clive made his name by escaping from the French captors and carrying news of the city's fall to his superiors at Fort St David.

== Background ==
Since the 1720s the colonial rivalry between Britain and France in India had been growing in intensity. Following the French decision to join the War of the Austrian Succession on the opposing side to Britain, the British despatched a Royal Navy squadron under Commodore Curtis Barnett to raid and harass French settlements in India. During 1745 this force attacked a number of French ships, disrupting commerce, and ruining several leading French merchants.

In response the French despatched a similarly-sized fleet under the Bertrand-François Mahé de La Bourdonnais. After fighting an inconclusive battle the two fleets withdrew to repair, with the British retreating to Ceylon and the French using their base at Pondicherry. Wary of fighting another major naval battle – the British commander, Edward Peyton, chose to stay away from the Coramandel coast and withdrew to the safety of Bengal, leaving the British settlements on the Coramandel badly exposed to the French.

The French Governor of Pondicherry Dupleix authorised an attack on Madras. To gain local Indian approval for this he promised the Nawab of the Carnatic that he would hand over Madras to him once he had captured it from the British.

== Battle ==
On 7 September 1746 the inhabitants of Madras woke to find a French fleet sitting offshore – and an expedition of soldiers being landed on the shore. The French ships opened fire on the town – but with little effect, struggling to find the correct range and by nightfall a large portion of the garrison had been lulled into a false sense of security.

The following morning the French resumed their bombardment from both land and shore, this time with much more accuracy. The fortifications of Madras had been poorly constructed and were largely unable to resist such an attack. As the number of British casualties grew, the morale of the discipline of the troops collapsed. After a direct strike on the liquor stores, a number of soldiers abandoned their posts and drank themselves into a stupor. Civilians from the town took their places manning the defences – but it was clear resistance was collapsing.

== Surrender ==
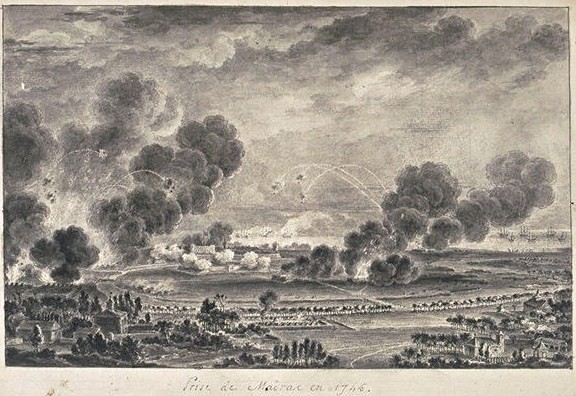
The siege of Madras in 1746 for Joseph Francois Dupleix troops and ships of La Bourdonnais. The city surrendered in September 1746. Madras was returned to England in 1748 to restore peace.

On 9 September the Governor of Madras, Nicholas Morse sued for peace. The terms offered to him by La Bourdonnais were surprisingly generous – the French were to take over the fort and warehouses, but the rest of the town would remain under British control. The British troops who had surrendered would be petitioned. This caused a dispute with his superior Joseph François Dupleix who favoured total French annexation of Madras. La Bourdonnais insisted on honouring the peace terms – and for a month the peace agreement he had signed held.

However, when a violent storm blew up in October, La Bourdonnais and his fleet were forced to withdraw and sail for the safety of Pondicherry – a third of his ships were lost in the storm and Dupleix was now in full command of Madras. Dupleix revoked the previously lenient terms and locked up a number of the garrison and civilians. He then set about looting and preparing to destroy Fort St George.

A handful of these prisoners led by Robert Clive, a young clerk, dressed up as natives and managed to slip out of their prison. Once outside they were challenged by real Indians, who spoke to them in languages they didn't understand. Clive and his companions hurried on before they could be exposed. After a three-day journey, made mostly by night, they reached Fort St David hundred miles away carrying news of the disastrous French attack on Madras. The story of Clive's escape was the first to bring him wider attention.

== Aftermath ==
The French occupied the town for the duration of the war. Despite Dupleix's promise earlier to hand the territory over to the Nawab of the Carnatic, Dupleix refused to do so. A force of 10,000 sent by the Nawab to enforce the agreement was routed by a small French force led by Captain Louis Paradis at the battle of Adyar on 24 October 1746. The French subsequently tried to take Fort St David but found the resistance much tougher, and were ultimately forced to withdraw.

The Treaty of Aix-la-Chapelle that ended the war made provision for Madras to be returned to the British in exchange for Louisbourg in Acadia which had been captured by British forces in 1745. The French besieged Madras again in 1759, this time without success.

== See also ==
- History of Chennai

== Bibliography ==
- Harvey, Robert (1998). Clive: The life and Death of a British Emperor. Hodder and Stoughton.
- Keay, John (1993). The Honourable Company: A History of the English East India Company. Harper Collins.
- Naravane, M.S. (2014). Battles of the Honorourable East India Company. A.P.H. Publishing Corporation. ISBN 9788131300343.
