= HMS Exeter (1697) =

Ship of the line of the Royal Navy

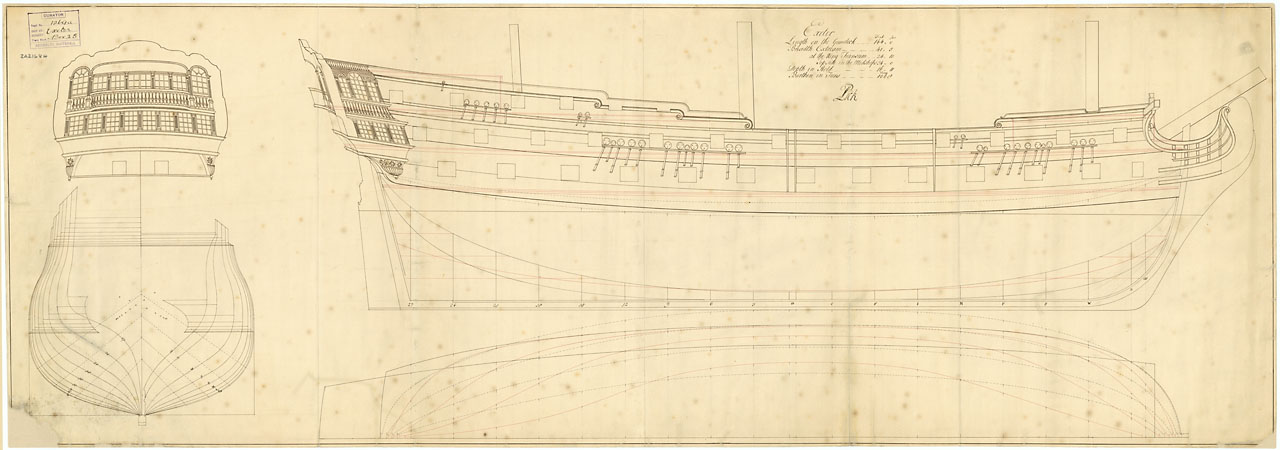
- Plan of Exeter's rebuild of 1744

History

Great Britain
- Name: HMS Exeter
- Builder: Bagwell, Portsmouth Dockyard
- Launched: 26 May 1697
- Fate: Broken up, 1763

General characteristics as built
- Class & type: 60-gun fourth-rate ship of the line
- Tons burthen: 949
- Length: 148 ft (45.1 m) (gundeck)
- Beam: 38 ft 2 in (11.6 m)
- Depth of hold: 15 ft 9 in (4.8 m)
- Propulsion: Sails
- Sail plan: Full-rigged ship
- Armament: 60 guns of various weights of shot

General characteristics after 1744 rebuild
- Class & type: 1733 proposals 60-gun fourth-rate ship of the line
- Tons burthen: 1068
- Length: 144 ft (43.9 m) (gundeck)
- Beam: 41 ft 5 in (12.6 m)
- Depth of hold: 16 ft 11 in (5.2 m)
- Propulsion: Sails
- Sail plan: Full-rigged ship
- Armament: 60 guns: Gundeck: 24 × 24 pdrs; Upper gundeck: 26 × 9 pdrs; Quarterdeck: 8 × 6 pdrs; Forecastle: 2 × 6 pdrs

HMS Exeter was a 60-gun fourth-rate ship of the line of the Royal Navy, launched at Portsmouth Dockyard on 26 May 1697.

She was involved in repeated actions against the French, in 1702 off Newfoundland, and in 1705 when she captured the frigate Thétis. She was in the Mediterranean in 1711, and at the Battle of Quiberon Bay. She was rebuilt according to the 1733 proposals of the 1719 Establishment at Plymouth, and relaunched on 19 March 1744. She was at the siege of Pondicherry in 1748. Samuel Hood, 1st Viscount Hood briefly served aboard her.

Exeter continued to serve until 1763, when she was broken up.
