= Battle of Adyar =

Battle of the First Carnatic War

- Part of Carnatic Wars; First Carnatic War
Date	24 October 1746
Location	Adyar river
Result	French victory
Territorial changes	Nawab of Arcot defeated

Belligerents
Mughal Empire: Nawab of Arcot	Kingdom of France: French East India Company

Commanders and leaders
Anwaruddin Khan; Mahfuz Khan	Louis Paradis

Strength
10,000 infantry and cavalry	350 French soldiers 700 French-trained Indian Sepoys

Casualties and losses
300	2 Sepoys killed

The Battle of Adyar (also the Battle of Adyar River) took place on 24 October 1746. The battle was between the French East India Company men and forces of Nawab of Arcot, Anwaruddin Khan over the St. George Fort, which was held by the French. It was part of the First Carnatic War between the British and the French.

== Background ==
The French captured Fort St. George from the British East Indian Company. Nawab of Arcot, a close ally of the British, set out to regain it by sending troops, led by his son Mahfuz Khan, to Madras. While leading an army of 10,000, he was dispersed by French forces, forcing him to move south. Khan seized San Thomé and formed a battle line on the north bank of the Adyar River on 22 October to prevent the French from moving up reinforcements from Pondicherry.

== Battle ==
Led by the Swiss engineering officer, Major Louis Paradis, some 350 French and 700 French-trained Indian troops force marched from Pondicherry, crossed Quibble Island and took positions on the south bank of the Adyar River and faced ineffective artillery fire from Khan's forces.

On 24 October, Paradis was informed that a similar sized army led by de le Tour was on its way from St. George Fort. He decided to ford the Adayar river to attack the rear of Mahfuz Khan's battle line. de la Tour arrived too late to support Paradis, who with disciplined firing and then charging with bayonets, broke the Nawab's line. Mahfuz Khan's troops fled and the Battle of the Adyar River, which began on the morning of 24 October 1746, ended that evening with the French retaining control over Fort St. George.

== Significance ==
The battle of Adyar was one of the first that illustrated the overwhelming superiority of 18th century European military firepower in the Indian sub-continent, while also demonstrating that even a sizeable cavalry force was no match for a well-equipped, disciplined infantry. The flintlock musket and a flexible and mobile artillery enabled around one thousand defenders of the French-held fort to vanquish ten thousand Mughal troops.

After the battle cemented the French position in Madras, they and the British continued to spar over French-controlled Pondicherry and British-held Fort St. David without either side gaining territory. The Treaty of Aix-la-Chappelle resulted in the French handing Madras back to the British, in exchange for Louisbourg in 1748.
