= Siege of Pondicherry (1748) =

British military operation of the First Carnatic War

The Siege of Pondichéry
- Part of The First Carnatic War
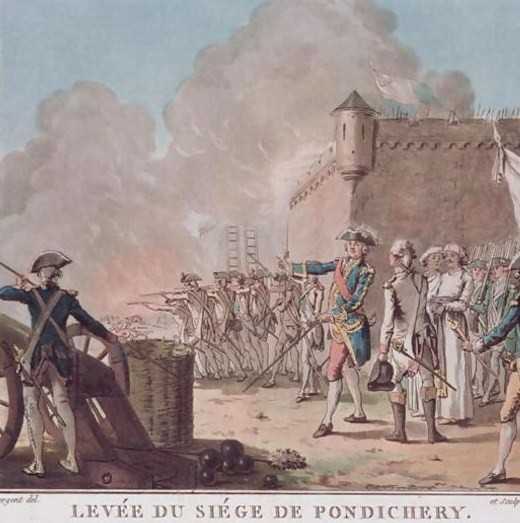
- A later artistic representation of the end of the siege, by Antoine Louis François Sergent dit Sergent-Marceau
Date	August – 27 October 1748
Location	Pondicherry (present-day India) 11°56′N 79°50′E
Result	French victory

Belligerents
Kingdom of Great Britain	Kingdom of France: French East India Company

Commanders and leaders
(Kingdom of Great Britain) Edward Boscawen	(Kingdom of France) Joseph François Dupleix
- Location within Puducherry Siege of Pondicherry (1748) (India)

The siege of Pondicherry (August – October 1748) was conducted by British forces against a French East India Company garrison under the command of Governor-General Joseph François Dupleix at the Indian port of Pondicherry. The British siege strategy, conducted with inexperience in siege tactics by Admiral Edward Boscawen, was lifted with the arrival of monsoon rains, on 27 October 1748. The siege was the last major action of the First Carnatic War, as the Indian theatre of the War of the Austrian Succession is sometimes known.
