= Siege of Cuddalore (1748) =

1748 battle

- Part of War of the Austrian Succession
Date	17 June 1748
Location	Cuddalore, India
Result	British victory

Belligerents
Great Britain	France

Commanders and leaders
(Kingdom of Great Britain) Stringer Lawrence Robert Clive	(Kingdom of France) Mahé de La Bourdonnais (Kingdom of France) Joseph Dupleix

Strength
400 men	800 Europeans; 1,000 natives

Casualties and losses
Light	Heavy

The siege of Cuddalore was a battle during the War of the Austrian Succession on 17 June 1748.

After a British raiding squadron left for Madras, Joseph François Dupleix decided to make another attack on Cuddalore, where the British had taken refuge after the fall of Madras. He was assisted by Bertrand-François Mahé de La Bourdonnais. Commanding a force of 800 Europeans and 1,000 Indian sepoys, Dupleix marched from Pondicherry and arrived on the hills at Bandapolam, three miles from Cuddalore, on the morning of 17 June. Planning to take the town by surprise, Dupleix stopped until night. Forewarned of the advance, major Lawrence Stringer (who had arrived in India in January 1748 to command the East India Company's forces and had formed the first regular Company battalion on the Coromandel coast) managed to thwart this attempt with a force of no more than 400 men by removing the garrison and taking away the guns to Fort St. David, to make the French believe the British were unable to hold it.

When night arrived, however, Stringer led his men and guns back into Cuddalore, so that when the French attacked on the stroke of midnight and tried to put their scaling ladders against the town walls they were met with such a hail of musket-fire and gunshot that their advance was stopped dead. In the ensuing panic, the French made a hasty retreat to Pondicherry, with notable losses.

== Sources ==
- William Freke Williams, William Cooke Stafford, England’s Battles by Sea and Land : History of England’s campaigns in India and China; and of the Indian mutiny, 1857-1859, vol. 3, London; New York, Printing and publishing company, 1863, p. 33-37.
