= Fort St. David =

Fort in Tamil Nadu, India

Fort St David
- Part of Tamil Nadu
- Cuddalore district, Tamil Nadu, India
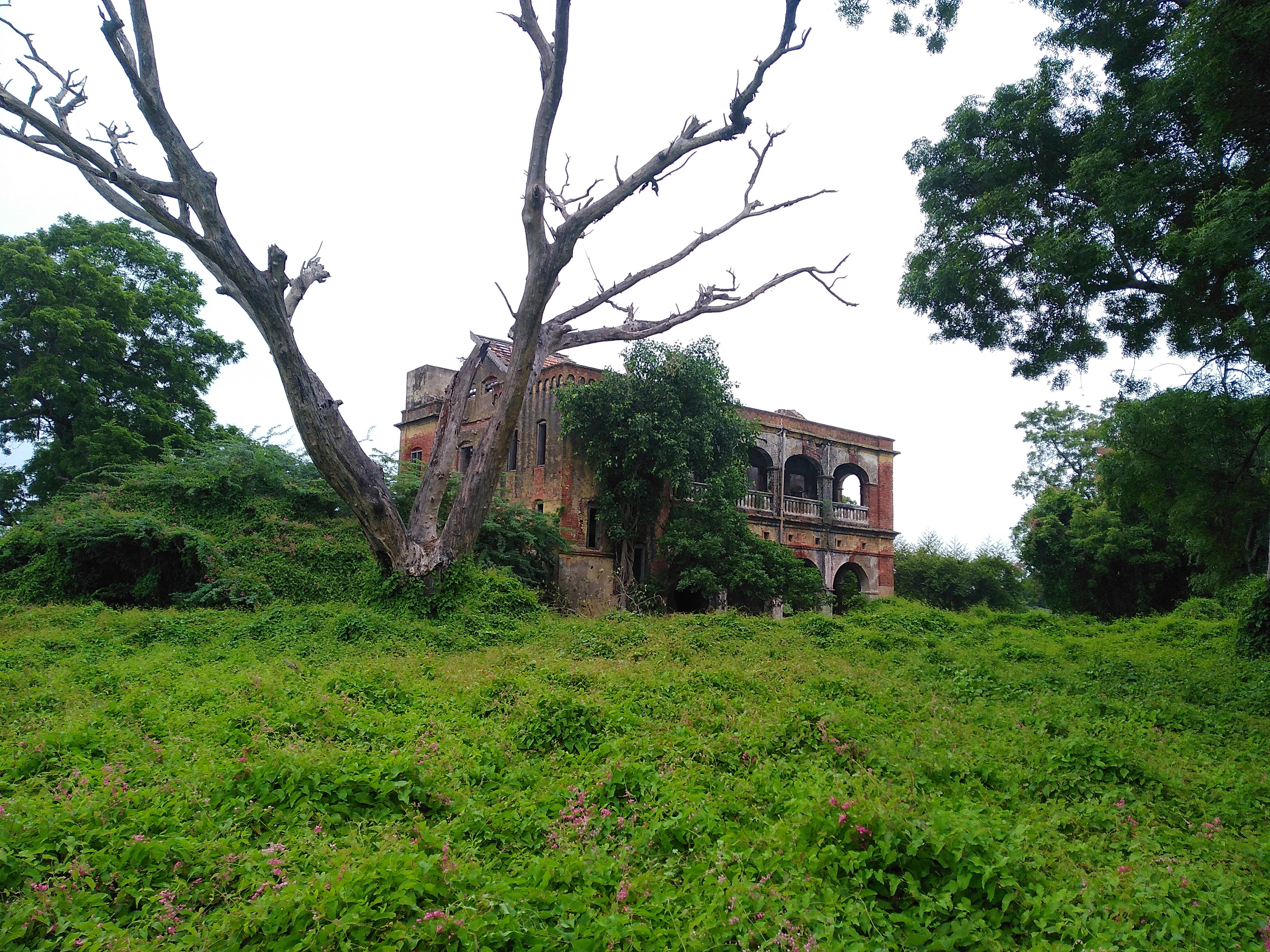
- Current condition of Fort St.David

Site information
- Type: Fort
- Controlled by: Government of Tamil Nadu
- Condition: Ruins

Location
- Location within Tamil Nadu
- Coordinates: 11°44′25″N 79°46′52″E

Fort St David, now in ruins, was a British fort in the town of Cuddalore, a hundred miles south of Chennai on the Coromandel Coast of India. It is located near silver beach without any maintenance. It was named for the patron saint of Wales because the governor of Madras at the time, Elihu Yale, was Welsh.

== History ==
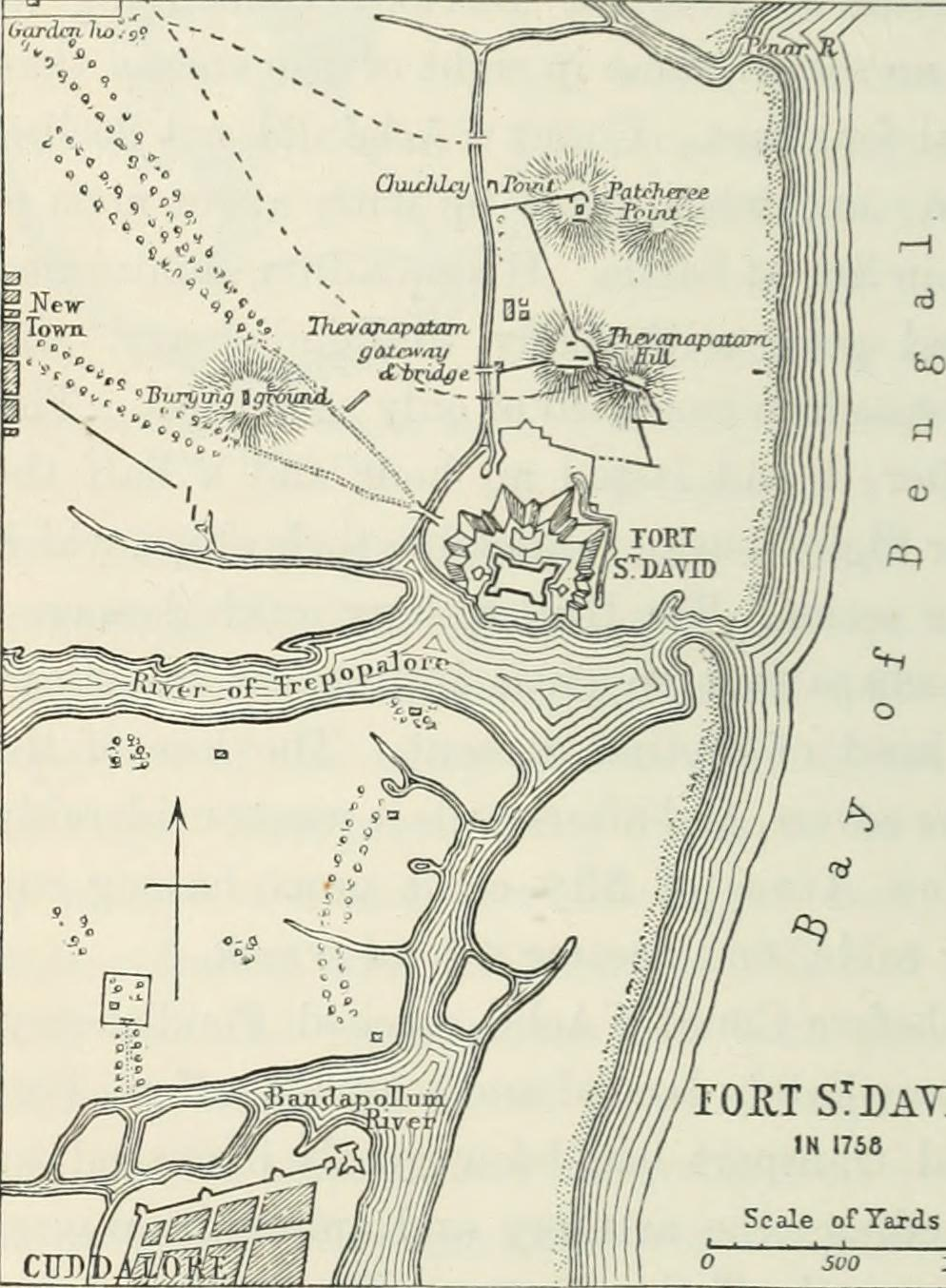
Fort St David in 1758

Fort St David, situated on the mouth of River Gadilam, has a memorable history. The region was under the domains of the Nayaks of Gingee. The Dutch in early 17th century wishing to expand their trade in the Bay of Bengal region and take advantage of the local manufacturing of goods choose the Cuddalore region and sought the permission of Krishnappa Nayaka of Gingee, to build a fort at Devanampatnam which was, subsequently granted in 1608 and construction was started. But the Nayak pulled back after the Portuguese, then dominant players at the Coramandal Coast trade, pressured Gingee's overlord rulers, Venkata I of Vijayanagara Empire to prevent Dutch entry. Therefore, the fort was left with the Gingee Nayaks under appointed traders. Overseas trade continued and the port became an important source of sandalwood, camphor, cloves, nutmeg, mace, green velvet, porcelain, copper, and brass. The fort was built by balija merchant chinnia chetti.

Later when Gingee was occupied by the Marathas, Shivaji's son Rajaram Chhatrapati who was under siege in Gingee fort by the Mughal army intended to sell the Devanampatnam fort to the highest European bidder. In 1690, the British won by out bidding the Dutch and the French. Elihu Yale, Governor of Madras, after long protracted negotiations, acquired the fort and named it Fort Saint David after a Welsh Saint.

The purchase price included not only the fort but also the adjacent towns and villages within the range of a random shot of a piece of ordnance. A great gun was fired to different points of the compass and all the country within its range, including the town of Cuddalore, passed into the possession of the English. The villages thus obtained are still spoken of as "cannonball villages".

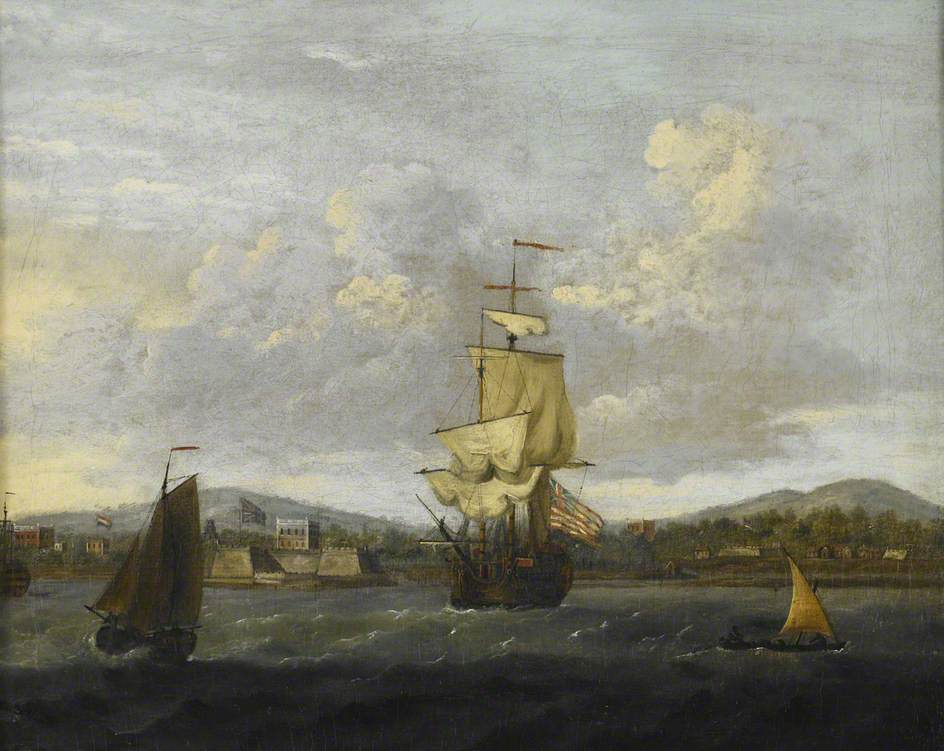
Fort St. David, c. 1763, Francis Swaine

James Macrae had been governor of the fort and in 1725 he became the Governor of the Madras Presidency. From 1725 onwards the British greatly strengthened the fortifications. In 1746 Fort St David became the British headquarters for the southern India, and attacks by French forces under Dupleix were successfully repulsed. Robert Clive was appointed its governor in 1756; in 1758 the French captured it, forcing the destruction of two Royal Navy vessels then in port (Note: The Royal Navy vessels lost in the French capture of the Fort were two 24-gun sixth-rates, HMS Bridgewater and HMS Tryton. Both were run aground and burned.). It was abandoned by French forces two years later and retaken by a British detachment under the command of Sir Eyre Coote.

In 1782 the French again retook the fort and restored it sufficiently to withstand a British attack in 1783. In 1785 it finally passed into British possession. With the end of the French threat, it was abandoned and fell into ruins.
