= Siege of Trichinopoly (1743) =

1743 siege and capture of Trichinopoly by Nizam of Hyderabad

Coordinates: 10°48′18″N 78°41′08″E

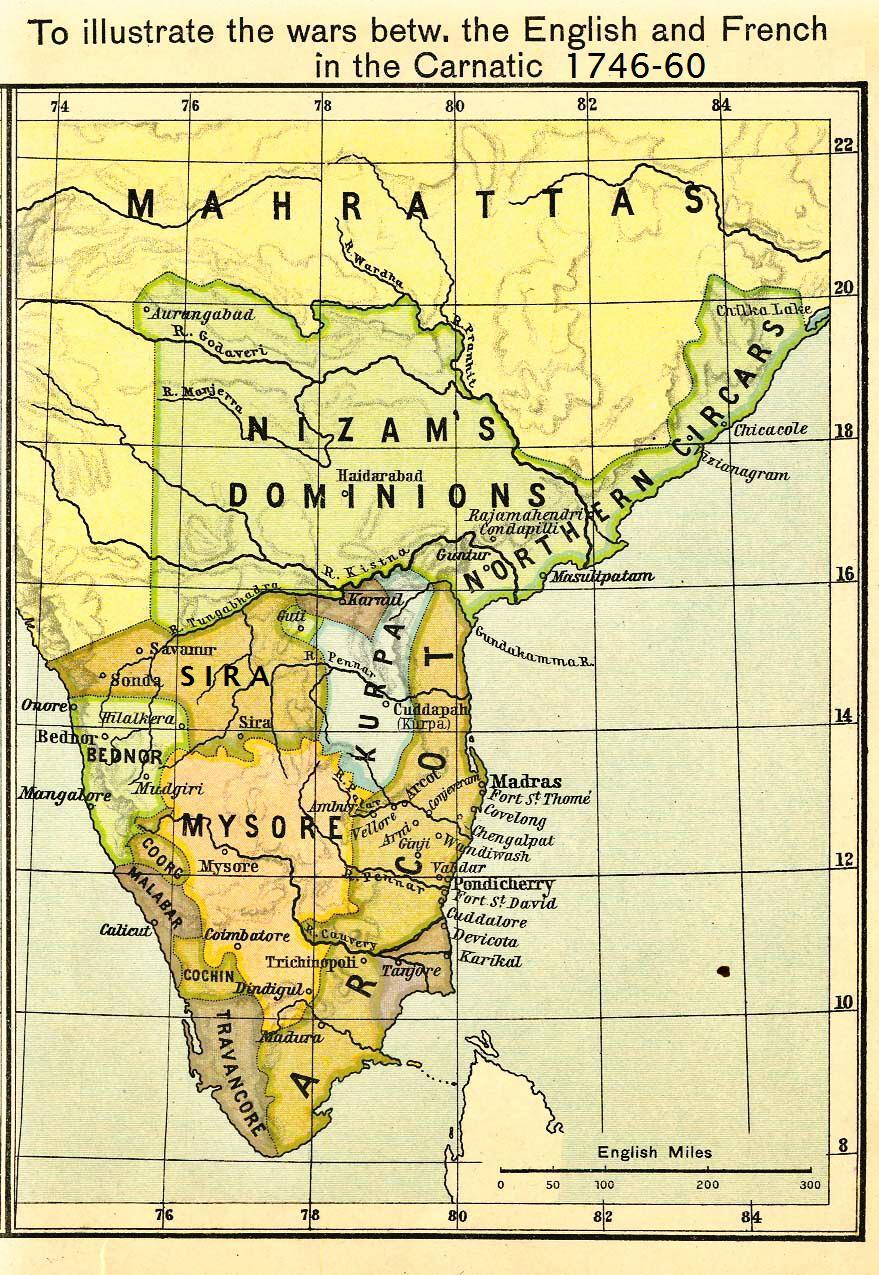
- Map of the Carnatic region in 1746
Date	14 March 1743 – 29 August 1743
Location	Trichinopoly, modern-day Tamil Nadu, India
Result	Nizam victory
Territorial changes	Nizam captures Trichinopoly

Belligerents
Maratha Empire	Nizam of Hyderabad

Commanders and leaders
Murari Rao	Nizam I

Strength
2,000 Sowars; 4,000 sepoy	80,000 Sowars; 200,000 sepoy 150 war elephants 200 artillery pieces

Casualties and losses
unknown	unknown

The siege of Trichinopoly (14 March 1743 – 29 August 1743) was part of an extended series of conflicts between the Nizam of Hyderabad and the Maratha Empire for control of the Carnatic region. On 29 August 1743, after a six-month siege, Murari Rao surrendered, giving Nizam ul Mulk (Nizam) the suzerainty of Trichinopoly. By the end of 1743, the Nizam had regained full control of Deccan. This stopped the Maratha interference in the region and ended their hegemony over the Carnatic. The Nizam resolved the internal conflicts among the regional hereditary nobles (Nawabs) for the seat of governor (Subedar) of Arcot State, and monitored the activities of the British East India company and French East India Company by limiting their access to ports and trading.

== Background ==
In 1714, the Mughal Emperor Farrukhsiyar appointed Nizam-ul-Mulk (also known as Nizam, Nizam I, and Asaf Jah I) as Viceroy of the Deccan. Deccan consisted of six Mughal governorates (Subah): Khandesh, Bijapur, Berar, Aurangabad, Hyderabad, Bidar; the Carnatic region was a sub-Subah administered partly by the governors of Bijapur and Hyderabad. In 1721, the Nizam was commissioned to Delhi and became the Prime Minister of the Mughal Empire. His differences with the court nobles led him to resign from all the imperial responsibilities in 1723 and leave for Deccan.

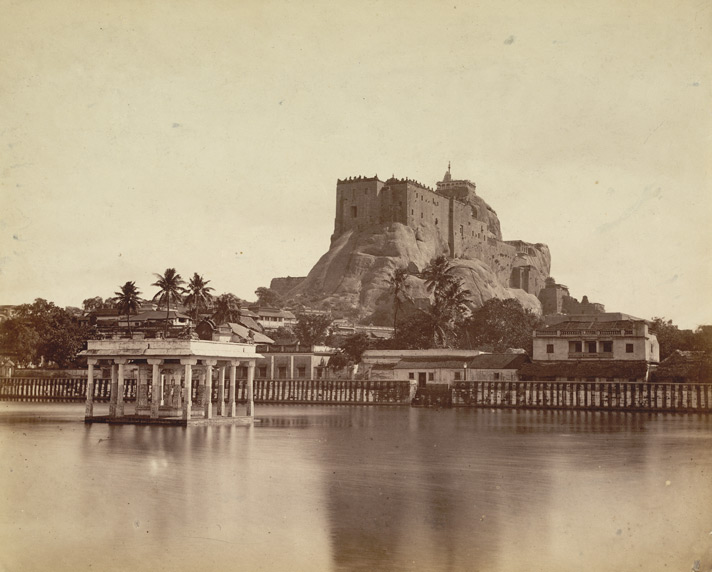
Tiruchirapalli Rock Fort (pictured 1860) was occupied by Nizam during the siege of Trichinopoly.

Under the influence of the Nizam's opponents, Mughal Emperor Muhammad Shah issued a decree to Mubariz Khan, the governor of Hyderabad, to prevent the Nizam from taking the Deccan province under his control. Nizam and Mubariz Khan confronted each other at Shaker Kheda (a valley in present-day Buldhana district, Berar Subah, 80 kilometres (50 mi) from Aurangabad), resulting in the Battle of Shakar Kheda. On 11 October 1724, the Nizam defeated and killed Mubariz Khan, establishing autonomous rule over the Deccan region. The Nizam remained loyal to the Mughal Emperor, did not assume any imperial title, and continued to acknowledge Mughal suzerainty. The region was renamed Hyderabad Deccan, beginning what is known as the Asaf Jahi dynasty. The Nizam retained the title of "Nizam ul-Mulk", and was referred to as "Asaf Jahi Nizam", or more commonly, the Nizam of Hyderabad. He acquired de facto control over the Deccan and thus all six Mughal governorates became his feudatory.

In the 1720s, the Carnatic region of southern India was an autonomous dominion of the Mughal Empire under the suzerainty of the Nizam of Hyderabad. In 1710, the Nizam appointed Muhammed Saadatullah Khan as Nawab of the Carnatic. Saadatullah died in 1732, and would be succeeded by his nephew Dost Ali Khan. Tukkoji Bhonsle, who was a Maratha ruler of Trichinopoly, died in 1736. He left his son Ekoji II to succeed him and his wife Rani Minakshi, who was acting as a regent for her young son. Dost Ali sent Chanda Sahib, his son-in-law and diwan, to the province and to claim that it owed tribute payments (chauth). Chanda Sahib inveigled into the court of Rani Minakshi, abused her trust to the fortress, and threw her into prison where she died of grief. In 1739, Dost Ali rewarded Chanda Sahib with the title Nawab of Trichinopoly.

This decisive act and the refusal of tributary payment by Dost Ali Khan enraged the Marathas. They took advantage of the absence of the Nizam in Deccan due to his engagement in resolving disputes in North India. In 1740, Raghoji I Bhonsle commanded the Maratha army of 50,000 soldiers in an invasion of the Carnatic region. In the Battle at Damalcherry, a pass near Arcot, Dost Ali was killed. His son and successor Safdar Ali Khan negotiated and agreed to make tribute payments to the Marathas. But Chanda Sahib, confident of his defense, refused to negotiate with Raghoji I Bhonsle, pay tribute, or surrender control of Trichinopoly. In Raghoji I Bhonsle's 1741 siege of Trichinopoly, Chanda Sahib initially resisted the siege. The Marathas bribed an officer who betrayed Chanda Sahib and left a free opening to the Maratha army through an important mountain post. The Marathas occupied Trichinopoly and took Chanda Sahib as prisoner to Satara. Murari Rao Ghorpade was installed as the Maratha governor of Trichinopoly in 1741.

== Prelude ==
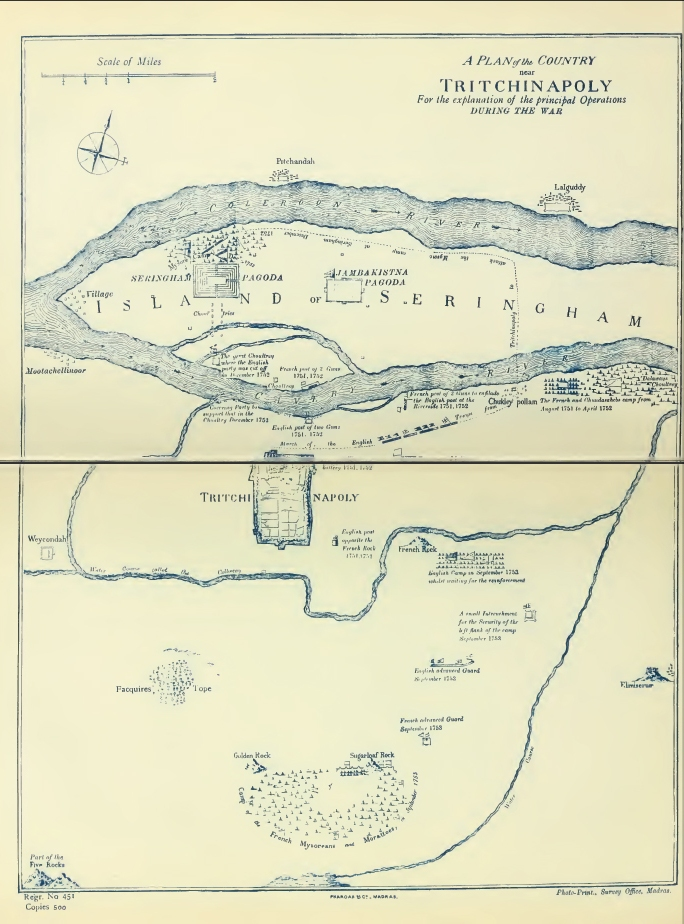
Siege of Tiruchirappalli (Trichinopoly) during the Carnatic wars of 1751

In 1741, the Nizam had just returned from Delhi. He was resolving a dispute between Muhammad Shah and Nadir Shah, who had invaded Northern India. The Nizam demanded that Safdar Ali, who was recognized as the Nawab of Carnatic, settle the debts of Subah Deccan. Safdar Ali, who had recently negotiated with the Marathas to an agreement of the indemnity and tributary payments, was hardly in a position to meet the demands of the Nizam and the Marathas. To manage these double payments, he imposed an additional levy on his regional town administrators. Safdar Ali's brother-in-law, Nawab Murtuza Ali Khan, an administrator of Vellore, refused to pay the increased levy. He prepared a plot with his wife (who was also the sister of Safdar Ali), and murdered Safdar Ali to declare himself as Nawab of the Carnatic. This declaration irritated other nobles and brought Nawab Saeed Muhammad Khan, the son of Safdar Ali who was in Madras, to be recognized as the Nawab of the Carnatic.

In 1742, the Nizam, who was busy with the affairs in Delhi, returned to the Deccan. After the invasion of Nadir Shah in Delhi, the Mughals were not in a position to stop the Marathas in the Carnatic region. The Nizam was enraged to see the rebellion of Nawab of Arcot and the Maratha occupation of the Carnatic, particularly Trichinopoly. He thought about invading the Carnatic to reestablish his authority as the Viceroy of Deccan. However, in January 1743, Dalavayi Devarajaiya of Mysore, after establishing his hold on the Carnatic region, offered the Nizam 10,000,000 rupees in exchange for Trichinopoly. The Nizam accepted the offer and assured Dalavayi that Trichinopoly will be brought under his control. In February 1743, the Nizam marched towards the Carnatic region from Hyderabad.

== Siege ==
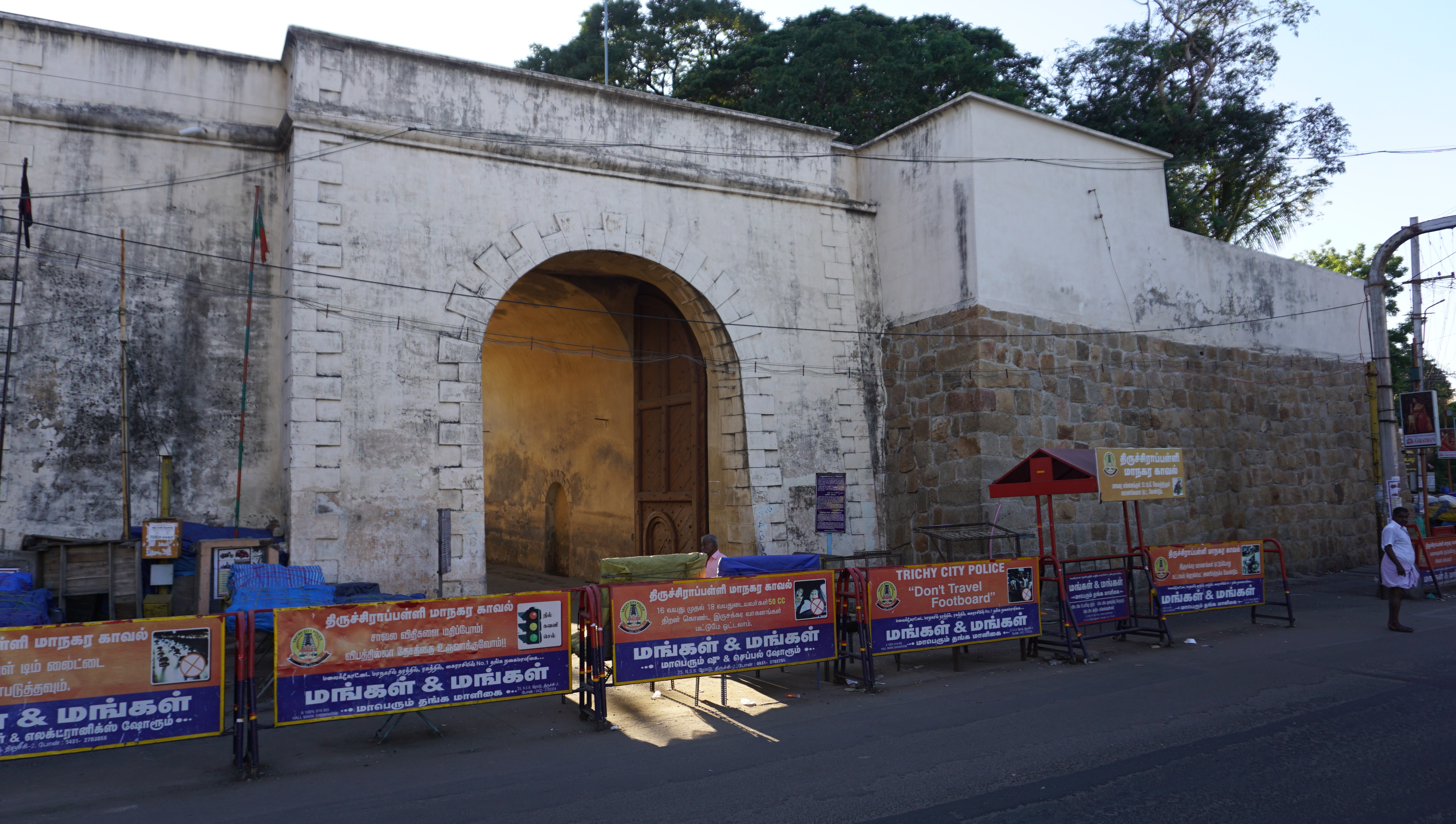
Gateway of Tiruchirappalli Fort barricaded by city police to avoid traffic congestion

After deposing Muhammed Saadatullah Khan II in Arcot, the Nizam marched towards Trichinopoly. On 14 March 1743, Nizam arrived at Trichinopoly with a large army of 200,000 sepoy, 80,000 Sowar, and 150 war elephants and 200 elephant carried artillery pieces. Nizam camped in the vicinity of Trichinopoly fort and summoned Maratha Governor Murari Rao to present himself in the camp and surrender the fort, failing to which he would siege the fort. Murari Rao dressed in gauntlet decided to defend the fort with 4000 sepoy, 2000 Sowar and a considerable number of artillery that consisted of canons, guns, mortar and grenades. Nizam ordered a siege and his forces installed barracks strategically in the outer three enclosures of the fort, blocking the gateways and mounting cannons towards the defensive walls, to which initially Murari Rao strongly retaliated by constantly firing cannonballs, bullets and grenades from the turrets and bastions of the fort, which kept the Nizam's forces at a distance and protected the defensive walls from attack and wall scaling. Nizam intended to win the siege through attrition, keeping his numerically superior army and artillery on hold, diplomatically avoiding any aggressive action and conflicts with Murari Rao's army.

Murari Rao could not expect any help from his Maratha superiors, as Maratha Emperor Shahu I was actively engaged in the expeditions to expand Maratha supremacy over the Mughal-held Delhi, Bengal and Odisha. Meanwhile, internal conflicts erupted between the Maratha general Raghoji I Bhonsle and Peshwa Balaji Baji Rao, which later caused the Maratha empire to disintegrate. Murari Rao surrendered to the Nizam and came to an agreement whereby the Nizam offered him governance of the hill-fort of Penukonda, the adjacent areas, and 200,000 rupees. The six-month siege ended on 29 August 1743. The surrender of Trichinopoly along with the Madurai territory (administered by the Maratha Lieutenant officer Appaji Rao, captured in 1741) brought an end to the Maratha suzerainty of the Carnatic region, which they lost direct rule over; the Nizam regained the authority over the Deccan region.

As per the agreement of Trichinopoly, if Dalavayi wanted control of Trichinopoly he would have to pay 10,000,000 rupees to the Nizam. The Dalavayi could not pay the sum, as he suffered from a financial crisis after paying heavy tributary taxes, which included 50,000,000 rupees to Maratha ruler Raghoji in 1740–1741 after the Maratha invasion of the Carnatic region. In October 1743, the Nizam left for Golconda.

== Aftermath ==
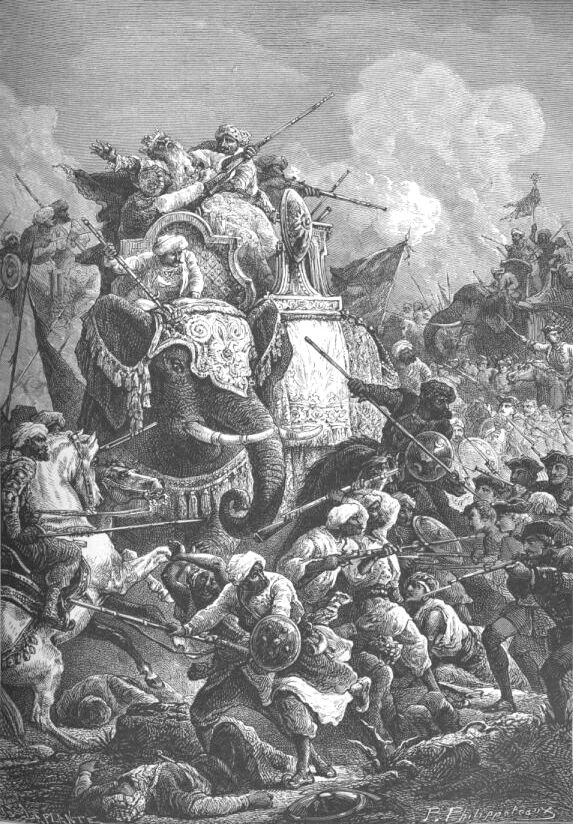
The killing of Anwaruddin Khan at the Battle of Ambur in 1749 by French sharpshooters mounted on elephants – depiction by Paul Philippoteaux

When the Nizam took control of Trichinopoly in September 1743, he appointed Khwaja Abdullah as the governor of the city. Khwaja Abdullah accompanied the Nizam to Golconda and left his son, Nimathullah Khan, as the deputy governor of Trichinopoly. They reached Golconda in March 1744, the same year Khwaja Abdullah died on the eve of his departure from Golconda. Thus, the Nizam appointed Anwaruddin Khan as regent, and Saadatullah Khan II, being an infant, was appointed as the Nawab of the Carnatic; he was assassinated by Murtuza Ali Khan in 1744. In 1749, when Anwaruddin Khan died in the Battle of Ambur, his son and deputy governor Muhammed Ali Khan Wallajah were dethroned by Chanda Sahib and sought refuge in Trichinopoly where he set up his base.

From 1744 to 1746, two expeditions were sent by Maratha Emperor Shahu I to expand the Maratha supremacy over the Carnatic region. Babuji Naik of Baramati led the first expedition, which was defeated when he was confronted by Anwaruddin Khan of Arcot and Muzaffar Jung, who had been assigned by the Nizam. The second expedition took place in 1746, led by Babuji Naik and Fateh Singh Bhonsle of Akkalkot; they were unsuccessful at taking back Trichinopoly and were defeated by the Nizam's army. In 1746, three years after the siege, the Marathas, under the rule of Peshwa Balaji Bajirao, sent a military expedition to Carnatic led by Sadashivrao Bhau. The Maratha army overran the region and brought it under their control. Nizam's army, under the rule of Nasir Jung, tried to obstruct the Marathas, but were repulsed by Sadashivrao Bhau. Maratha influence in the Carnatic subsequently waned, opening the way for the French and British East India Companies to split the region between themselves.

The subsequent Siege of Trichinopoly (1751–1752) by Chanda Sahib took place during the Second Carnatic War, with Muhammed Ali Khan Wallajah and the British East India Company on one side and Chanda Sahib and the French East India Company on the other. The British won and Wallajah regained the throne as the Nawab of Arcot. During his reign, he proposed renaming the city Natharnagar after the Sufi saint Nathar Vali, who is thought to have lived there in the 12th century.

== See also ==
- Anglo-Maratha Wars
- Carnatic Wars
- Nizams of Hyderabad
