= Battle of Ambur =

1748 battle of the Second Carnatic War

- Part of the Second Carnatic War
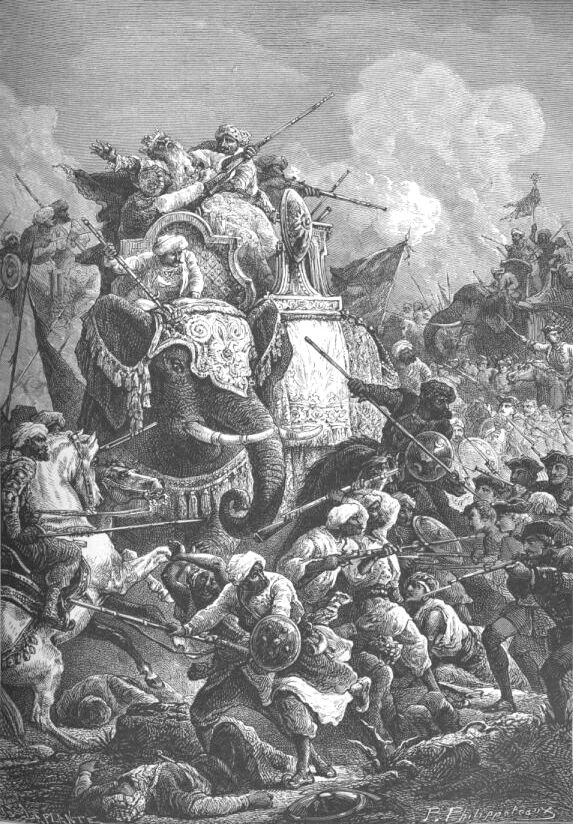
- Engraving depicting the death of the Nawab of the Carnatic at Ambur (also note: the sharpshooter upon the elephants)
Date	3 August 1749
Location	Ambur
Result	Allied victory
Territorial changes	Chanda Sahib is declared the Nawab of the Carnatic

Belligerents
Mughal Empire: Nawab of Arcot	Kingdom of France: French Indies Company; Nizam of Hyderabad

Commanders and leaders
Anwaruddin Khan †	Joseph François Dupleix; De Bussy Chanda Sahib; Muzaffar Jung

Strength
20,000 total 100 war elephants	36,000 total 400 Frenchmen

Casualties and losses
4,000	1,500

The Battle of Ambur (3 August 1749) was the first major battle of the Second Carnatic War.

The battle was initiated by Muzaffar Jung and supported by Joseph François Dupleix and led by Chanda Sahib, who sought to overthrow Anwaruddin Muhammed Khan, the Nawab of the Carnatic, for supporting Nasir Jung's claim to be Nizam of Hyderabad. French forces were decisive in giving the allies victory; Anwaruddin Muhammed Khan was killed in the battle and Chanda Sahib seized control of the Carnatic.

== Background ==
Since the beginning of the Second Carnatic War Anwaruddin Muhammed Khan, the Nawab of the Carnatic, had warned the Mughal Emperor Muhammad Shah of an irreversible power struggle in the Carnatic and how he wanted his interests to be legitimized by Nizam-ul-Mulk, the Nizam of Hyderabad who had nominated him in the first place.

Nizam-ul-Mulk died in 1748 and was succeeded as Nizam by his grandson Muzaffar Jung. This decision was confirmed by the Mughal Emperor Ahmad Shah Bahadur but rejected by Nasir Jung, Nizam-ul-Mulk's son, who captured the city of Hyderabad after a coup.

Muzaffar Jung fled Hyderabad and tried to gain new allies. He received the support of the French Governor-General Joseph François Dupleix, who helped release Chanda Sahib the son-in-law of Dost Ali Khan, who was imprisoned after being overrun by the Marathas and after his father-in-law was killed in the fray. Chanda Sahib sought the investiture of the Mughal Emperor Ahmad Shah Bahadur by declaring himself Nawab of Tinnevelly and gathered his own army of 3500 men and even received 400 French infantry from Dupleix. Because Muzaffar Jung was the chosen successor of Nizam-ul-Mulk his loyalists exceed 30,000. Together they marched towards Arcot, the capital of the Carnatic and sought to eliminate Anwaruddin Muhammed Khan, who supported Nasir Jung's claim to the Hyderabadi throne.

Instead of entrenching himself in Arcot, Anwaruddin Muhammed Khan decided to advance towards the allied forces with his own 20,000 battle-strong army.

== Battle ==
On 3 August 1749, the allied forces of Dupleix, Chanda Sahib and Muzaffar Jung met those of Anwaruddin Muhammed Khan at Ambur. Anwaruddin Muhammed Khan's forces managed to create a formidable stance by gathering around their howdahs despite being outnumbered 3 to 1, but it was the disciplined French infantry forces led by De Bussy that completely reversed the course of the battle against Khan.

Anwaruddin Muhammed Khan was shot and killed in a fierce confrontation while commanding his forces from a howdah. The next day Muzaffar Jang and Chanda Sahib victoriously entered Arcot and Chanda Sahib became the next Nawab of the Carnatic. Anwaruddin Muhammed Khan's son, Muhammed Ali Khan Wallajah, fled south to Trichinopoly, where he hid and sought the assistance of the British.

== Aftermath ==
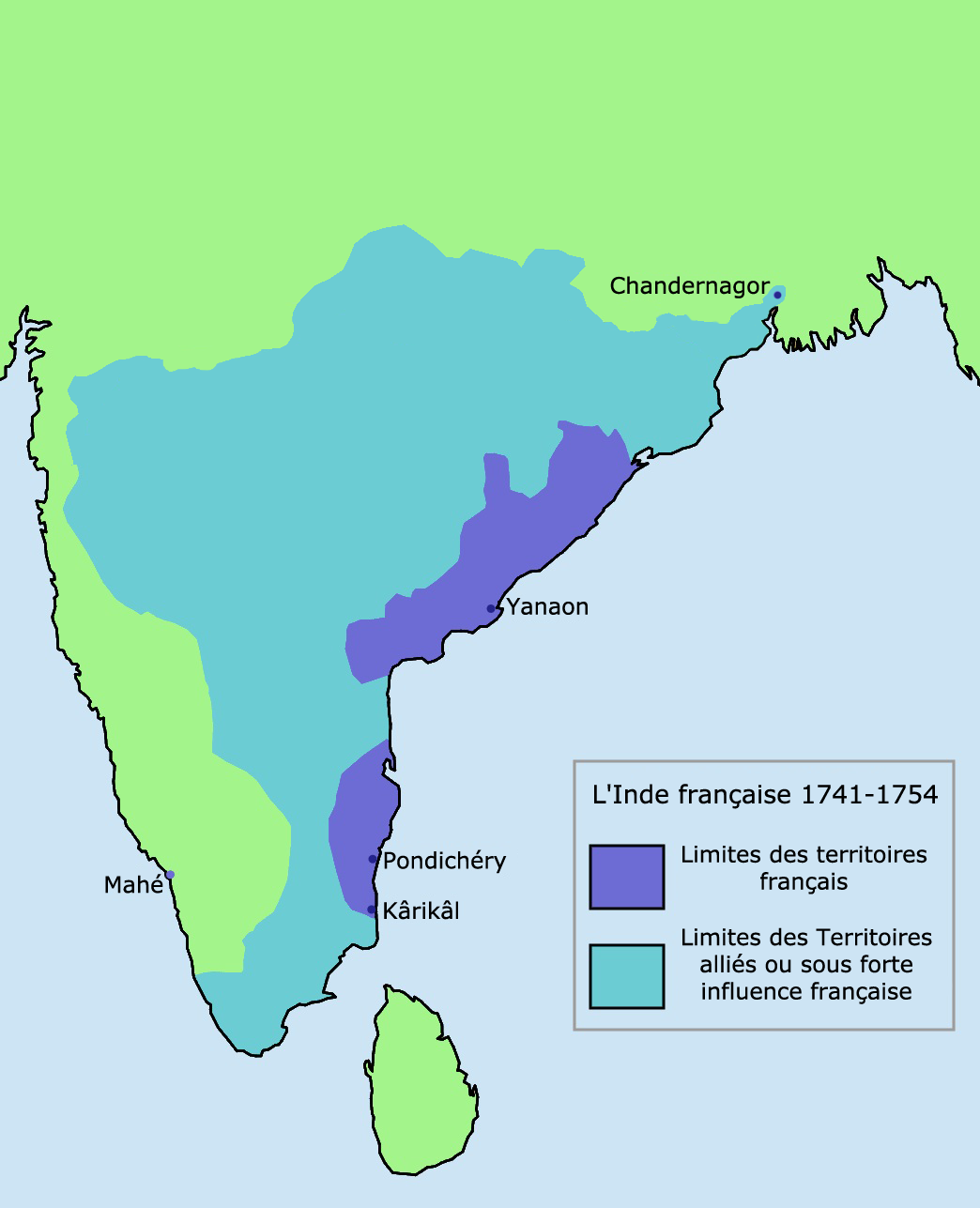
French Indies Company influence 1741–1754.

The Battle of Ambur convincingly demonstrated the superiority of European arms and methods of discipline and infantry warfare.

== See also ==
- Carnatic Wars
- Ahmad Shah Bahadur
