= Chanda Sahib's invasion of Travancore =

1740 military expedition of the Carnatic Sultanate

Chanda Sahib invasion of Travancore
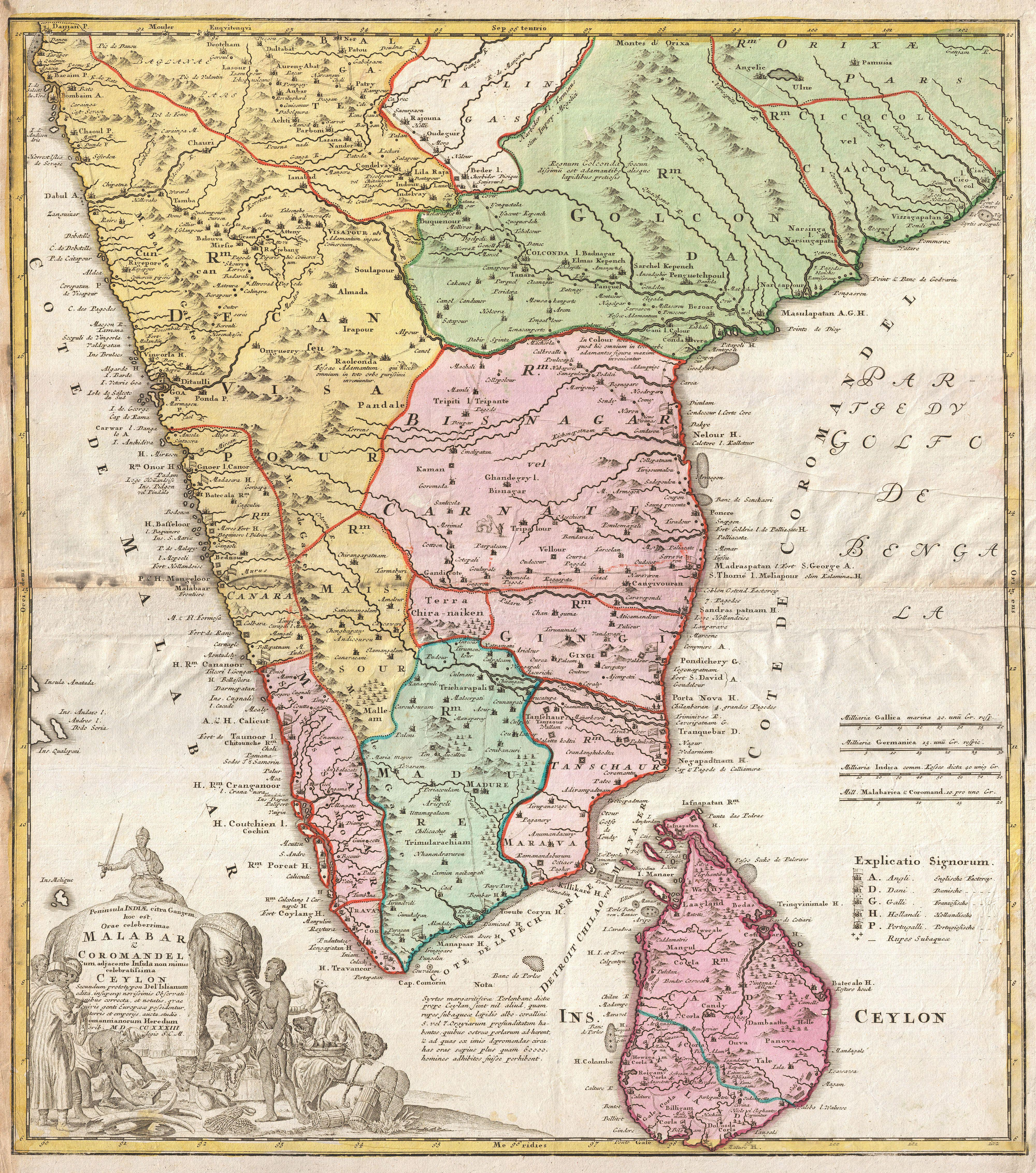
- Map of south India as of 1733
Date	March 1740
Location	Travancore 8.231200°N 77.506000°E
Result	Carnatic Sultanate victory
Territorial changes	See aftermath section

Belligerents
Carnatic Sultanate	Travancore

Commanders and leaders
Chanda Sahib; Baba Sahib	Marthanda Varma; Ramayya Dalawa
- Thovalai, the region captured by Chanda Sahib. Thovalai (India)

Chanda Sahib's invasion of Travancore was a military expedition of the Carnatic Sultanate under Chanda Sahib against the Kingdom of Travancore in 1740, in South India. In the event, the Carnatic Sultanate invaded the Kingdom of Travancore, resulting in the Carnatic forces defeating the Travancore army led by Ramayyan Dalawa.

Chanda Sahib occupied Travancore territories such as Nagarcoil, Suchindram and Kottar. Marthanda Varma, the Travancore King, offered presents to Dost Ali Khan, the Nawab of the Carnatic Sultanate. Dost Ali Khan accepted the presents and gave the territories back to Travancore.

== Background ==
Marthanda Varma ruled the Kingdom of Travancore from 1729 to 1758. His reign saw conflicts with the Dutch East India Company. Meanwhile, the Carnatic Sultanate was under the rule of Nawab Dost Ali Khan, with Chanda Sahib serving as the Nawab's General and also his son-in-law.

In March 1740, Dost Ali Khan, the Nawab of Arcot, dispatched Chanda Sahib and Baba Sahib to conquer certain territories on behalf of his son, Safdar Ali Khan. Chanda Sahib and Safdar Ali Khan advanced towards Travancore with the Carnatic army, eventually reaching its territories. The Travancore army, already engaged in war with the Dutch in the north of the kingdom, were already deployed there. Therefore, Travancore struggled to focus on repelling the Sultanate's invasion.

Chanda Sahib's forces achieved a successful invasion of Travancore's territories, capturing places like Nagercoil, Suchindram, and Kottar. The Travancore forces, led by Ramayyan Dalawa, suffered defeat, and Chanda Sahib's army captured Tovala..

== Aftermath ==
Following the invasion, Marthanda Varma offered 120,000 gold coins and 6 elephants to Dost Ali Khan, who accepted the presents and gave the territories back to Marthanda Varma. Once the Travancore–Dutch War was over, Marthanda Varma focused his attention on the southern border of his kingdom. His Dutch-born general Eustachius De Lannoy demolished the former mud fortifications and replaced them with masonary walls, bastions and about 50 artillery pieces (the Aramboly lines) covering the road at the mountain pass at Aralvaimozhi to ensure that future invasions would be repelled. To mitigate any risks of further wars, Travancore also promised to pay the Nawab a sum of 6000 Travancore Rupees and an elephant each year, in return for the Nawab's military help in dealing with any internal and external enemies.

== See also ==
- Battle of Colachel
