= Carnatic Treaty =

1801 treaty between Arcot and Great Britain

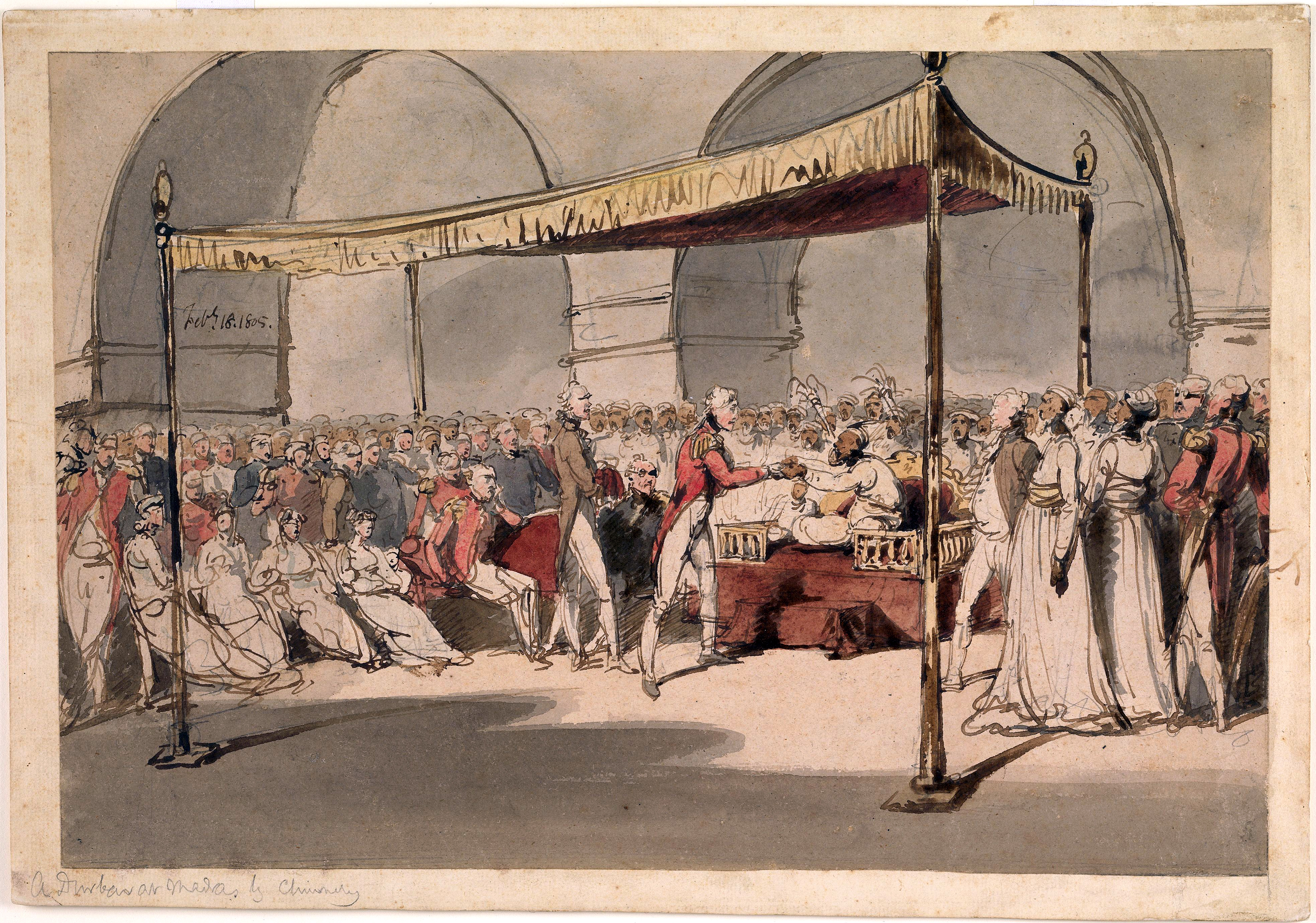
Nawab Azim-ud-Daula and Major-General Arthur Wellesley sign the Carnatic Treaty at Chepauk Palace.

The Carnatic Treaty was signed on 26 July 1801. It is a treaty between the Nawab of Arcot and the East India Company. It is one of the treaties by which the British Empire acquired its rule over the Indian subcontinent or later known as British India. The treaty entailed that the Nawab was to cede the districts of North Arcot, South Arcot, Tiruchirappalli, Madurai and Tirunelveli to the company, and transfer all the administrative powers to it.

== Background ==
The treaty resulted in the liquidation of all the local chieftains of Tamil Nadu and the East India Company assumed direct control over Tamil Nadu. The Palayakkarar system came to an end as they had to demolish all forts and disband their armies. It resulted in the company having full command over the region.

== Consequences ==
East India Company and the Nabobs of the Carnatic Act 1806
- Act of Parliament
- Parliament of the United Kingdom
- Long title: An Act for enabling the Commissioners acting in Execution of an Agreement made between the East India Company and the private Creditors of the Nabobs of the Carnatic, the better to carry the same into Effect.
- Citation: 46 Geo. 3. c. cxxxiii
- Territorial extent: United Kingdom

Dates
- Royal assent: 21 July 1806
- Commencement: 21 July 1806 (Note: The Acts of Parliament (Commencement) Act 1793.)
- Expired: 1 August 1810 (Note: Section 12.)
- Repealed: 21 July 2008

Other legislation
- Amended by: East India Company and the Nabobs of the Carnatic Act 1810; East India Company and the Nabobs of the Carnatic Act 1812; East India Company and the Nabobs of the Carnatic Act 1817; East India Company and the Nabobs of the Carnatic Act 1819; East India Company and the Nabobs of the Carnatic Act 1822
- Repealed by: Statute Law (Repeals) Act 2008

Status: Repealed

Text of statute as originally enacted

East India Company and the Nabobs of the Carnatic Act 1810
- Act of Parliament
- Parliament of the United Kingdom
- Long title: An Act to continue until the Twenty fifth Day of March One thousand eight hundred and thirteen, the Powers of the Commissioners appointed in pursuance of an Act of the Forty sixth Year of His present Majesty, for enabling the Commissioners acting in pursuance of an Agreement between the East India Company and the private Creditors of the Nabobs of the Carnatic, the better to carry the same into Effect.
- Citation: 50 Geo. 3. c. cciii
- Territorial extent: United Kingdom

Dates
- Royal assent: 15 June 1810
- Commencement: 15 June 1810
- Expired: 25 March 1813 (Note: Section 1.)
- Repealed: 21 July 2008

Other legislation
- Amends: East India Company and the Nabobs of the Carnatic Act 1806
- Repealed by: Statute Law (Repeals) Act 2008

Status: Repealed

Text of statute as originally enacted

East India Company and the Nabobs of the Carnatic Act 1812
- Act of Parliament
- Parliament of the United Kingdom
- Long title: An Act for further continuing until the First Day of August One thousand eight hundred and sixteen, and from thence until the End of the then next Session of Parliament, the Powers of the Commissioners appointed in pursuance of an Act of the Forty sixth Year of His present Majesty, for enabling the Commissioners acting in pursuance of an Agreement between the East India Company and the private Creditors of the Nabobs of the Carnatic, to carry the same into Effect.
- Citation: 52 Geo. 3. c. clxxxviii
- Territorial extent: United Kingdom

Dates
- Royal assent: 9 July 1812
- Commencement: 9 July 1812
- Expired: 1 August 1816
- Repealed: 21 July 2008

Other legislation
- Amends: East India Company and the Nabobs of the Carnatic Act 1806
- Repealed by: Statute Law (Repeals) Act 2008

Status: Repealed

Text of statute as originally enacted

East India Company and the Nabobs of the Carnatic Act 1817
- Act of Parliament
- Parliament of the United Kingdom
- Long title: An Act for further continuing, until the First Day of August One thousand eight hundred and eighteen, and from thence to the End of the then next Session of Parliament, the Powers given by an Act of the Forty sixth Year of His present Majesty, for enabling the Commissioners acting in Execution of an Agreement made between the East India Company and the private Creditors of the Nabobs of the Carnatic, the better to carry the same into Effect.
- Citation: 57 Geo. 3. c. viii
- Territorial extent: United Kingdom

Dates
- Royal assent: 17 March 1817
- Commencement: 17 March 1817
- Expired: 1 August 1818
- Repealed: 21 July 2008

Other legislation
- Amends: East India Company and the Nabobs of the Carnatic Act 1806
- Repealed by: Statute Law (Repeals) Act 2008

Status: Repealed

Text of statute as originally enacted

East India Company and the Nabobs of the Carnatic Act 1819
- Act of Parliament
- Parliament of the United Kingdom
- Long title: An Act for further continuing, until the First Day of August One thousand eight hundred and twenty one, and from thence to the End of the then next Session of Parliament, the Powers granted by an Act of the Forty sixth Year of His present Majesty, for enabling the Commissioners acting in execution of an Agreement made between the East India Company and the private Creditors of the Nabobs of the Carnatic, the better to carry the same into effect.
- Citation: 59 Geo. 3. c. xxvi
- Territorial extent: United Kingdom

Dates
- Royal assent: 19 May 1819
- Commencement: 19 May 1819
- Expired: 1 August 1821
- Repealed: 21 July 2008

Other legislation
- Amends: East India Company and the Nabobs of the Carnatic Act 1806
- Repealed by: Statute Law (Repeals) Act 2008

Status: Repealed

Text of statute as originally enacted

East India Company and the Nabobs of the Carnatic Act 1822
- Act of Parliament
- Parliament of the United Kingdom
- Long title: An Act for further continuing, until the First Day of August One thousand eight hundred and twenty five, and from thence to the End of the then next Session of Parliament, the Powers granted by an Act of the Forty sixth Year of His late Majesty, for enabling the Commissioners acting in Execution of an Agreement made between the East India Company and the private Creditors of the Nabobs of the Carnatic, the better to carry the same into effect.
- Citation: 3 Geo. 4. c. xviii
- Territorial extent: United Kingdom

Dates
- Royal assent: 15 May 1822
- Commencement: 15 May 1822
- Expired: 1 August 1825
- Repealed: 21 July 2008

Other legislation
- Amends: East India Company and the Nabobs of the Carnatic Act 1806
- Repealed by: Statute Law (Repeals) Act 2008

Status: Repealed

Text of statute as originally enacted

Based on the terms of the treaty, the Nawab of Arcot (sometimes called the Nawab of the Carnatic) ceded all his lands to British rule, including the territory of the polygars. He was retained one-fifth of the revenues of the country, amounting to 12 lakhs p.a in exchange.

== See also ==
- Carnatic Wars
- Treaty of Pondicherry
- Treaty of Seringapatam

== Bibliography ==
- John Malcolm (1826). The Political History of India, from 1784 to 1823, Volume 1.
