= Saadatullah Khan II =

Nawab of the Carnatic from 1742 to 1744

Sa'adatullah Khan II
- Nawab

Nawab of the Carnatic
- Reign: 2 October 1742 – 4 July 1744
- Predecessor: Safdar Ali Khan
- Successor: Anwaruddin Khan
- Died: 4 July 1744; Arcot, Carnatic
Names
- Muhammad Sayyid Sa'adatullah Khan II
- Father: Safdar Ali Khan

Sa'adatullah Khan II (died 4 July 1744), also known as Muhammad Sayyid, was Nawab of Arcot, who was a younger son (heir apparent) of Safdar Ali Khan. He was murdered when he was an infant.

== Reign ==
After the assassination of Safdar Ali Khan in 1742, Murtaza Ali Khan claimed for himself the Nawabship of the Arcot (Carnatic), Chanda Sahib who was taken prisoner to Satara by Maratha leader Raghoji Bhonsle had managed to obtain his freedom after rigorous negotiations, also supported the claims of Murtaza Ali.

However, the British East India Company at Madras firmly supported Muhammad Sayyid and proclaimed him as the Nawab of Arcot. At the same time, Nizam ul Mulk Asaf Jah I came with a strong force and settled the claim in favor of Muhammad Sayyid. But as he was a minor, he placed Anwaruddin Khan as Regent, 28 March 1743. During this period, Richard Benyon, the Governor of Fort St. George obtained the Nawab's firman in 1743 granting the villages of Perambur, Sadiankuppam, Ernavore, Pudubakkam and Vepery.

=== Expedition against the Marathas ===
Outraged by the Maratha occupation of the territories of the Nawab of the Carnatic, Asaf Jah I led an expedition to liberate the Carnatic he was joined by Sadatullah Khan II and Anwaruddin Khan together they recaptured Arcot and initiated the Siege of Trichinopoly (1743), which lasted five months and forced the Marathas led by Murari Rao Ghorpade to evacuate the Carnatic.

== Assassination ==
Still an infant, Sa'adatullah Khan II was murdered in July 1744 at Arcot by Nawab Murtuza Ali Khan. With his death, the first dynasty of Nawabs of Arcot came to an end. In the ensuing power struggle, it was Anwaruddin Khan who was confirmed as Nawab of Arcot (the first of the second dynasty) by Nizam of Hyderabad, Asaf Jah I.

== Titles held ==
Preceded by Safdar Ali Khan	Nawab of Carnatic; 1742 –1744	Succeeded by Anwaruddin Khan

== See also ==
- Nawabs of Arcot
