= Masjid-o-Anwari =

Mosque in Chennai, Tamil Nadu, India

- அன்வரி மசூதி
- Location of the mosque in Chennai

Religion
- Affiliation: Islam
- Ecclesiastical or organizational status: Mosque
- Status: Active

Location
- Location: Triplicane, Chennai, Tamil Nadu
- Country: India
- Interactive map of Masjid-o-Anwari
- Coordinates: 13°03′46″N 80°16′24″E

Architecture
- Type: Mosque architecture
- Style: Mughal
- Founder: Anwaruddin Muhammed Khan
- Established: 18th century Carnatic Sultanate

The Masjid-o-Anwari (Tamil: அன்வரி மசூதி) is a mosque in the neighbourhood of Triplicane in Chennai, in the state of Tamil Nadu, India. It was constructed by Anwaruddin Muhammed Khan, Nawab of the Carnatic in the 18th century. Located in Big Street, the mosque was used as a congregational mosque until 1847.

== See also ==
- Islam in India
- List of mosques in India
