= Charles Godeheu =

Acting Governor General of Pondicherry

Charles Robert Godeheu de Zaimont was Acting Governor General of Pondicherry. He was the Commissioner of French army during Dupleix's reign.

== Important incidents ==
In 1754, Godeheu gave up with the English the Indian territories, especially Madras, which had been conquered in 1746 by Dupleix and left the French with the Deccan region. From 1751 Dupleix's star began to wane. Robert Clive, a discontented young British factor who had left the countinghouse for the field, seized the fort of Arcot, political capital of Karnataka, with 210 men in August 1751. This daring stroke had the hoped-for effect of diverting half of Chanda Sahib's army to its recovery. Clive's successful 50-day defense permitted Mohamed Ali Khan Walajan to procure allies from Tanjore and the Marathas. The French were worsted, and they were eventually forced to surrender in June 1752. Dupleix never recovered from this blow and was superseded in August 1754 by his director Godehou, who made an unfavourable settlement with the British. On 26 December 1754, he signed the Treaty of Pondicherry with Thomas Saunders, the English East India Company's resident at Madras, that forbade the British and French companies all political activity in India and the activity must be strictly commercial.

His intervention in French activity at that time left an unerasable scar on Dupleix's efforts and became the death blow for future expansion of the French Colonial Empire in India.

== See also ==
- Second Carnatic War

== Titles ==
Government offices
Preceded by Joseph François Dupleix	Governor-General of French India (Acting); 15 October 1754 – February 1755	Succeeded by Georges Duval de Leyrit
