= Siege of Trichinopoly (1741) =

1741 siege and capture of Trichinopoly by the Maratha Empire

- Part of Raghoji's Southern Campaign
Date	16 January 1741 – 26 March 1741
Location	Trichinopoly, Tamilnadu
Result	Maratha Empire victory
Territorial changes	Maratha army successfully captures Trichinopoly.

Belligerents
Maratha Empire • Nagpur state	Nawab of Carnatic

Commanders and leaders
Murari Rao; Raghoji I Dagduji Korde	Chanda Sahib (POW)

Strength
40,000 – 50,000	5,000 Sowar; 10,000 Sepoys

The siege of Trichinopoly took place in early 1741 during an extended series of conflicts between the Nawab of Arcot and the Maratha Empire for control over parts of what is now southern India. Raghuji Bhonsle's Maratha Army successfully starved out the town, compelling the surrender of Chanda Sahib on 26 March 1741.

== Background ==
During the initial invasion, the leader of Chanda Sahib Trichinopoly had stocked the city with grain, believing its ample supplies and strong fortifications would fend off the Marathas indefinitely. However, upon his return from Pondicherry, he sold the grain and even considered expanding his territories, sent his brother to Madura. This decision left Trichinopoly vulnerable and unaware of the imminent threat. Hearing of this opportunity, Raghuji, leading the Marathas, swiftly moved towards the Tiruchirappalli. Raghuji, anticipating this moment, saw it as the perfect opportunity to strike.

== Siege ==
Despite the unexpected turn of events, Chanda Sahib demonstrated unwavering resolve in defending himself. He pinned his hopes on his brother, Bara Sahib, and urgently requested his aid. Bara Sahib promptly responded, leading an army of three thousand cavalry and seven thousand infantry towards Trichinopoly. However, the Marathas, well-informed of Bara Sahib's movements, intercepted him with a superior force of 20,000, leading to a fierce battle where Bara Sahib was killed by Dagduji Korde also known as the executioner. The sudden loss of Bara Sahib on the battlefield dealt a heavy blow to his followers, who faltered in his absence, realizing the magnitude of his leadership. Chanda Sahib's resilience was put to the ultimate test as he found himself increasingly isolated and depleted of resources. Despite his determination, the harsh realities of prolonged siege and dwindling supplies forced him into a position of surrender. After enduring the relentless onslaught for over three months, he reluctantly opened the gates of Trichinapalli on March 21, accepting the hard terms offered by the Marathas.

== Aftermath ==
His surrender marked the end of the siege, and he was escorted as a prisoner to Satara, while the Marathas appointed Murari Rao as the new governor, consolidating their control over the region.
