= Nawab Murtuza Ali Khan =

Nawab Murtuza Ali Khan was the administrator of Vellore in Carnatic region which he inherited from his elder brother. He was brother-in-law and cousin of Safdar Ali Khan the Nawab of the Carnatic from 1740-1742. Muruza Ali Khan refused to pay the increased levies. He prepared a plot with his wife who was also the sister of Safdar Ali, and murdered Safdar Ali to declare himself the Nawab of the Carnatic. The declaration irritated other nobles and brought Saadatullah Khan II also known as (Nawab Saeed Muhammad Khan) the son of Safdar Ali, who was in Madras under the protection of British East India Company, to be recognized as the Nawab of the Carnatic. Muruza Ali Khan hired shooters and killed infant Sa'adatullah Khan II in 1744.

Muruza Ali Khan after assassinating Safdar Ali Khan declared himself as the Nawab of Arcot in November 1742 which was soon replaced by Sa'adatullah Khan II with the support of loyal court nobles and British East India Company.
