= Georges Duval de Leyrit =

Governor General in French India (1716–1764)

Georges Duval de Leyrit (7th August 1716 – 9th April 1764) was Governor General of Pondicherry between 1755 and 1758. He was preceded by Charles Godeheu and succeeded by as Arthur, comte de Lally-Tollendal.

Government offices
Preceded by Charles Godeheu, Le commissaire (Acting)	Governor-General of French India; February 1755–1758	Succeeded by Thomas Arthur, comte de Lally
