= Treaty of Pondicherry =

1754 treaty ending the Second Carnatic War

The Treaty of Pondicherry was signed in 1754 bringing an end to the Second Carnatic War. It was agreed and signed in the French settlement of Puducherry in French India. The favoured British candidate Mohamed Ali Khan Walajan was recognized as the Nawab of the Carnatic. Despite intending to be a lasting solution, a Third Carnatic War broke out just two years later in 1756.

== See also ==
- France in the Seven Years War
- Great Britain in the Seven Years' War

== Bibliography ==
- Keay, John. The Honourable Company: A History of the English East India Company. HarperCollins, 1993.
