= Saadatullah Khan I =

Nawab of Carnatic from 1710 to 1732

Sa'adatullah Khan I
- Nawab of Carnatic
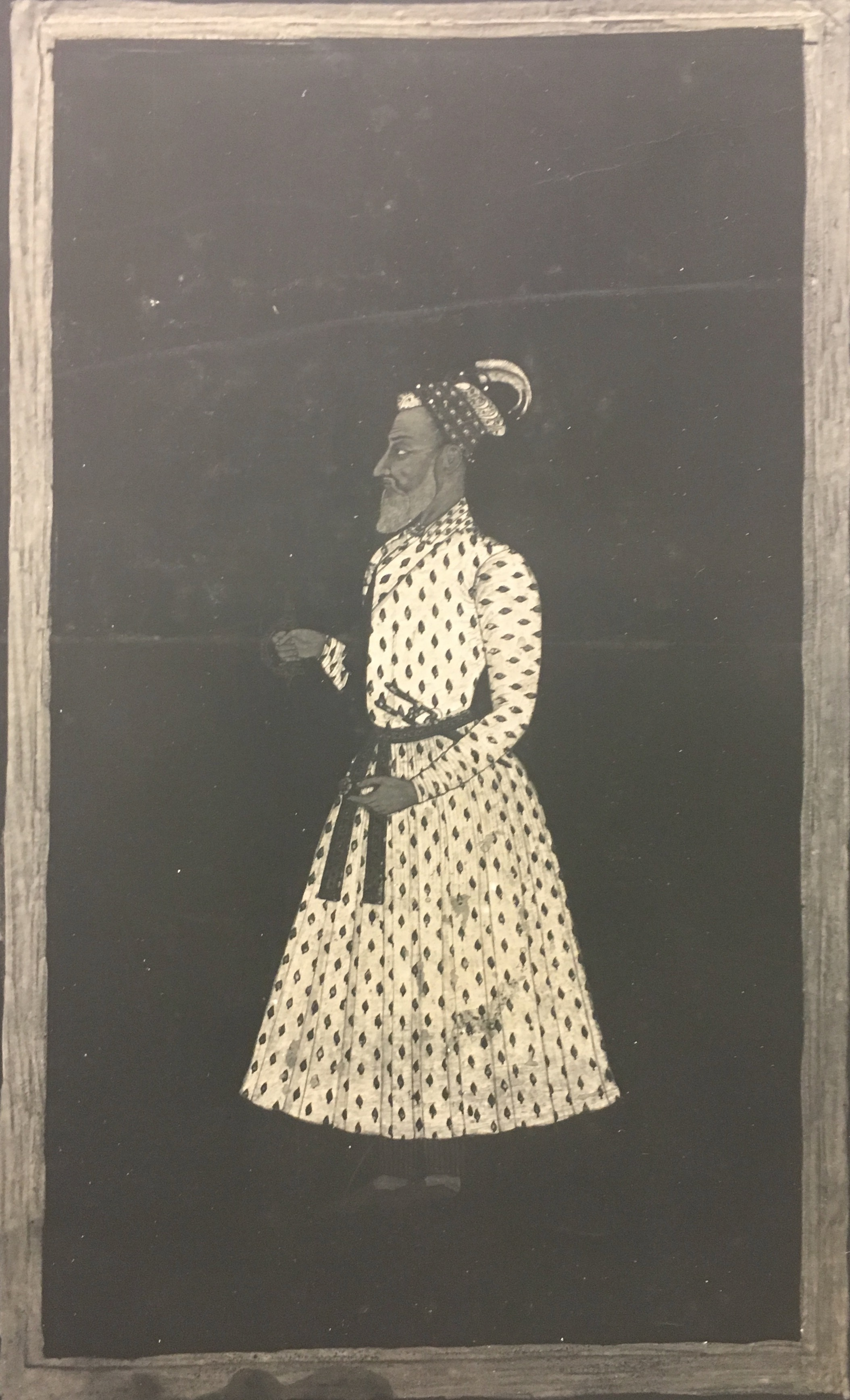
- Miniature of Nawab Saadatullah Khan
- Reign: 1710–1732
- Predecessor: Daud Khan Panni
- Successor: Dost Ali Khan
- Full name: Muhammad Sayyid Sa'adatullah Khan
- Died: 1732; Arcot
- Military career
- Allegiance: Mughal Empire
- Branch: Nawab of Arcot
- Rank: Nawab
- Conflicts: Mughal-Maratha Wars

Sa'adatullah Khan I or Sa'adatullah Khan was Nawab of Carnatic (r.1710–1732). He was an adventurer from Konkan in Maharashtra.

== Life ==
He was born to Muhammad Ali in Bijapur, to a respectable family of Nawayat Konkani Muslims, who inhabited the Konkan coast since the 14th century. Mohammed Sayyid was the last mughal governor who was appointed as Nawab of Carnatic with the title Saadatullah Khan I and moved his capital from Gingee to Arcot. Like his predecessors, he also enjoyed control over all the territories of the Emperor, in the South. He also carried his contribution wars to the gates of Srirangapatnam and collected "peshkash" or tribute from its rulers.

In 1711, he started demanding the five villages granted in 1708 to the East India Company on the basis of insufficient grants. The English resisted and even prepared for a war. Saadatullah Khan demanded Egmore, Tondiarpet and Purasawalkam also. But the matter was settled amicably by the good offices of Sunkurama and Rayasam Papaiya, the Company's Chief Merchants.

After the death of Aurungazeb, due to the inability of his successor, the control of Delhi became weak. Having no children, Saadatullah Khan adopted his brother Ghulam Ali Khan's son Dost Ali Khan as his own and nominated him as successor. He had obtained the private consent of the Mughal Emperor for this step even without communicating his desire to the Nizam of Deccan.

Though the Nizam claimed supremacy over the Nawab, his control became very weak and he could not prevent the office of the Nawab from becoming hereditary and so he wisely restricted himself to claiming the right of giving his formal approval to their appointment. Thus Saadatullah Khan became a senior and independent ruler of the Carnatic extending from the River Godicame on the North to the borders of Travancore on the South and enclosed between the Eastern Ghats and the Sea.

Governor Collect, obtained from him in 1717, the firman for Tiruvottiyur, Sattangadu, Kathiwakam, Vysarpady and Nungambakkam.

== Titles held ==
- Dewan under Nawab Daud Khan.

Preceded by Nawab Daud Khan	Nawab of Carnatic; 1710 –1732	Succeeded by Dost Ali Khan

== See also ==
- Nawabs of Arcot
