= Anwaruddin Khan =

Nawab of the Carnatic from 1744 to 1749

- Nawab

Nawab of the Carnatic
- Reign: 1744 – 3 August 1749
- Predecessor: Saadatullah Khan II
- Successor: Chanda Sahib; Muhammad Ali Khan Wallajah
- Full name: Muhammad Khan-i-Jahan Anwar rud-din Khan
- Born: Anwaruddin; 1672; Gopamau, Hardoi district, Awadh
- Died: 3 August 1749 (aged 76–77); Ambur, Carnatic
- Issue: Muhammad Ali Khan Wallajah
- Military career
- Allegiance: Carnatic Sultanate
- Branch: Nawab of Arcot
- Rank: Faujdar, Subedar, Ispahsalar, Wali
- Conflicts: Carnatic Wars

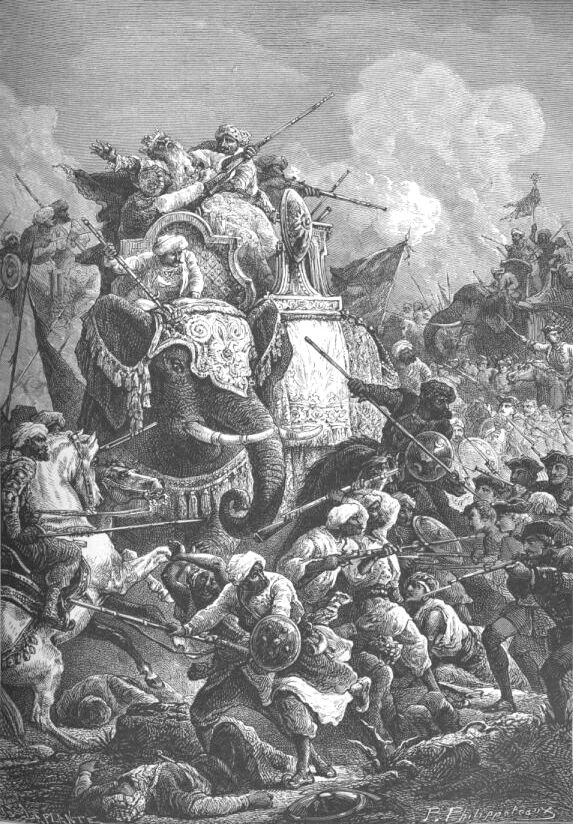
Death of the Nabob of the Carnatic in a battle against the French in 1749, by Paul Philippoteaux

Anwaruddin Khan (1672 – 3 August 1749), also known as Muhammad Anwaruddin, was the first Nawab of Arcot of the second dynasty. He belonged to a family of Qannauji Sheikhs. He was a major figure during the first two Carnatic Wars. He was also Subedar of Thatta from 1721–1733.

== Life ==
Nawab Anwaruddin Khan was born at Gopamau, a place in the Hardoi district of Awadh, in 1672. He was the son of Haji Muhammad Anwar ud-din Khan.

His official name at the height of his power was Amin us-Sultanat, Siraj ud-Daula, Nawab Haji Muhammad Jan-i-Jahan Anwar ud-din Khan Bahadur, Shahamat Jang, Subadar of the Carnatic.

He went to Delhi and enlisted in the imperial army and soon rose to a high position. He was the Yameen-us-Sultanat (right-hand man) of Asaf Jah I (a.k.a. Nizam-ul-Mulk, Mir Qmar-ud-din Khan Siddiqi), the first Nizam of Hyderabad.

He was also the Governor of Eloore and Rajamundry after 1725, Minister of Hyderabad, Faujdar of Korah and Jahanabad. He was granted the titles of Anwar ud-din Khan Bahadur by Emperor Aurangzeb 'Alamgir, Shahamat Jang by Emperor Shah Alam I, and Siraj ud-Daula by Emperor Muhammad Shah. He was sometimes Naib-wazir of the Empire, Faujdar of Srikakulam, Rajamahendravaram and Machlipatnam in 1724 and Nazim of Hyderabad from 1725–1743.

Muhammad Anwaruddin was appointed to Faujdar of Chicacole, Naib Subadar and regent of the Carnatic during the minority of Saadatullah Khan II on 28 March 1744. After the death of, Anwaruddin was appointed by the nizam as his representative and Nawab of the Carnatic in July 1744. Thus he became the founder of the Second Dynasty of the Nawab of the Carnatic. Anwaruddin maintaining a cordial relationship with the East India Company would come into conflict with the French after the death of Nizam-ul-Mulk in 1748.

In 1746, the French and the English fought to achieve supremacy over each other in India in the First Carnatic War. The Carnatic region became the arena of their action.

In 1746, the French captured the British post at Madras, and threatened but were unable to take that at Cuddalore. Muhammad Anwaruddin had warned both parties against attacking each other, but the French had disregarded his warning, and Joseph François Dupleix, the French governor-general, had placated him by offering him Madras.

However, after its capture, Dupleix rescinded the offer, and Muhammad Anwarudding sought to capture it from them. He sent an army of 10,000 men under his son Mahfuz Khan. They fought against the 300-man French force in the Battle of Adyar on the banks of the Adyar River, and lost. The decisive French victory demonstrated the effectiveness of well-trained European forces in combating poorly trained Indian troops.

Muhammad Anwaruddin received overtures for support from both from the English and the French, but supported the English. The French wanted to reduce the growing influence of the English in the Carnatic, so they supported Husayn Dost Khan, alias Chanda Sahib, as the rightful Nawab of the Carnatic against Muhammad Anwaruddin.

While the British and the French supported their respective candidates for the Nawabship, they also took sides in the conflict over succession to the Nizam of Hyderabad. After the death of Nizam-ul-Mulk in 1748, there arose a rivalry between Nasir Jung, his second son, and Muzaffar Jang, his grandson. Muzaffar Jang came to the south with a strong force and allied himself with Chanda Sahib and the French.

The aging Nawab Muhammad Anwaruddin, supported by the English, met the French army at Ambur on 3 August 1749 and was killed in the battle at the age of 77. He was mentioned as the oldest soldier to die on battlefield in "Ripley's Believe It or Not," although erroneously described as 107 years old at the time. Ripley stated that the Nawab died of gunshot wounds but that has not been independently verified.

== See also ==
- Carnatic Wars
- Nawab

Preceded by Saadatullah Khan II	Nawab of the Carnatic; July 1744 – 3 August 1749	Succeeded by Chanda Sahib (Recognised by the French)
Preceded by Saadatullah Khan II	Nawab of the Carnatic; July 1744 – 3 August 1749	Succeeded by Muhammad Ali Khan Wallajah (Recognised by the British)
