= Safdar Ali Khan =

Nawab of the Carnatic from 1740 to 1742

- Nawab

Nawab of the Carnatic
- Reign: 20 May 1740 – 2 October 1742
- Predecessor: Dost Ali Khan
- Successor: Saadatullah Khan II
- Died: 2 October 1742
- Father: Dost Ali Khan

Safdar Ali Khan (died 2 October 1742) was the son of Dost Ali Khan. After the death of his father on the battlefield at Ambur in 1740, he escaped to Vellore. In the same year, he was installed as the Nawab of Arcot by the Marathas.

There was total insecurity in the country during this period and Safdar Ali Khan took every possible measure to save his country and his family. He sent his son's wife to Madras for safety under the protection of the British, who securely lodged them in the Black Town.

Khan was murdered in 1742 by his brother-in-law Nawab Murtuza Ali Khan, who declared himself as the Nawab of Arcot.

== Titles held ==
Preceded by Dost Ali Khan	Nawab of Carnatic; 1740 –1742	Succeeded by Muhammed Saadatullah Khan II

== See also ==
- Nawabs of Arcot
