= Carnatic region =

Geographic region of southern India

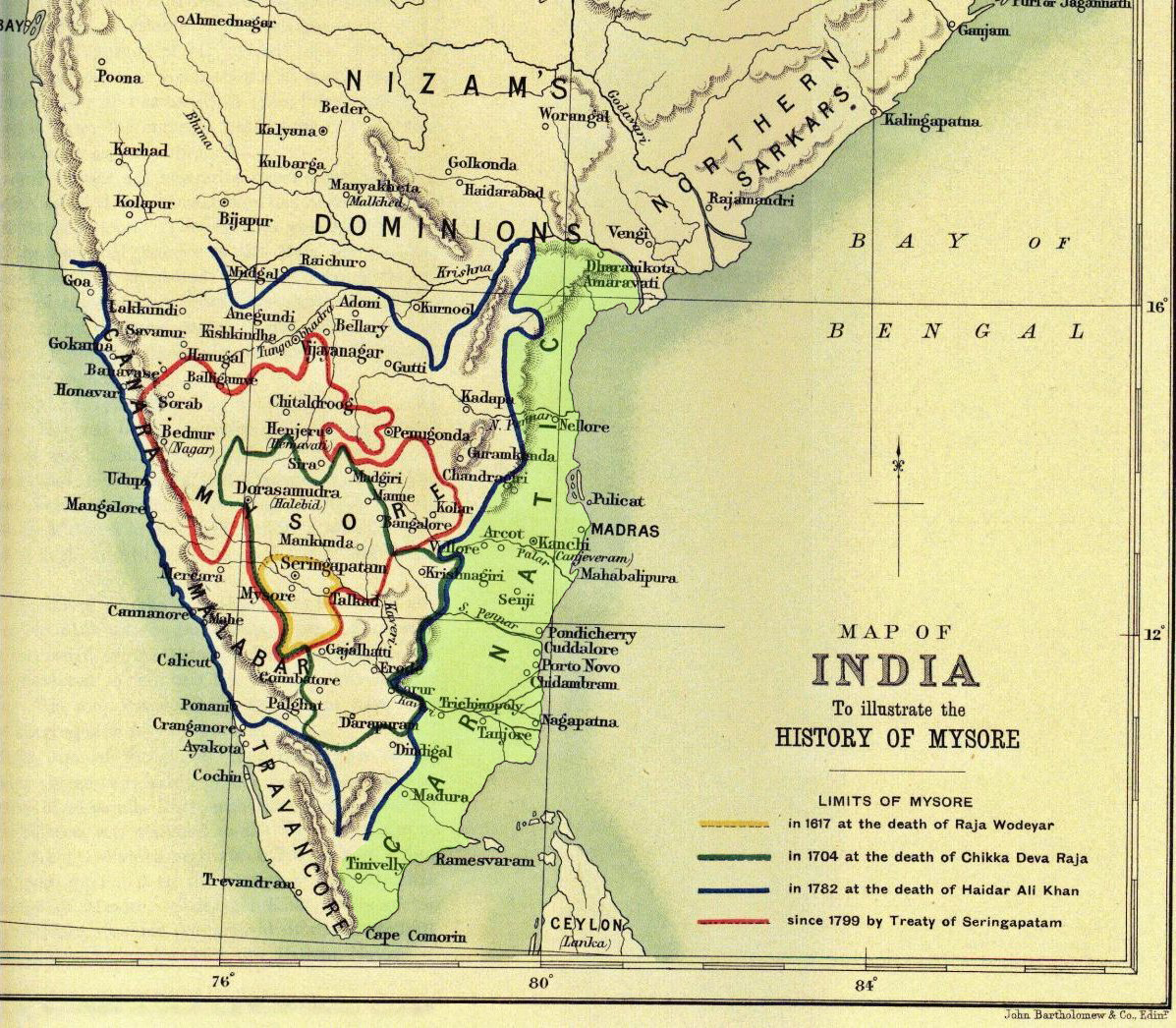
The Carnatic region shown on an 1897 map of India

The Carnatic region is the peninsular South Indian region between the Eastern Ghats and the Bay of Bengal, in the erstwhile Madras Presidency and in the modern Indian states of Tamil Nadu and southern coastal Andhra Pradesh. During the British era, demarcation was different and the region included current-day Karnataka and the whole region south of the Deccan.

== Etymology ==
A number of theories exist as to the derivation of the term Carnatic or Karnatic.

According to Bishop Robert Caldwell, in his Comparative Grammar of the Dravidian Languages, the term is derived from Kar, "black", and nadu, "country", i.e. "the black country", which refers to the black soil prevalent on the plateau of the Southern Deccan.

When the English settled on the East Coast, all South India, from the river Krishna to Cape Comorin, was under the rule of a Kanarese dynasty, reigning at Vijayanagara, and was known as the Karnataka Realm. Hence the name "Carnatic" has come to be popularly applied to the coastal plains south of Madras, although these are Tamil-speaking districts and quite outside the Kanarese country proper since the empire's territory covered most of the lands of the modern-day Indian states of Karnataka, Andhra Pradesh, Tamil Nadu, Goa, southern Kerala and some parts of Telangana and Maharashtra.

== Geography ==
The region that was named Carnatic or Karnatak (Kannada, Karnata, Karnatakadesa) by Europeans lies between the Eastern Ghats and the Coromandel Coast in the presidency of Madras.

The name is applicable only to the country of the Kanarese extending between the Eastern and Western Ghats, over an irregular area narrowing northwards, from Palghat in the south to Bidar in the north including Mysore. The extension of the name to the country south of the Karnata was probably due to the Mahommedan conquerors who in the 16th century overthrew the kingdom of Vijayanagara and extended the name which they used for the country north of the Ghats to that south of them. After this period the plain country of the south came to be called Karnata Payanghat, or "lowlands", as distinguished from Karnata Balaghat, or "highlands." The misapplication of the name Carnatic was carried by the British a step further. Officially, however, this name is no longer applied, "the Carnatic" having become a mere geographical term. Administratively the name Carnatic (or rather Karnatak) is now applied only to the Bombay portion of the original Karnata, viz. the districts of Belgaum, Dharwar, and Bijapur, part of North Kanara, and the native states of the Southern Mahratta agency and Kolhapur.

=== Sub-divisions ===
The region generally known to Europeans as the Carnatic, not a political or administrative division, is of great historical importance. It extended along the eastern coast about 600 kilometers in length, and between 50 and 100 kilometers in breadth. It was bounded on the north by the Guntur circar, and thence it stretched southward to Cape Comorin. It was divided into the Southern, Central, and Northern Carnatic. The region south of the river Coleroon, passing the town of Trichinopoly, was called the Southern Carnatic. The principal towns of this division were Tanjore, Trichinopoly, Madurai, Tranquebar, Negapatam and Tinnevelly. The Central Carnatic extended from the Coleroon river to the river Pennar; its chief towns being Madras, Pondicherry, Arcot, Vellore, Cuddalore, Pulicat, Nellore and a few other towns. The Northern Carnatic extended from the river Pennar to the northern limit of the country, and the chief town was Ongole. The Carnatic, as above defined, comprehended within its limits the maritime provinces of Nellore, Chingleput, South Arcot, Tanjore, Madurai and Tinnevelly, besides the inland districts of North Arcot and Trichinopoly. The population of this region consisted chiefly of Brahmanical Hindus. Muslims were thinly scattered over the country.

== History ==
In the earliest historical period, the area now known as the Carnatic was divided between the Pandya and Chola kingdoms, which with that of Chera dynasty or Kerala formed the three Tamil kingdoms of southern India. The Pandya kingdom practically coincided in extent with the districts of Madurai and Tinnevelly; that of the Cholas extended along the Coromandel coast from Nellore to Pudukottai, being bounded on the north by the Pennar River (Penner River) and on the south by the Southern Vellaru.

The government of the area was shared for centuries with these dynasties by numerous independent or semi-independent chiefs, evidence of whose perennial internecine conflicts is preserved in the multitudes of forts and fortresses, the deserted ruins of which crown almost all the elevated points. Despite this passion of the military classes for war, the Tamil civilization in the country was highly developed. This was sustained largely through the wealth of the country, famous in the earliest times as now for its pearl fisheries. Of this fishery, Korkai (the Greek Kólchoi), now a village on the Tambraparni River in Tinnevelly but once the Pandya capital, was the centre long before the Christian era.

In Pliny's day, owing to the silting up of the harbour, its glory had already decayed and the Pandya capital had been removed to Madurai, famous later as a centre of Tamil literature. The Chola kingdom, which four centuries before Christ had been recognized as independent by the Maurya king Ashoka, had for its chief port Kaviripaddinam at the mouth of the Kauvery, every vestige of which is now buried in the sand.

Tamil literature (particularly Iyal, in prose and poetry) contains in itself vast amounts of knowledge on Carnatic music. Starting from the earliest Tamil literature available today (around 200 BC), it is possible to trace the various forms of music (Isai) that had existed in different periods and the way it has transformed into today's Carnatic music, by absorbing techniques from other Indian forms of music.

For the first two centuries after Christ, a large sea-borne trade was carried on between the Roman Empire and the Tamil kingdoms; but after Caracalla's massacre at Alexandria in A.D. 215, this ceased, and with it all intercourse with Europe for centuries also. Henceforward, until the 9th century, the history of the country is illustrated only by occasional and broken lights.

The 4th century saw the rise of the Tamil Pallava power, which for some 400 years encroached on, without extinguishing, the other Tamil kingdoms. When in A.D. 640 the Chinese traveller Hsuan Tsang visited Kanchi (Conjevaram), the capital of the Pallava king, he learned that the kingdom of Chola (Chu-li-ya) embraced but a small territory, wild, and inhabited by a scanty and fierce population; in the Pandya kingdom (Malakuta), which was under Pallava suzerainty, literature was dead, Buddhism all but extinct, while Hinduism and the naked Jain saints divided the religious allegiance of the people, and the pearl fisheries continued to flourish.

The power of the Pallava kings was shaken by the victory of Vikramaditya Chalukya in AD 740, and shattered by Aditya Chola at the close of the 9th century. From this time onward, the inscriptional records are abundant. The Chola Dynasty, which in the 9th century had been weak, now revived, its power culminating in the victories of Rajaraja the Great, who defeated the Chalukyas after a four years war, and, about AD 994, forced the Pandya kings to become his tributaries. A magnificent temple at Tanjore, once his capital, preserves the records of his victories engraved upon its walls. His career of conquest was continued by his son Rajendra Choladeva I, self-styled Gangaikonda owing to his victorious advance to the Ganges, who succeeded to the throne in AD 1018. The ruins of the new capital which he built, called Gangaikonda Cholapuram, still stand in a desolate region of the Trichinopoly district. His successors continued the eternal wars with the Chalukyas and other dynasties, and the Chola power continued in the ascendant until the death of Kulottunga Chola III in 1278, when a disputed succession caused its downfall and gave the Pandyas the opportunity of gaining for a few years the upper hand in the south.

In 1310, however, the invasion under Malik Kafur overwhelmed the Hindu states of southern India in a common ruin. Though crushed, however, they were not extinguished; a period of anarchy followed, the struggle between the Chola kings and the Mussulmans issuing in the establishment at Kanchi of a usurping Hindu dynasty which ruled till the end of the 14th century, while in 1365 a branch of the Pandyas succeeded in re-establishing itself in part of the kingdom of Madurai, where it survived till 1623.

At the beginning of the 15th century, the whole country had come under the rule of the kings of Vijayanagar; but in the anarchy that followed the overthrow of the Vijayanagar empire by the Mussulmans in the 16th century, the Hindu viceroys (Nayaks) established in Madurai, Tanjore and Kanchi made themselves independent, only in their turn to become tributary to the kings of Golconda and Bijapur, who divided the Carnatic between them.

=== Muslim era ===
Towards the close of the 17th century, the northernmost part of The Carnatic region was reduced by the armies of Aurangzeb, who in 1692 appointed Zulfikar Ali, Nawab of the Carnatic, with his seat at Arcot. Meanwhile, the Marathas power had begun to develop; in 1677 Shivaji had suppressed the last remnants of the Vijayanagar power in Vellore, Gingee and Kurnool, while his brother Venkoji, who in 1674 had overthrown the Nayaks of Tanjavur, established in that city a dynasty which lasted for a century. The collapse of the Delhi power after the death of Aurangzeb produced further changes. The Nawab Saadet-Allah of Arcot (1710–1732) established his independence; his successor Dost Ali (1732–1740) conquered and annexed Madurai in 1736, and his successors were confirmed in their position as Nawabs of Northern Carnatic by the Nizam of Hyderabad after that potentate had established his power in South-Central India. After the death of Nawab Mahommed Anwar-ud-din (1744–1749), the succession was disputed between Mahommed Ali and Husein Dost. In this quarrel, the French and English, then competing for influence in the Carnatic, took opposite sides. The victory of the British established Mahommed Ali in power over northern Carnatic till his death in 1795. Meanwhile, however, the region had been exposed to other troubles. In 1741 Madurai, which the Nawab Dost Ali (1732–1740) had added to his dominions in 1736 after the demise of the Nayaks of Madurai, was conquered by the Marathas; and in 1743 Hyder Ali of Mysore overran and ravaged the central Carnatic. The latter was re-conquered by the British, to whom Madurai had fallen in 1758; and, finally, in 1801 all the possessions of the Nawab of Arcot were transferred to them by a treaty which stipulated that an annual revenue of several lakhs of pagodas should be reserved to the Nawab, and that the British should undertake to support a sufficient civil and military force for the protection of the country and the collection of the revenue. On the death of the Nawab in 1853, it was determined to put an end to the nominal sovereignty, a liberal establishment being provided for the family.

The rest of the Carnatic region, when first entered into by the British, was ruled by military chieftains called Poligars. In 1805, after the decisive defeat of the Poligars, the Poligar forts and military establishments were destroyed.

The Carnatic region was a place of Carnatic Wars between the Mughal Empire, Britain and France which ultimately led to British victory and the domination of the British Empire over India.

== See also ==
- Carnatic music
