= Carnatic wars =

18th-century wars between the French and the British

- Part of the Decline of the Mughal Empire, Anglo-French wars and the Anglo-Indian wars
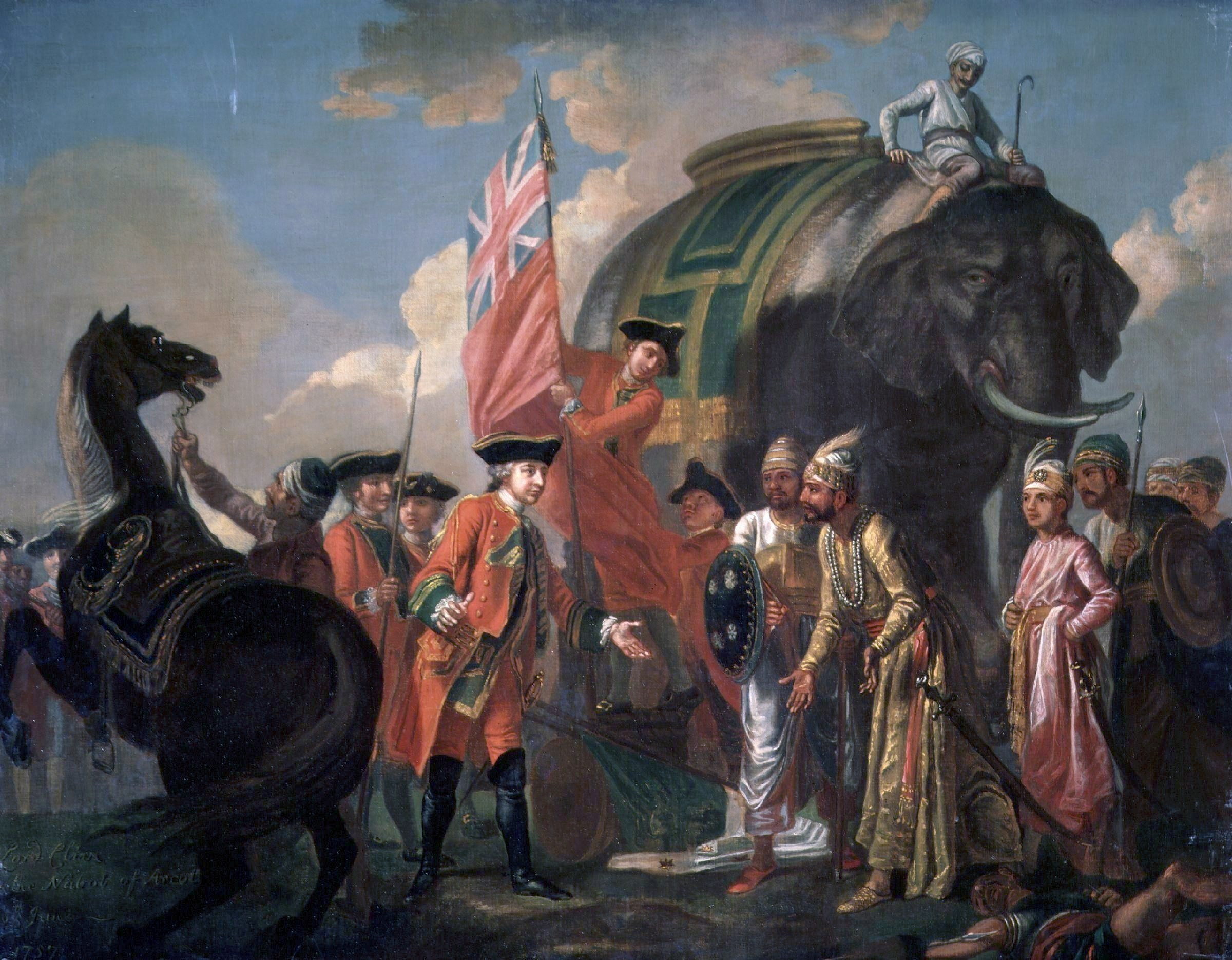
- Lord Clive meeting with Mir Jafar after the Battle of Plassey in 1757; Francis Hayman, c. 1762
Date	1744–1763
Location	Carnatic region
Result	British victory

Belligerents
Mughal Empire: Hyderabad; Carnatic; Bengal	Kingdom of France: French East India Company	Kingdom of Great Britain: British East India Company

Commanders and leaders
(Hyderabad State) Nasir Jung †; (Hyderabad State) Muzaffar Jung †; Chanda Sahib †; (Hyderabad State) Salabat Jung †; Siraj ud-Daulah (executed)	(Kingdom of France) Joseph François Dupleix; (Kingdom of France) Thomas Arthur, comte de Lally; (Kingdom of France) Charles Godeheu	(Kingdom of Great Britain) Robert Clive; (Kingdom of Great Britain) Eyre Coote

The Carnatic wars were a series of military conflicts in the middle of the 18th century in India's coastal Carnatic region, a dependency of Hyderabad State, India. The first Carnatic wars were fought between 1740 and 1748.

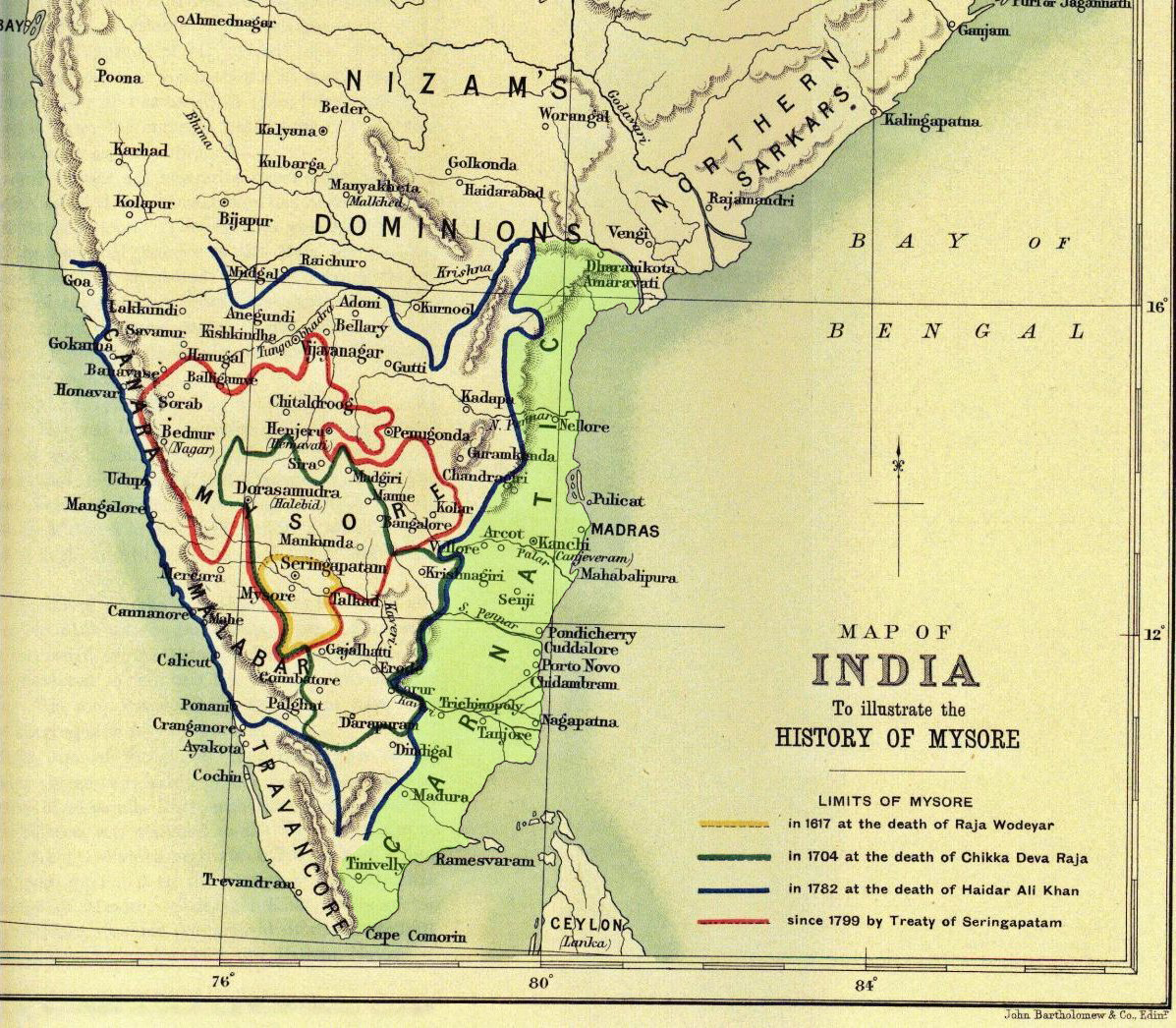
The Carnatic Region of what is now India

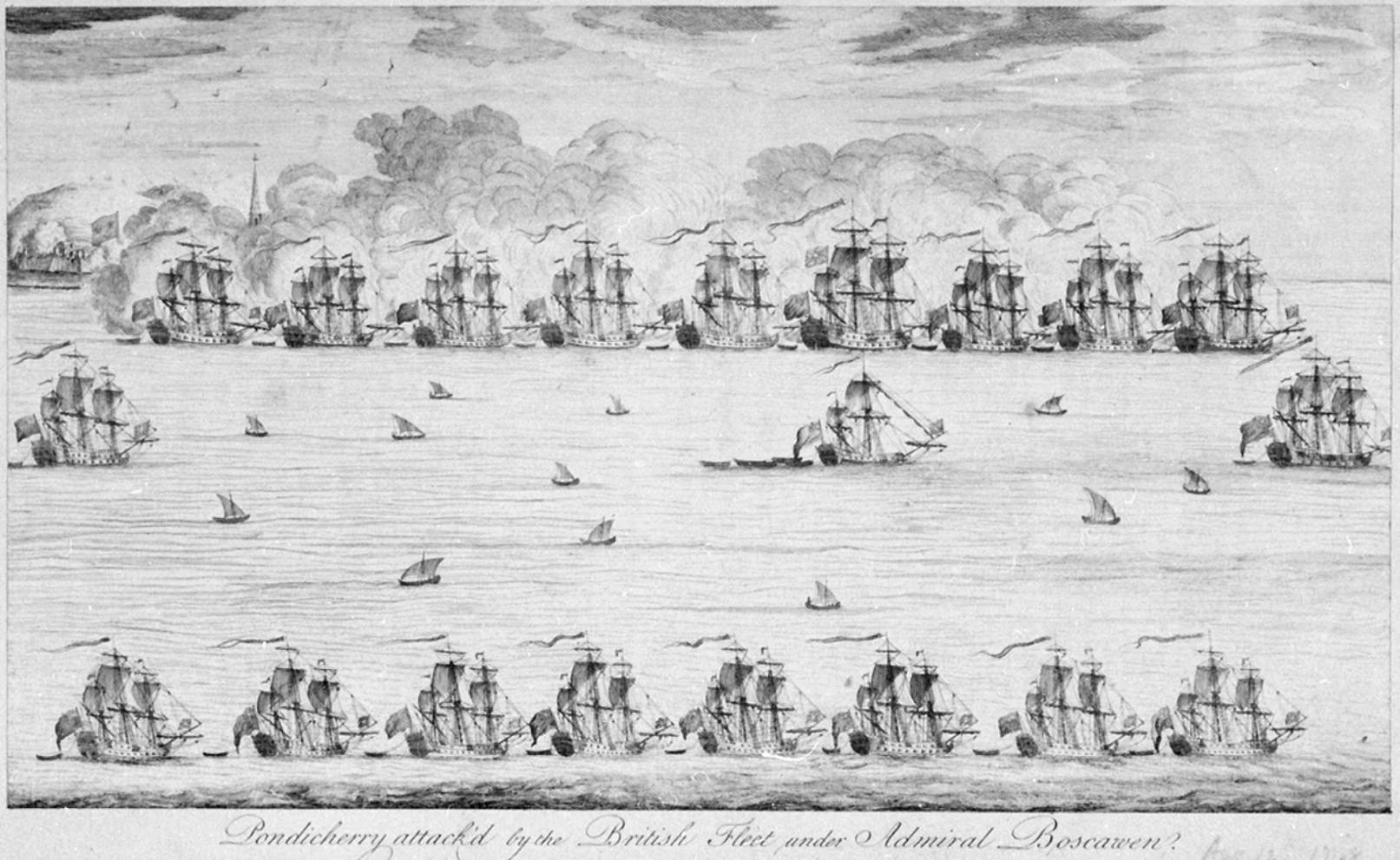
British Admiral Edward Boscawen besieged Pondicherry in the later months of 1748.

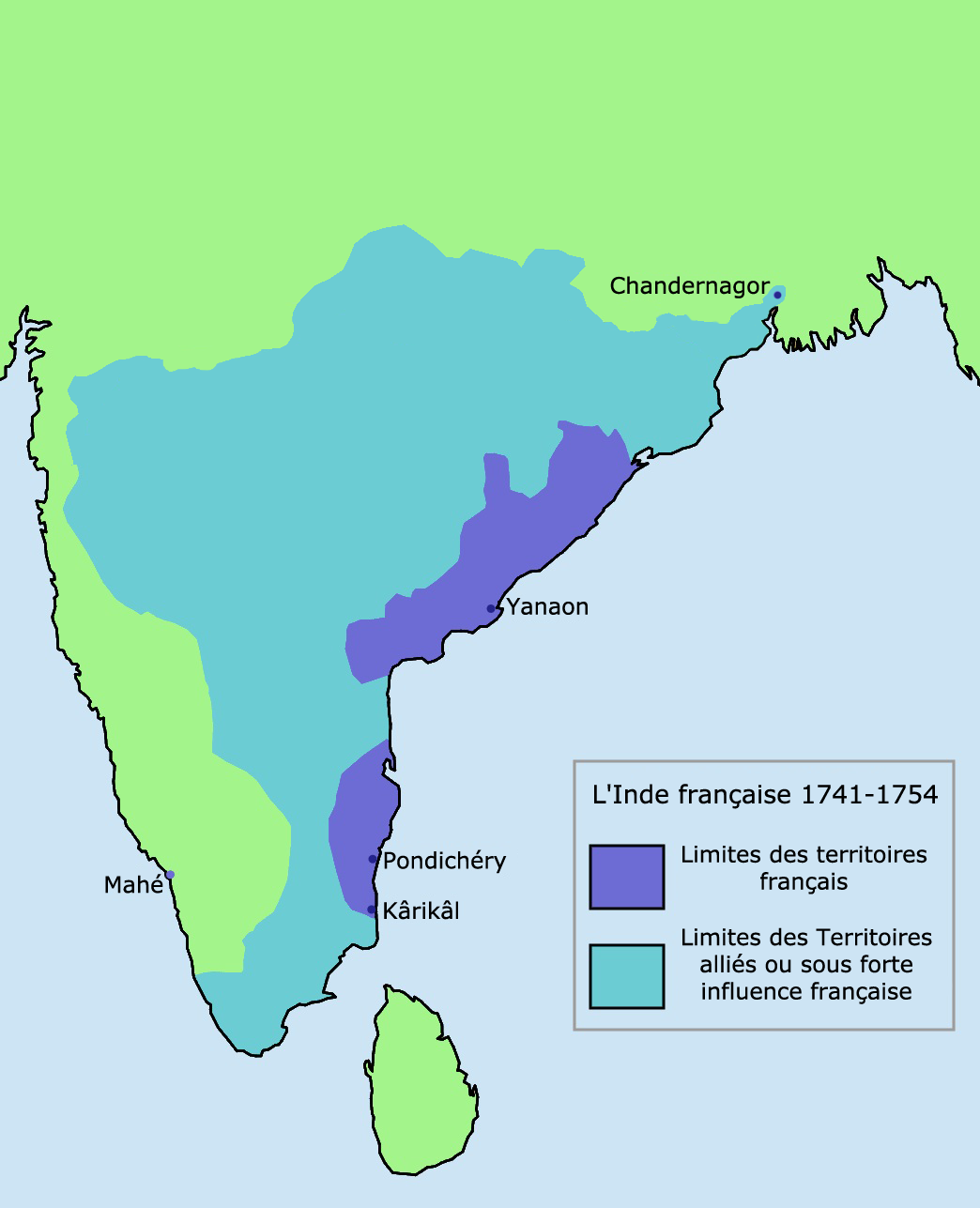
Map of French India at its peak between 1741 and 1754.

The conflicts involved numerous nominally independent rulers and their vassals, struggles for succession and territory, and furthermore included a diplomatic and military struggle between the French East India Company and the British East India Company. They were mainly fought within the territories of Mughal India with the assistance of various fragmented polities loyal to the "Great Moghul".

As a result of these military contests, the British East India Company established its dominance among the European trading companies within India. The French company was pushed to a corner and was confined primarily to Pondicherry. The East India Company's dominance eventually led to control by the British Company over most of India and eventually to the establishment of the British Raj.

== Background ==
The Mughal Emperor Aurangzeb died in March 1707. He was succeeded by Bahadur Shah I, but there was a general decline in central control over the empire during the tenure of Jahandar Shah and later emperors. Nizam-ul-Mulk established Hyderabad as an independent kingdom. A power struggle ensued after his death between his son, Nasir Jung, and his grandson, Muzaffar Jung, which soon involved foreign powers eager to expand their influence. France aided Muzaffar Jung while Britain aided Nasir Jung. Several erstwhile Mughal territories were autonomous such as the Carnatic, ruled by Nawab Dost Ali Khan, despite being under the legal purview of the Nizam of Hyderabad. French and British support soon became intertwined with the affairs of the Nawab. Dost Ali's death sparked a power struggle between his son-in-law Chanda Sahib, supported by the French, and Muhammad Ali, supported by the British.

One major instigator of the Carnatic wars was the Frenchman Joseph François Dupleix, who arrived in India in 1715, rising to become the French East India Company's governor in 1742. Dupleix sought to expand French influence in India, which was limited to a few trading outposts, the chief one being Pondicherry on the Coromandel Coast. Immediately upon his arrival in India, he organized Indian recruits under French officers for the first time, and engaged in intrigues with local rulers to expand French influence. However, he was met by the equally challenging and determined young officer from the British Army, Robert Clive.

"The Austrian War of Succession in 1740 and later the war in 1756 automatically led to a conflict in India...and British reverses during the American War of Independence (1775–1783) in the 1770s had an impact on events in India."

== First Carnatic War (1746–1748) ==
In 1740, the War of the Austrian Succession broke out in Europe. Great Britain was drawn into the war in 1744, opposed to France and its allies. The trading companies of both countries maintained cordial relations in India while their parent countries were bitter enemies on the European continent. Dodwell writes, "Such were the friendly relations between the English and the French that the French sent their goods and merchandise from Pondicherry to Madras for safe custody." Although French company officials were ordered to avoid conflict, British officials were not, and were furthermore notified that a Royal Navy fleet was en route. After the British initially captured a few French merchant ships, the French called for backup from as far afield as Isle de France (now Mauritius), beginning an escalation in naval forces in the area. In July 1746, French commander La Bourdonnais and British Admiral Edward Peyton fought an indecisive action off Negapatam, after which the British fleet withdrew to Bengal. On 21 September 1746, the French captured the British outpost at Madras. La Bourdonnais had promised to return Madras to the British, but Joseph François Dupleix withdrew that promise, and wanted to give Madras to Anwar-ud-din after the capture. The Nawab then sent a 10,000-man army to take Madras from the French but was decisively repulsed by a small French force in the Battle of Adyar. The French then made several attempts to capture the British Fort St. David at Cuddalore, but the timely arrivals of reinforcements halted these and eventually turned the tables on the French. British Admiral Edward Boscawen besieged Pondicherry in the later months of 1748, but lifted the siege with the advent of the monsoon rains in October.

With the termination of the War of the Austrian Succession in Europe, the First Carnatic War also came to an end. In the Treaty of Aix-la-Chapelle (1748), Madras was given back to the British in exchange for the French fortress of Louisbourg in North America, which the British had captured. The war was principally notable in India as the first military experience of Robert Clive, who was taken prisoner at Madras but managed to escape, and who then participated in the defence of Cuddalore and the siege of Pondicherry. The French retained their position as the protectors of nizams of Hyderabad.

== Second Carnatic War (1749–1754) ==
Though a state of war did not exist in Europe, the proxy war continued in India. On one side was Nasir Jung, the Nizam and his protege Muhammad Ali, supported by the British, and on the other was Chanda Sahib and Muzaffar Jung, supported by the French, vying to become the Nawab of Arcot. Muzaffar Jung and Chanda Sahib were able to capture Arcot while Nasir Jung's subsequent death allowed Muzaffar Jung to take control of Hyderabad. Muzaffar's reign was short as he was soon killed, and Salabat Jung became Nizam. In 1751, however, Robert Clive led British troops to capture Arcot, and successfully defend it. During the onslaught, the Pari royal house who had sided with the French fled from their fort at Durgam to Pondicherry. The war ended with the Treaty of Pondicherry, signed in 1754, which recognised Muhammad Ali Khan Walajah as the Nawab of the Carnatic. Charles Godeheu replaced Dupleix, who died in poverty back in France.

== Third Carnatic War (1757–1763) ==
The outbreak of the Seven Years' War in Europe in 1756 resulted in renewed conflict between French and British forces in India. In this time the French were facing many financial problems. The Third Carnatic War spread beyond southern India and into Bengal where British forces captured the French settlement of Chandernagore in 1757. However, the war was decided in the south, where the British successfully defended Madras, and Sir Eyre Coote decisively defeated the French, commanded by the Comte de Lally at the Battle of Wandiwash in 1760. After Wandiwash, Pondicherry fell to the British in 1761.

== Aftermath ==
The war concluded with the signing of the Treaty of Paris in 1763, which returned Chandernagore and Pondicherry to France, and allowed the French to have trading posts in India, but forbade French traders from administering them. The French agreed to support British client governments, thus ending French ambitions of an Indian empire and making the British the dominant foreign power in India.

== See also ==
- French India
- Salabat Jung
- Hyder Ali
- Anwaruddin Khan
