= Chanda Sahib =

Indian nobility

- Died: 12 June 1752
- Military career
- Allegiance: Mughal Empire
- Branch: Nawab of the Carnatic: Nawab of Tinnevelly; Nawab of Tanjore
- Rank: Nawab; Ispahsalar (formerly); Subahdar (formerly); Divan (formerly); Faujdar (formerly); Sipahi (formerly)
- Conflicts: Mughal-Maratha Wars; Carnatic Wars; Seven Years' War

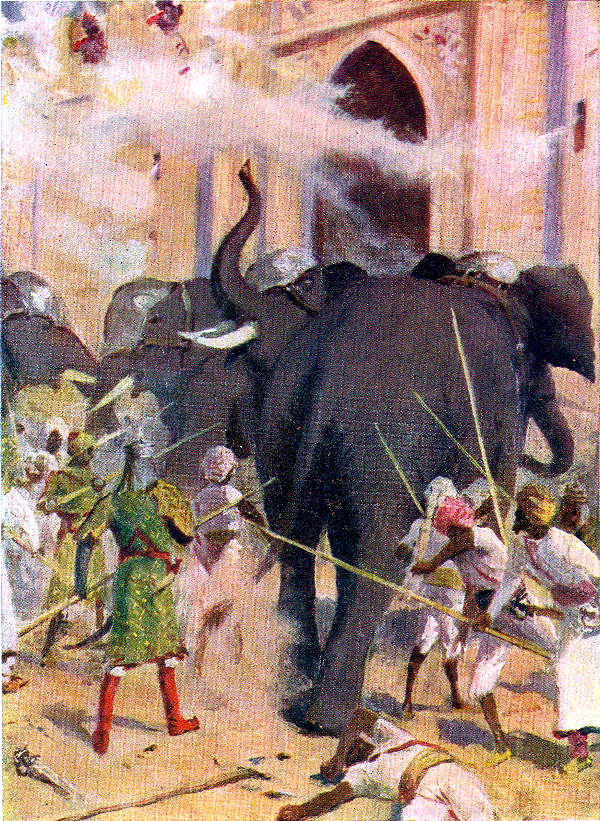
Siege of Arcot was a major battle fought between Robert Clive and the combined forces of the Carnatic Sultanate, Chanda Sahib, assisted by a small number of troops from the French East India Company.

Chanda Sahib (died 12 June 1752) was a subject of the Carnatic Sultanate between 1749 and 1752. He was the son-in-law of the Nawab of Carnatic Dost Ali Khan, under whom he was a Dewan. An ally of the French, he was initially supported by Joseph François Dupleix during the Carnatic Wars. He annexed the Madurai Nayaks and was declared Nawab, bringing Tanjore and Tinnevelly into the dominions of the Mughal Empire.

He was weakened by constant Marathi attacks and was defeated by British ally Muhammad Ali Khan Wallajah. After his forces were defeated by Robert Clive and the Maratha Empire, he attempted to recoup his losses but was beheaded during a mutiny of the Tanjore army.

== Early life ==
His birth name was Husayn Dost Khan.

Chanda Sahib sought the investiture of the Mughal Emperor Ahmad Shah Bahadur by declaring himself Nawab of Tinnevelly and gathered his own army of 3500 men and even received 400 French infantry from Dupleix

== Subduing Madurai ==
Vijaya Ranga Chokkanatha died in 1731 and was succeeded by his widow Meenakshi as Queen-Regent on behalf of a young boy she had adopted as her dead husband's heir. She only ruled a year or two before Vangaru Thirumala, the father of her adopted son, raised an insurrection against her. He said he had claims of his own to the throne of Madurai. At this juncture representatives of the Mughals appeared on the scene and took an important part in the struggle.

The local representative of the Mughal in present-day Andhra Pradesh was the Nawab of Arcot, Dost Ali Khan and an intermediate authority was held by the Nizam of Hyderabad, in theory both a subordinate of the emperor and the superior of the Nawab.

In 1734 — about the time, in fact, that Meenakshi and Vangaru Tirumala were fighting for the crown — the then-Nawab of Arcot sent an expedition to exact tribute and submission from the kingdoms of the Deep South. The leaders of this expedition were Dost Ali Khan's son, Safdar Ali Khan, and his nephew and confidential adviser, Chanda Sahib.

The invaders took Tanjore by storm and, leaving the stronghold of Trichinopoly untouched, reached Madurai, where they took part in the quarrel between Meenakshi and Vangaru Tirumala. The latter approached Safdar Ali Khan with an offer of 30,000 gold and silver coins if he would oust the Meenakshi in favour of himself. Unwilling to attack Trichinopoly, the Muslim prince contented himself with solemnly declaring Vangaru Tirumala king and took the 30,000 gold and silver coins. He then marched away, leaving Chanda Sahib to enforce his award as best he could. Meenakshi, alarmed at the turn affairs now had taken, had little difficulty in persuading that facile politician to accept her tribute of 100,000 silver and gold coins to declare her duly entitled to the throne.

Meenakshi required Chanda Sahib to swear on the Quran that he would adhere faithfully to his engagement. He was honorably admitted into the Trichinopoly fort and Vangaru Tirumala — apparently with the good will of the queen, who, did not seem to have wished him any harm and allowed him to venture into Madurai, to rule over that region and Tinnevelly.

== Career ==
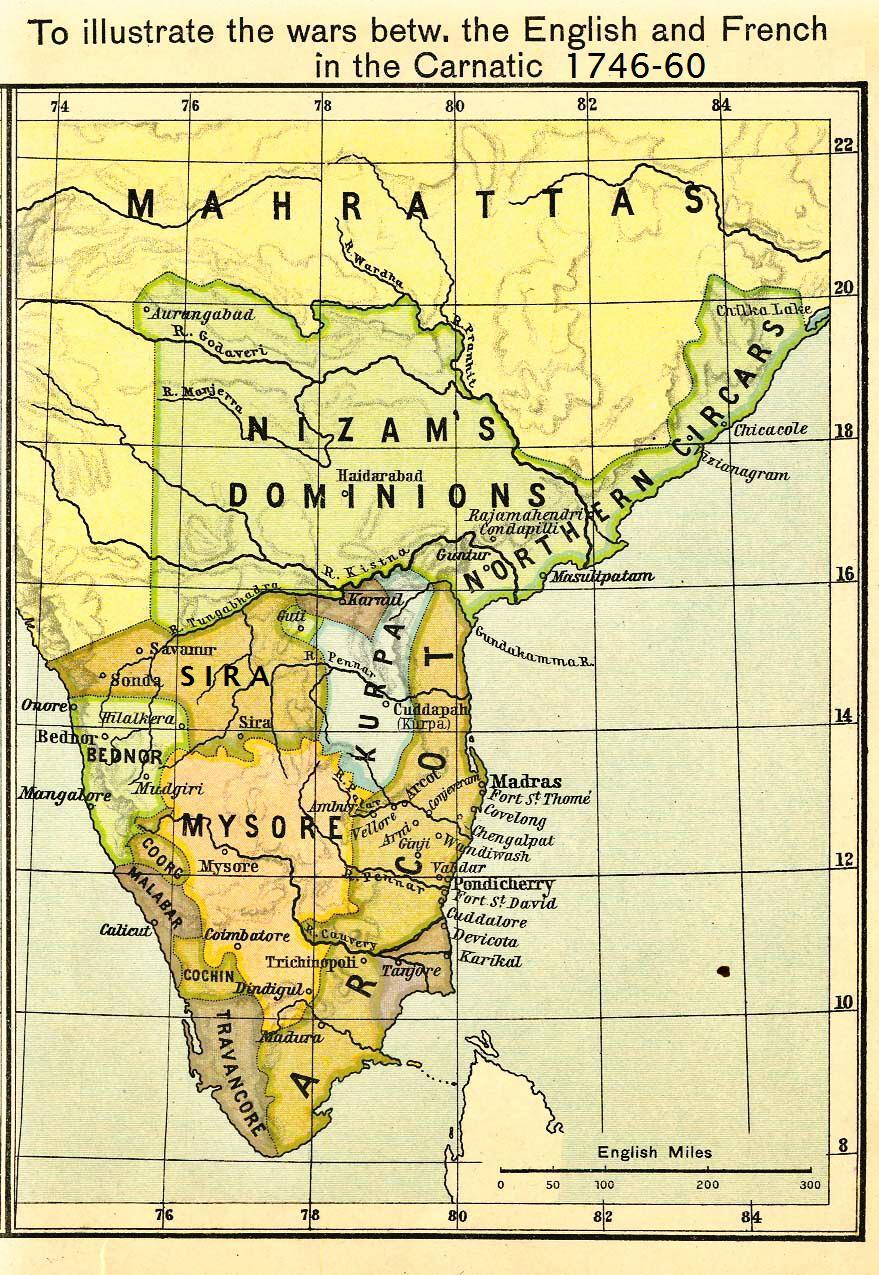
A map of the Carnatic containing the territory of Tanjore ruled by the Nawab of the Carnatic, Chanda Sahib.

Chanda Sahib accepted a large tributes for protection and left for Arcot. Two years later in 1736 he returned, again was admitted into the Trichinopoly fort, and proceeded to instate himself the Nawab of the Carnatic and received recognition by the Mughal Emperor Ahmad Shah Bahadur.

Chanda Sahib eventually marched against Vangaru Tirumala, who still ruled in the south, defeated him at Ammaya Nayakkanur and Dindigul, drove him to take refuge in Sivaganga, and occupied the southern provinces of the Madurai Nayak.

For a time, Chanda Sahib had his own way. His success was regarded with suspicion and even hostility by the Nawab of Arcot. But family loyalties prevented a rupture and Chanda Sahib was left undisturbed, while he strengthened the fortifications of Trichinopoly and appointed his two brothers as governors of the strongholds of Dindigul and Madurai. It was at this period that he subjugated the king of Tanjore, although he did not annex his territory, and he compelled them to cede Karaikal to the French. On 14 February 1739, Karaikal became a French colony.

=== Maratha interlude (1740–1743) ===
Unable to help themselves against the Europeans and the subjects of The Mogul, the king of Tanjore and Vangaru Tirumala called for the assistance of the Marathas of Satara in Maharashtra.

These Maratha of the Carnatic had their own grievance against the Muslims of Arcot, with whom Chanda Sahib still was identified, because of long-delayed payment of the chouth, or one-fourth of their revenues, which they had promised in return for the withdrawal of the Marathas from their country and the discontinuation of their incursions. These Marathas of Tanjore also were encouraged to attempt reprisals by the Nizam of Hyderabad, who — jealous of the increasing power of the Nawab and careless of the loyalty due to co-religionists — gladly would have seen his dangerous subordinate brought to the ground.

Early in 1740 the Marathas appeared in the south with a vast army, and defeated and killed Dost Ali Khan in the pass of Damalcheruvu, now in Chittoor district. Then they came to an understanding with his son, Safdar Ali Khan, recognised him as Nawab; in return, Khan accepted Maratha suzerainty and undertook to pay Marathas, an indemnity of 40 lakh rupees and a regular chauth.

With the Nawab of Arcot greatly weakened Chanda Sahib was captured and imprisoned by the Marathas in the siege of Tiruchirappalli (1741) led by general Raghuji Bhonsle under the orders of Chhattrapati Shahu.

In 1741, the Travancore-Dutch War broke out. During this conflict it was the policy of the subjects of the Mogul to support European mercantile presence in the Indian subcontinent.

== Nawab of the Carnatic ==
=== The Second Carnatic War (1749–1754) ===
After the death of the Nizam of Hyderabad, a civil war for succession broke out in south between Nasir Jung and Muzaffar Jung. Also, Chanda Sahib began to conspire against the Nawab Anwaruddin Muhammed Khan in Carnatic. This led to the Second Carnatic War.

=== Defeat at Arcot ===
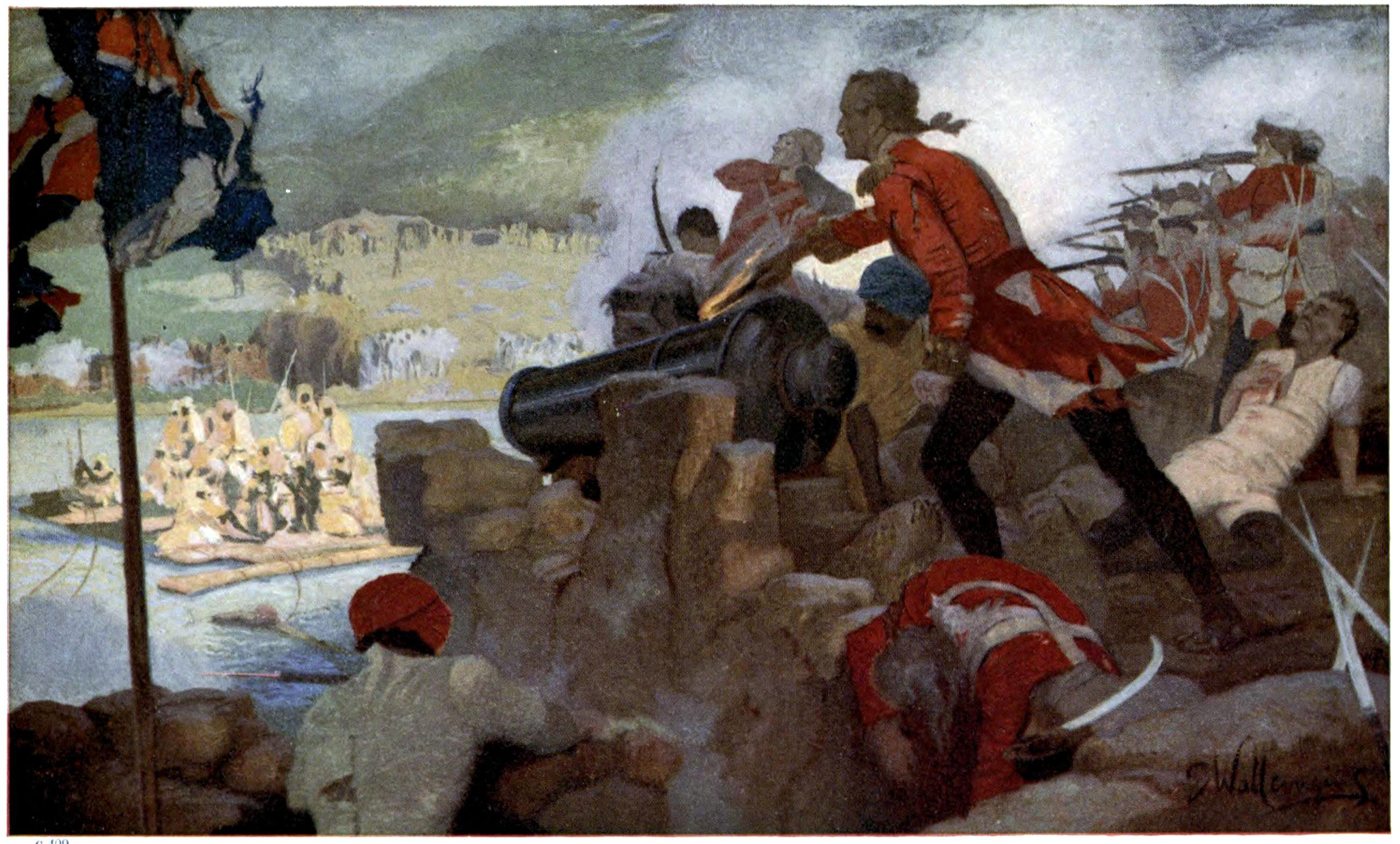
Clive at the siege of Arcot (1751)

In 1751, there was an ongoing scuffle between Mohamed Ali Khan Walajan, (who was the son of the previous Nawab of Arcot, Anwaruddin Muhammed Khan and hence the rightful claimant) and Chanda Sahib. Dupleix sided with Chanda Sahib and Muzaffar Jung to bring them into power in their respective states. But soon the British intervened. To offset the French influence, they began to support Nasir Jung and Muhammad Ali Khan Wallajah. Chanda Sahib initially succeeded and became the Nawab, forcing Wallajah to escape to the rock-fort in Tiruchirapalli.

=== Defeat at Trichinopoly ===
Chanda Sahib followed and with the help of the French, led the siege of Tiruchirappalli (1751–1752). Wallajah and the British force supporting him were in a grim position. A small British force of 300 soldiers made a diversionary attack on Arcot to draw Chanda Sahib's army away from Trichy. Chanda Sahib dispatched a 10,000 strong force under his son Raza Sahib to retake Arcot. Raza Sahib was aided by the Nellore Army and Muhammed Yusuf Khan may have been in this force as a Subedar. There he was defeated by a British force, of mostly enlisted Indians.

== Death ==
At Arcot and then Kaveripakkam (Tirukattupalli/koviladi), Chanda Sahib's son was defeated. Later he was killed by the British.

After this Chanda Sahib escaped to what was probably his hometown at Tanjore, only to be captured by the Maratha army of Tanjore. He was beheaded by the Maratha Tanjore Raja, Pratap Singh of Thanjavur.

The British quickly installed Wallajah as the Nawab of Arcot in 1754, and most of Chanda Sahib's native forces defected to the British.

== Titles held ==
Preceded by Anwaruddin Muhammed Khan	De facto Nawab of Carnatic (Recognised by the French); 1749–1752	Succeeded by Muhammad Ali Khan Wallajah

== See also ==
- Madurai Nayaks
- Marudha Nayakam
- Hyder Ali
- Robert Clive
- Carnatic region
- Nawab of Carnatic
- Raza Sahib

== External Articles ==
- Complete information about Nawabs of Arcot
- Refer the article named Initial Contacts with the British
