= Dost Ali Khan =

Nawab of the Carnatic from 1732 to 1740

- Nawab

Nawab of the Carnatic
- Reign: 1732 – 20 May 1740
- Predecessor: Saadatullah Khan I
- Successor: Safdar Ali Khan
- Died: 20 May 1740; Ambur
- Issue: Safdar Ali Khan
- Military career
- Allegiance: Mughal Empire
- Branch: Nawab of Arcot
- Rank: Nawab
- Conflicts: See list: Mughal-Maratha Wars; Battle of Damalcherry Pass †

Ali Dost Khan (died 20 May 1740), often referred to as Dost Ali Khan, was the Nawab of the Carnatic from 1732 to 1740. He was the son of Ghulam Ali Khan, brother of the Nawab Saadatullah Khan. His childless uncle adopted him as heir, and he succeeded his uncle in 1732, he successfully gained the investiture and an official Firman by the Mughal Emperor Muhammad Shah.

Ali Dost Khan was killed on 20 May 1740 in the Battle of Damalcherry with Raghoji I Bhonsle of the Maratha Empire.

== Titles held ==
Preceded by Muhammed Saadatullah Khan I	Nawab of the Carnatic; 1732 –20 May 1740	Succeeded by Safdar Ali Khan

== See also ==
- Carnatic Wars
