= Carnatic Sultanate =

State in southern India from 1692 to 1855

Coordinates: 24.18°N 88.27°E

Carnatic State Carnatic Sultanate
- 1692–1855
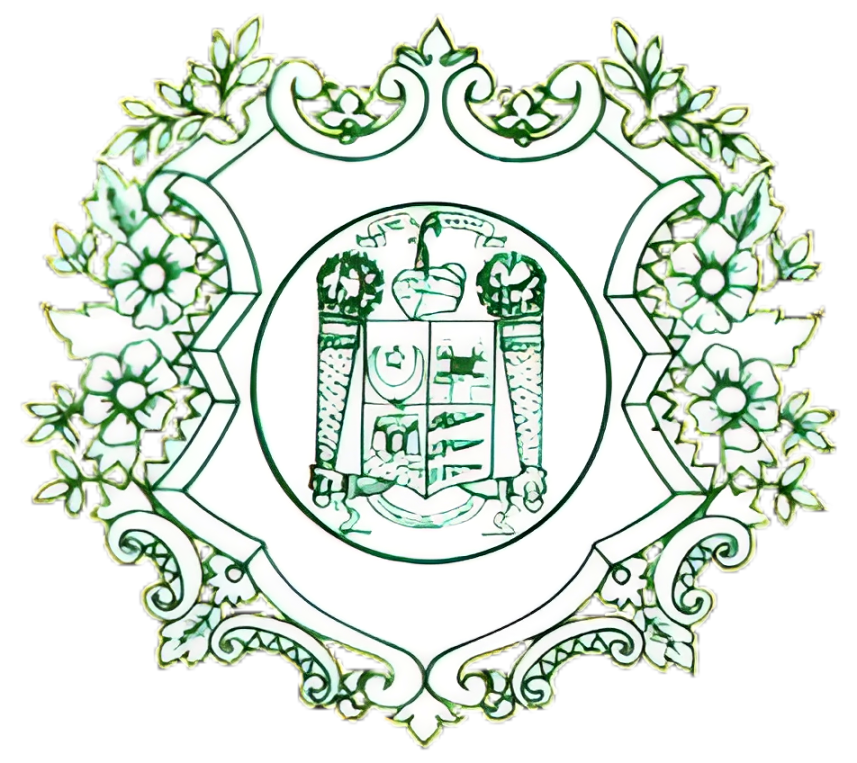
- Flag Coat of arms

- Carnatic (southeast coast), on the Bay of Bengal
- Status: Subah of the Mughal Empire (1692–1710); Independent state (1710–1801); Princely State under the paramountcy of the British East India Company (1801–1855)
- Capital: Gingee (1692–1710), Arcot (1710–1768), Chepauk (1768–1855)
- Official languages: Persian, Tamil, Urdu
- Religion: Islam (official), Hinduism, Jainism, Christianity
- Government: Monarchy
- Nawab
  - 1692–1703 (first): Zulfiqar Khan Nusrat Jung
  - 1710–1732 (first independent): Saadatullah Khan I
  - 1824–1855 (last): Ghulam Muhammad Ghouse Khan
- Historical era: Mughal rule in India; Maratha Empire; Company rule in India
  - Zulfiqar Khan appointed governor: 1692
  - Siege of Arcot: 23 September – 14 November 1751
  - Carnatic Treaty: 26 July 1801
  - Disestablished: 1855
Preceded by
Madurai Nayak
Maratha Confederacy
Mughal Empire
Succeeded by
Company Raj
- Today part of: India

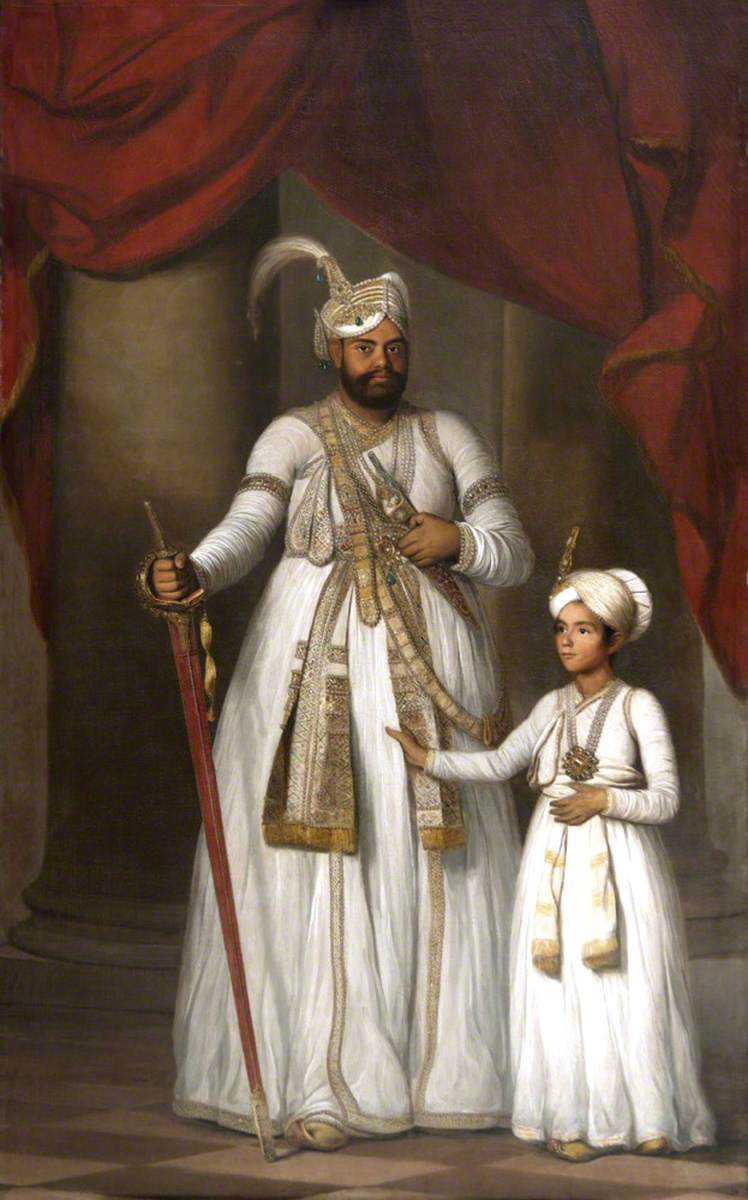
Nawab of Carnatic Azim-ud-Daula on the left, signed the Carnatic Treaty ceding tax rights to the British.

The Carnatic Sultanate (Note: Persian: Salṭanat-i-Karnātak; Tamil: Aṟkāḍu Navāp; Urdu: Saltanat-e-Karnāṭak), also known as Carnatic State or Arcot State, was a kingdom in southern India between about 1690 and 1855, ruled by a Muslim nawab under the legal purview of the Nizam of Hyderabad, until their demise. They initially had their capital at Arcot in the present-day Indian state of Tamil Nadu. Their rule is an important period in the history of the Carnatic and Coromandel Coast regions, in which the Mughal Empire gave way to the rising influence of the Maratha India, and later the emergence of the British India.

== Borders ==
The old province, known as the Carnatic, in which Madras (Chennai) was situated, extended from the Krishna River to the Kaveri River, and was bounded on the West by Mysore kingdom and Dindigul, (which formed part of the Sultanate of Mysore). The Northern portion was known as the 'Mughal Carnatic', the Southern the 'Maratha Carnatic' with the Maratha fortresses of Gingee and Ranjankudi. Carnatic thus was the name commonly given to the region of Southern India that stretches from the East Godavari of Andhra Pradesh in the north to the Maratha fort of Ranjangudi in the south (including the Kaveri River delta), and Coromandal Coast in the east to Western Ghats in the west.

== History ==
With the decline of Vijayanagara Empire in 1646, the Nayakas of Madurai, Tanjore and Kanchi made themselves independent. However, they quickly became tributaries to the kings of Golconda and Bijapur, who divided the Carnatic between them. Mughal Emperor Aurangzeb in 1692 appointed Zulfiqar Khan as the first subahdar of the Carnatic with his seat at Arcot as a reward for his victory over the Marathas led by Rajaram I.

With the decline of the Mughal empire, the Carnatic subah became independent as the Carnatic Sultanate, which controlled a vast territory south of the Krishna River. The Nawab Saadatullah Khan I moved his court from Gingee to Arcot. His successor Dost Ali Khan conquered and annexed Madurai in 1736.

In 1740, the Maratha forces descended on Arcot. They attacked the Nawab, Dost Ali Khan, in the pass of Damalcherry. In the war that followed, Dost Ali, one of his sons Hasan Ali, and a number of prominent persons lost their lives. This initial success at once enhanced Maratha prestige in the south. From Damalcherry, the Marathas proceeded to Arcot, which surrendered to them without much resistance. Chanda Sahib and his son were arrested and sent to Nagpur.

Muhammad Ali Khan Wallajah became the ruler in 1749, however he was not officially crowned until 1752, and he was only recognised as an independent ruler by the Emperor of Delhi in 1765.

The growing influences of the English and the French and their colonial wars had a huge impact on the Carnatic. Wallajah supported the English against the French and Hyder Ali, placing him heavily in debt. As a result, he had to surrender much of his territory to the East India Company. Paul Benfield, an English businessman, made major loans to the Nawab for the purpose of enabling him, who, with the aid of the English, had invaded and conquered the Maratha state of Tanjore, to satisfy some claims of the Dutch at Tranquebar on territories of the Rajah of Tanjore.

The thirteenth Nawab, Ghulam Muhammad Ghouse Khan, died, and the British annexed the Carnatic Nawabdom, applying the doctrine of lapse. Ghouse Khan's uncle Azim Jah was created the first Prince of Arcot (Amir-e-Arcot) in 1867 by Queen Victoria, and was given a tax free-pension in perpetuity.

== List of rulers ==
S.No.	Name	Reign began	Reign ended	Notes
Subedar of the Carnatic
1	Zulfiqar Khan Nusrat Jung	1692	1703	Son of Asad Khan, a renowned nobleman in the court of Emperor Aurangzeb
2	Daud Khan Panni	1703	1710	Before he was made Nawab, the Emperor Aurangazeb appointed him as a leading commander of the Mughal Army.
3	Sa'adatullah Khan I	1710	1732	He was the last Mughal governor who was appointed as Nawab of Carnatic. Belonging to a Navaiyit family, he had no children and so he adopted his brother Ghulam Ali Khan's son Dost Ali Khan as his own and nominated him as successor.
Nawab of the Carnatic
4	Sa'adatullah Khan I	1710	1732	He was the last Mughal governor who was appointed as Nawab of Carnatic. Having no children, he adopted his brother Ghulam Ali Khan's son Dost Ali Khan as his own and nominated him as successor.
5	Dost Ali Khan	1732	1740	Nephew of Sa'adatullah Khan I
6	Safdar Ali Khan	1740	1742	Son of Dost Ali Khan
7	Nawab Muruza Ali Khan	November 1742	December 1742	Cousin and Brother-in-Law of Safdar Ali Khan
8	Sa'adatullah Khan II	1742	1744	Son of Safdar Ali Khan. He was murdered in July 1744 at Arcot. So, with him, the first dynasty of the Nawabs of Arcot came to an end.
9	Anwaruddin Khan	1744	3 August 1749	He was the 1st Nawab of Arcot of the second dynasty. He was of Qannauji Sheikh origin.
10	Chanda Shahib	1749	1752	Son-in-law of the Dost Ali Khan, under whom he worked as a Dewan. Supported the French in Carnatic Wars.
11	Muhammad Ali Khan Wala-Jah	3 August 1749	16 October 1795	Son of Anwaruddin Khan. Supported the British in Carnatic Wars. Moved the capital from Arcot to Chepauk
12	Umdat ul-Umara	1795	1801	Son of Muhammad Ali Khan Wala-Jah
13	Azim-ud-Daula	1801	1819	Signed the Carnatic Treaty, ceding tax rights to the British; Nephew of Umdat ul-Umara
14	Azam Jah	1819	1825	Son of Azim-ud-Daula
15	Ghulam Muhammad Ghouse Khan	1825	1855	Son of Azam Jah. He died in 1855 at the age of 31. He did not leave behind any male heir.

=== Prince of Arcot ===
Prince of Arcot
Lineage
Amir	Reign	Notes
Azim Jah	1867–1874	younger son of Azim-ud-Daula The Chepauk Palace, the official residence of the princes of the Carnatic had been taken over by the British in 1859. He constructed a new residence, the Amir Mahal, in Royapettah.
Sir Zahir-ud-Daula Bahadur	1874–1879	Son of Azim Jah
Intizam-ul-Mulk Muazzal ud-Daula Bahadur	1879–1889	younger son of Azim Jah
Sir Muhammad Munawar Khan Bahadur	1889–1903	nephew of Intizam-ul-Mulk
Sir Ghulam Muhammad Ali Khan Bahadur	1903–1952	Son of Muhammad Munawar Khan
Ghulam Mohiuddin Khan Bahadur	1952–1969	younger son of Muhammad Munawar Khan
Ghulam Mohammed Abdul Khader	1969–1993	Son of Ghulam Mohiuddin Khan
Muhammed Abdul Ali	1993–	Son of Ghulam Mohammed Abdul Khader

== Gallery ==
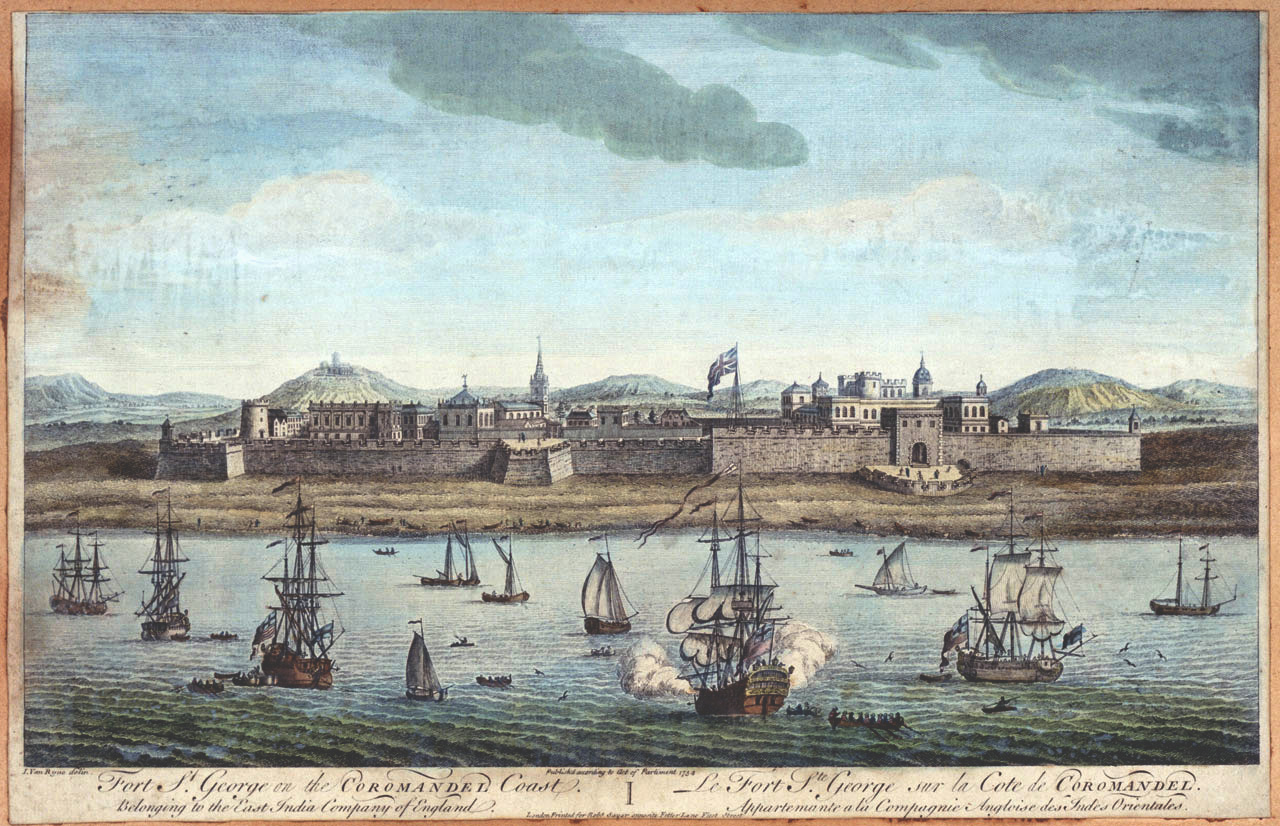
In the year 1702, Nawab Daud Khan, the Mughal Empire's local Subedar of the Carnatic, besieged and blockaded Fort St. George for more than three months, the governor of the fort, Thomas Pitt, was instructed by the British East India Company to vie for peace

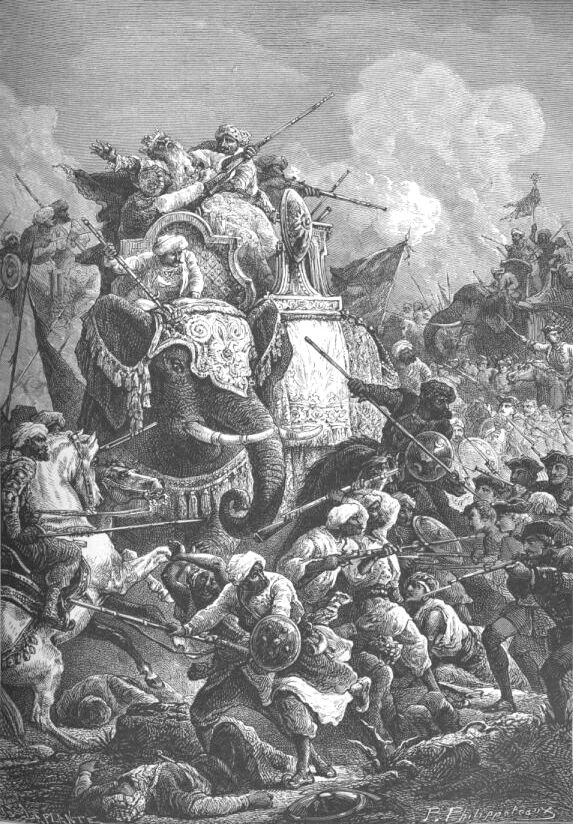
Death of the Nawab Anwaruddin Muhammed Khan in a battle against the French in 1749, by Paul Philippoteaux

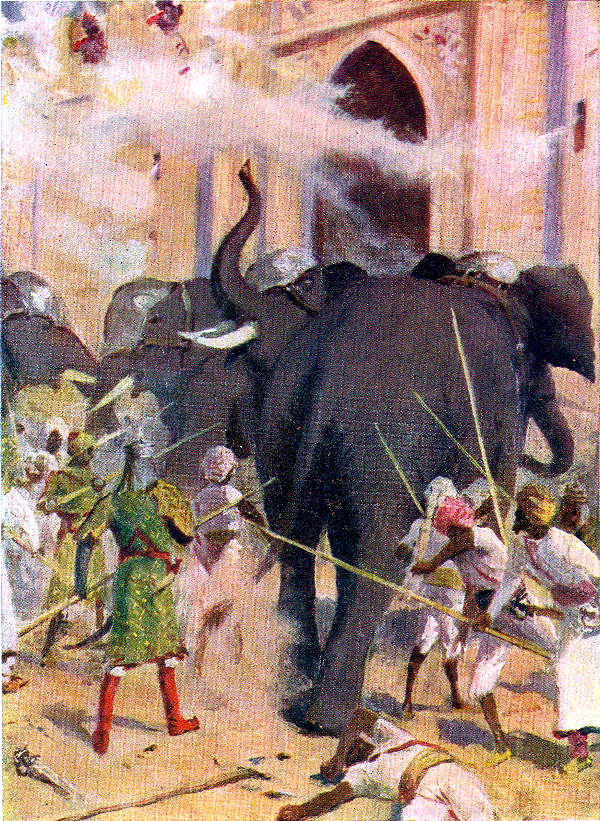
The Siege of Arcot was a major battle fought between Robert Clive and the combined forces of the Mughal Empire's Nawab of the Carnatic, Chanda Sahib, assisted by a small number of troops from the French East India Company

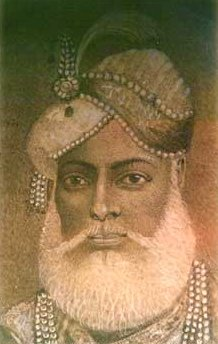
Muhammad Ali Khan Wallajah, (1717–1795)

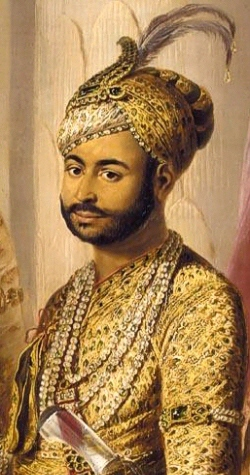
Umdat ul-Umara the Nawab of the Carnatic was a covert ally of Tipu Sultan

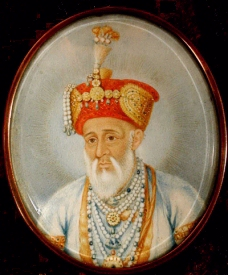
Azim Jah, eleventh and penultimate Nawab of the Carnatic, 1867 to 1874.

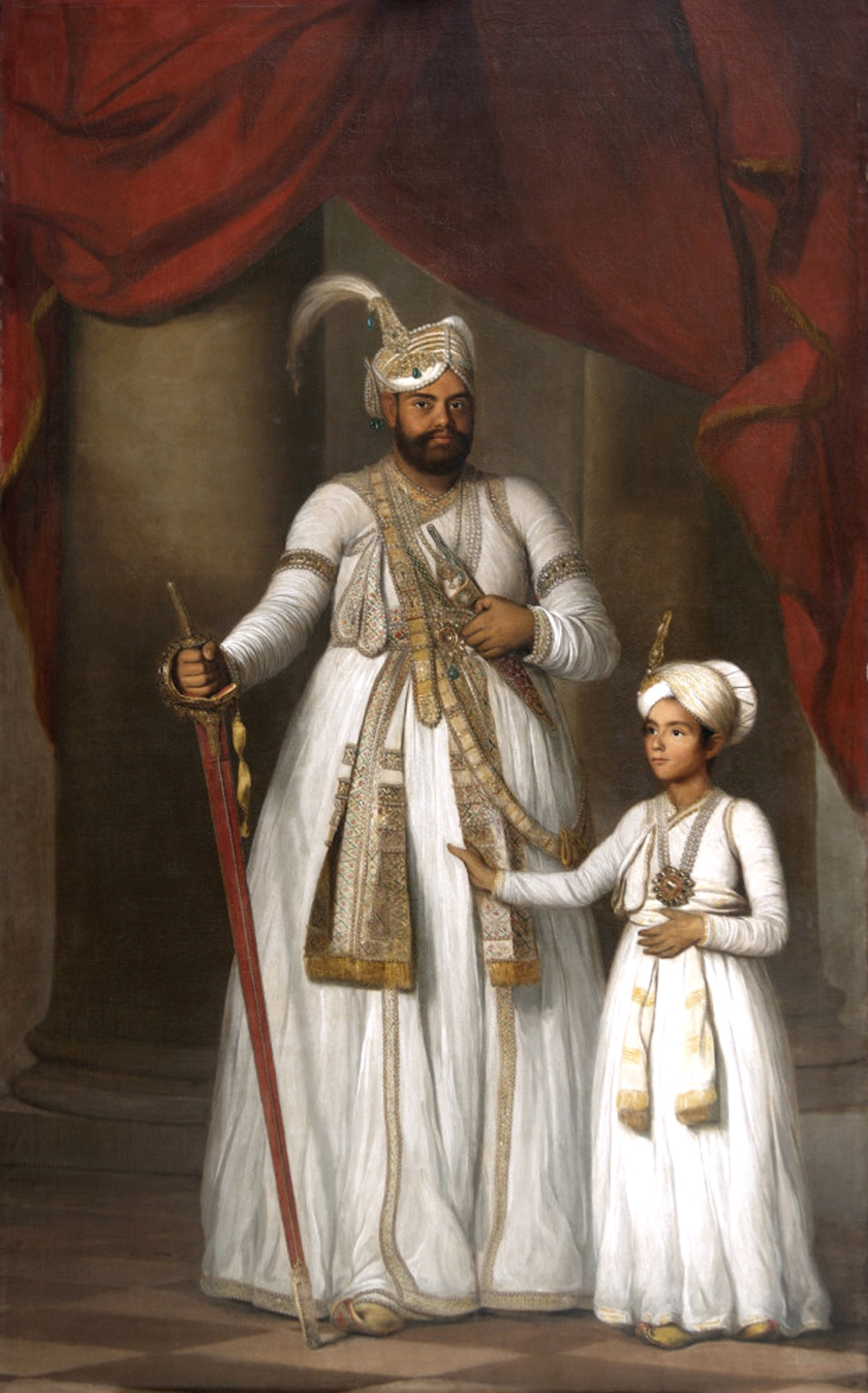
Azim-ud-Daula, Nawab of the Carnatic and his son Azam Jah.

== See also ==
- History of Tamil Nadu
- Nawab of Banganapalle
- Nawab of Masulipatam
- Nawab of Savanur
