= Urdu in Aurangabad =

Aurangabad is one of the historical cities of the Deccan, India. It is well known for its literary and cultural traditions. As this city was the stronghold of the Mughals, a number of civil and military officers, men of letters, citizens, etc., from Delhi came here with the result that Aurangabad was so much influenced by the North Indian culture that it was considered to be the Delhi of the Deccan. Thus, till 1763, Aurangabad was the seat of Government and the capital of the Deccan. Afterwards, when Hyderabad was made the capital, poets, literary men and learned people gradually left Aurangabad, and this city lost its literary prominence. Still, the city continued to produce men of literary genius well into the 20th century. Though Aurangabad had gained its importance since the time of Malik Ambar, up to 1700 CE, the literary achievements of that city concerning the Urdu language are not traceable. The Urdu spoken in Aurangabad is Hyderabadi Urdu, which in itself is a form of Dakhini Urdu.

== Early history ==
Early period
In the Deccan, the pre-Urdu language was known as Deccani or Dakhani. This pre-Urdu was taken to different parts of the country by soldiers, saints and Sufis and common people. It was introduced to the Deccan by the armies and camp followers of Ala'-ad-din Khalji (1296–1315). Sultan Alauddin Khalji (1296–1316) was the first Muslim ruler who sent a large military expedition to the Deccan at the beginning of the 14th century. Later, Muhammad bin-Tughluq (1325–1351) moved the capital to Daulatabad. He ordered the people of Delhi to move to that town in 1327, but later in 1340 had to abandon his plan and returned to Delhi.

In the Deccan, this pre-Urdu developed into one of the first Urdu literary dialects. There it was influenced by regional dialects of the South and came to be known as Deccani (Dakhani) and adopted the Persian script. It also replaced Persian in offices in the Deccan while Persian in North India was still a language of the court and maintained its place as the language of higher education in Muslim India even under British colonial rule down to 1832.
Philologically speaking, there always remained a good deal of difference between the Deccan and northern India's Urdu. Deccani (Dakhani) Urdu borrowed greatly from Marathi, Tamil, Telugu and other local languages and the Dakhani Urdu dialects merged into a single literary language in the 16th century.

It was in the Deccan that Urdu had its first literary efflorescence In the courts of Golconda and Bijapur after the fall of the Bahmani Kingdom in the 16th century. At Golconda, one of the rulers, Sultan Muhammad Quli Qutb Shah (1580–1611), was himself a poet. He had an ear for music and was sensitive to the rhythm. So he borrowed an enormous amount of vocabulary from Marathi, Tamil, Telugu and other local languages for his Urdu verse. One of his earliest collections of verse in Urdu is Kulliyyat.

In the autonomous kingdoms like Golconda and Bijapur, this Dakhani Urdu came to be cultivated as a literary language in isolation from the Urdu spoken in northern India and developed a rich literature. In the late 17th century, the Urdu in the North came to have direct contact with Dakhani after the completion of the Mughal conquest in the Deccan (Golconda and Bijapur), under Aurangzeb. The intellectual elite of Golconda and Bijapur migrated to Aurangabad, the secondary capital during the second half of his reign. Aurangabad became the meeting-place, and the habitat, for the merger of north Indian and Dakhani Urdu, towards the end of the 17th century.
In this way Augangabad became the centre of Urdu poetry and Literature in the late 17th and early 18th centuries.

Middle stage of Urdu development started from AD 1700 when Wali Aurangabadi’s, (1668–1744) who is called the 'Father of Rekhta (Urdu)' was from Aurangabad, the principal centre of Urdu poetry in the late 17th and early 18th century, and visited Delhi. He was also called the father of modern Urdu poetry. His visit and the arrival of his diwan had a deep impact on the literary atmosphere and marked the beginning of the literary revolution in the North. He again visited Delhi in 1722. But after that, he adopted the language of the North, the Urdu-e-Mu'alla, and he became a link between the old Dakhni and the new, rising, northern school of Urdu poetry, based in Delhi. Apart from the historical role he played, he is a consummate artist in verse and a master of the ghazal style, which was soon imitated by the poets of Delhi.

=== Contribution of the Sufis ===
The contribution of the Sufis to this language is great. They were concerned with common people and found Urdu the most suitable medium to convey their message to the people. It is the policy of Sufis to use the Urdu language for preaching their message of love of God and man and the equality of human beings before God. The first great leader of the Chishtiya order, Khwaja Moinuddin Hasan Ajmeri (1143–1237) reached the subcontinent around 1200. Nizamuddin Aulia of Delhi, the fourth saint of the Chishtiya order helped in popularizing this language. Shaikh Burhanuddin Gharib, a disciple of Shaikh Nizamuddin Auliya, had the credit of introducing the Hindavi language in the Deccan. Others after him like Zar Zari Zar Baksh and Khwaja Zainuddin Shirazi also contributed to the development of the language.

== Eighteenth century ==
Under the influence of Wali Aurangabadi’s progressive trends in the Ghazal form, some of the poets of Aurangabad also attempted it. Some of the contemporaries of Wali, viz., Mirza Dawood, Muhammad Mah Mehram and others belonged to Aurangabad. Dawood was one of them who pushed forward the literary movement. He belonged to this period. He died in 1195 AH. Mehram was the son of Nawab Shujaat Khan, the Subedar of Berar. He died in 1166 AH.

Balaji Trimbak Naik Zarra was also a good poet of the later half of this period. He composed poetry in Ghazal form and Marsiya as well. He was the pupil of Mirza Jan Rasa. His Dizoan is preserved in the Asifiya Library. In one of his Ghazals, he has mentioned some of the poets of Aurangabad such as Zia, Jaffer, Yakdam, Syed, Raza and others.

During this period, several poets from Burhanpur also settled at Aurangabad. One of them, viz. Asi, deserves a mention. Asi was in the service of Asaf Jah I. He died in 1172 AH. Besides Ghazals, he has left behind him two mathnavis, Khulasatul Maarif and Anwa-ul-Ulus.

In the second half of the 18th century, the Deccan produced Siraj, a poet of extraordinary calibre.
Siraj Aurangabadi was born at Aurangabad in 1127 AH. Right from his young age, he was inclined towards Sufism. He was held in high esteem in the circle of Sufis. Up to 1147 AH, he composed poems in Persian, but afterwards he was inclined towards Urdu poetry. He died in 1177 AH. He has left behind him a mathnavi, Bostan-i-Khyal and a collection of Ghazals. Bostan-i-Khyal is the longest mathnavi of the Deccan. It portrays the true picture of his emotional love, the feeling that dominates the heart. It deals with Sufism. He had also compiled a small collection of Persian poetry by the name of Diwanha. Several poets have benefited from his craftsmanship and talent. Some of them, viz. Khwaja Inayatulla Futuwat (1223 AH), Khwaja Abulbarkat Ishrat (1187 AH), Syed Ashraf Ali Faza (1195 AH), Mirza Mughal Kamtar (1183 AH), Lala Jaikishan Bejan, Muhamed Raza Beg Raza and Mirza Muhammedjani are worth mentioning.

Up to the end of the 19th century, Aurangabad produced some other poets of excellent repute.
Arifuddin Ajiz (1178) is a well-known poet of this period. He held the post of a Bakshi in the regime of Asaf Jah. Besides Ghazals, he has left behind him a mathnavi named Lal-O-Hohar also. A poet named Shahid (1178 AH) who hailed from Ahmedabad had settled at Aurangabad, and led the life of a Sufi. Mehar of this age has also been praised by Shafiq in his Tazkira. Mir Miran Raz (1180 AH) was a mansabdar. He composed poetry in Urdu and Persian.

Dargahquli Khan Dargah (1180 AH) could be regarded as one of the best poets of this period. He belonged to the well-known family of Salarjang. Dargah was not only a good soldier, but in the field of literature, he also showed his craftsmanship. He was a poet of a high calibre. He composed poetry in Urdu, Persian and Arabic. Besides Ghazals, he has shown his poetic talent in the Marsiya form also.

Fazli was one of the Sufi poets of Aurangabad. Besides Ghazals, he left behind him two mathnavis, Birah Bhaluka and Prem Luha. In prose also, he is the author of one work on Sufism, Zad-i-Azad.

Wahid and Sami were also top-ranking and senior poets of this period. The ancestors of Sami had come to the Deccan with Alamgir and settled there. A good number of young poets were trained by him. Lalchand Ramjin and Abdul Hadi were some of his good students. Sami left behind him two mathnavis, Sarvo-Shashad and Talib-o- Mohan.

Sarim was one of the mansabdars of Aurangabad. He was the son of Samsam-ud-Daula Shahnawaz Khan, the author of Massir-ul-Umra. For some time he was appointed Diwan of Berar. Besides, he also acted as the Nazir of Aurangabad and Risaladar of Daulatabad. Poets Mubtila and Nudrat also belonged to the generation of good poets of Aurangabad. Both of them were mansabdars in the Asif Jahi régime.

Zaka, son of Azad Bilgrami, a well-known learned man, was also a top-ranking poet of Aurangabad. He was also a mansabdar. He composed poetry in Urdu and Persian as well.

Tamanna was a court poet in the time of Samsamul Mulk and Arastujah. Tamanna compiled one Tazkira, Gul-i-Ajaib in 1194 A. H. The poet Qazi Muhammed Karan Bakhsh of Parbhani district was trained by Zaka. Arman, Sharar, Ashufta and Shauq, among others, were the students of Tamanna. Tamanna died in 1204 AH.

Mir Muhammad Sharif Maftun was also one of the Ustad poets of this period. Besides the poets mentioned above, Uruj, Anwar and Meherban also belonged to Aurangabad.

So far as Urdu prose is concerned, after 1150 A. H. several books on history, and of Tazkiras could be traced which have been written by the writers of Aurangabad. Tazkira Gulshan-i-Guftar tops the list. The author of this Tazkira is Khwaja Khan Hamid, and the date of its compilation is 1165 A. H. In the same year, a Tazkira Nikat-ush-Shaura was compiled by Mir Taqi Mir, in which he mentioned Wali as Aurangabadi, while Khwaja Khan, who belonged to Aurangabad, had mentioned Wali as Gujarati. Shams Waliulla, who hailed from Aurangabad and whose works are preserved in the India Library. The second Tazkira of Aurangabad has been compiled by Khwaja Inayatulla. The name of the Tazkira is Riyaz-i-Hasni, and the date of compilation is 1168 A. H.

After 1184 A. H. there appeared slackness in the literary activities of Aurangabad. The Nawabs, Mansabdars and the other high-ranking officers who were men of letters themselves and great patrons and lovers of art and literature, gradually left for Hyderabad as it was given the status of the capital of the Nizam's State. The poets and other literary personalities also left Aurangabad because of want of patronage.

== Nineteenth century ==
Eventually, in a short time, Aurangabad lost its literary importance. Yet, in spite of the apparent slackness, up to 1859, Aurangabad could boast of some poets of extraordinary genius.
Lala Lachmi-narian Shafiq of this period holds a high position. Shafiq was born in 1157 A. H. His father Mansaram and he held high posts in the Asaf Jahi regime. Shafiq had the rare distinction of being trained by Ghulam Ali Azad Bilgrami. After 1184 AH, he shifted to Hyderabad, but he always preferred Aurangabad. He composed poetry in Urdu and Persian as well. He left behind him several Tazkiras of poets, of which Chamanistam-i-shaura of the Urdu poet demands special mention. His mathnavi Taswir-i-janan is also well known. Some of his other works, viz., Maasir-i-Asifi, Maasir-i-Hyderi, Bisat-ul-Ghatnaim, Mirat-ul-Hind, Nakhlistan, Tazkira-i-Guru Nanak, etc., are in prose. Shafiq's brother Lala Roop Narain Zahin was also one of the good poets of this period. He was also a mansabdar. He died in 1223 AH.

Mir Bahauddin Uruj (1230 A. H.), Mir Hasan Ali Ima (1230 AH) and Mir Abdulqadir Meherban were also well-known poets. Meherban was well-versed in Persian and Arabic. He knew the Turkish language too. He was a student of Azad Bilgrami. It is said that he is the author of several books, but none of his books is now available. Shafiq has praised his poetic talents.

Besides the poets mentioned above Murtaza Mehdi (1178 A. H.), Kanahyya Mal Haquir (1177 A. H.), Mirza Ata Zia (1182 A. H.), Syed Fakhruddin Fakhr (1190 A. H.), Shaikh Ahmed Muziar (1194 AH), Saronji Rai Lala (1200 A. H.), Mirza Muhammadi Baig Mirza (1201 A. H.), Shaikh Nuruddin Nadir (1201 A. H.), Mohan Lal Mehtab (1202 A. H.), and many others also originally belonged to Aurangabad but later migrated to Hyderabad.

In the last decades of the 18th century and the beginning of the 19th century, a very important and authentic Tazkira, the Chamanistan-i-Shaura, was compiled by Lala Lachminarain Shafiq. Poet Tamanna is also an author of one Tazkira named Gul-i-Ajaib. It was compiled in 1194 A. H. Uruj has also left behind him one Tazkira, the Khizan-o-Bahar.

== Modern period ==
In the 20th century, Aurangabad produced Sikandar Ali Wajd, a poet, and Shaikh Chand (1906–36) produced great literary works. Waheed Akhtar (1934 — 1996), an Urdu poet, writer, critic, distinguished orator, scholar and philosopher, was also from Aurangabad. His early education took place at Chelipura High School, a government school in Aurangabad. Renowned Urdu satire and humour writer Yusuf Nazim also belonged to Aurangabad, as he was born in 1918 (died 2009) at Jalna in Aurangabad district. He did his early education in Jalna and Intermediate from Osmania College Aurangabad, he graduated from Osmania University Hyderabad.
At Aurangabad, a society called Anjuman Tarraqqi i Urdu for the advancement of Urdu was founded by Maulvi Abdul Haq, who was the Head of the Urdu section of Osmania University and was once the chief of the Translation Bureau. The Anjuman used to issue a quarterly journal titled ‘Urdu’ which rendered valuable service and published noteworthy literary works in Urdu. (Published Standard English – Urdu dictionary, Aurangabad 1937). Later Maulvi Abdul Haqq moved the offices of Anjuman Taraqqi-i-Urdu from Aurangabad (Deccan) to Delhi in 1938.

During the erstwhile Hyderabad State the Court language was Urdu. Aurangabad was a "Suba" (province), and as headquarters of the province, all the records and proceedings, as well as administrative files, were maintained in the Urdu language. On going through the oldest record, it appears that the same is consigned to record in 1296 Fasli (comparatively 1888 CE, approximately). The Head Judge of the region (province) was called as "Nazim-e-Adalat Suba", whereas the other District Judges such as Parbhani, Beed and Osmanabad were known as "Nazim-e-Adalat Zilla". The records and proceedings arising out of Parbhani, Beed and Osmanabad are consigned to the Central Record Room of Aurangabad being a "Suba". The Court language was Urdu even after the abolition of erstwhile Hyderabad State, and this continued till 1956.

== See also ==
- Wali Aurangabadi
- Siraj Aurangabadi
- Azad Bilgrami
- Sikandar Ali Wajd
- Waheed Akhtar
- Khwaja Habib Ali Shah
- Shah Nawaz Khan
- List of Urdu language poets
- Urdu poetry
- Urdu

== External reading ==
- List of Urdu Authors
- Hindu Writers of Urdu Literature
- Encyclopaedic survey of Islamic culture - Mohamed Taher
