= Valley of Saints =

In Khuldabad, Aurangabad, Maharashtra

The Valley of Saints is located in Khuldabad, a town in the Aurangabad district of Maharashtra, India. Several Sufi saints of the Chishti Order chose to reside in Khuldabad in the fourteenth century. The dargah of Muntajib al-Din (Khuldabad), and the tomb of the last great Mughal emperor Aurangzeb are located here. Muntajib al-Din, known best by his epithet Zar Zari Zar Baksh, migrated to this area in the 14th century at the request of his teacher, Nizamuddin Auliya of Delhi.

== See also ==
- Sufi Saints of Aurangabad
- Khuldabad
- Khwaja Zainuddin Shirazi
- Sayyid Burhan-ud-din
- Ganj Rawan Ganj Baksh
- Zar Zari Zar Baksh
