= Azad Bilgrami =

Indian poet and scholar (1704–1786)

- Born: 29 June 1704; Bilgram, Mughal India now Uttar Pradesh, India
- Died: 15 September 1786 (aged 82)
- Other name: Ghulam 'Ali Azad Bilgrami

Academic background
- Influences: Mir Abdul Jalil of Selsibil, Mir Saiad Muhammad, Muhammad Hayat

Academic work
- Main interests: Arabic, Persian and Urdu
- Notable works: Yad-i-Baiza, Ma asir ul-Kiram Tarikh-i-Bilgram, Sarw-i-Azad
- Influenced: Nasir Jang

Azad Bilgrami (29 June 1704 – 15 September 1786) was a scholar of Arabic, Persian, and Urdu languages in 18th-century India. The King of Yemen Husayin II had acknowledged his poetic qualities and accorded him the title of Hassan Al-Hind.

== Early life ==
His original name was Mir Ghulam Ali Husaini Wasiti, although he is best known as Ghulam 'Ali Azad Bilgrami. He was born in Bilgram, India, a small town in the Indian state of Uttar Pradesh. He gained a reputation for possessing command over all topics of literature and learning. He was instructed in language by Mir Abdul Jalil of Selsibil; in prosody and literature by Mir Saiad Muhammad; in the Koran by Muhammad Hayat; and in all excellences by 'Abdul Wabhat Tantawi. According to Masalati Shuara, he studied eloquence with Muhammad Aslam Salim and Shaikh Saad Ullah Gulshan of Ahmedabad. As a youth he left Bilgram and stayed for two years in Delhi. He visited Lahore and Multan and made acquaintance with scholars of these cities, and lived for five years in the province of Sind. He then traveled to the cities of Mecca and Medina, where he devoted himself to religious studies particularly specializing in Sihah-i-Sittah i.e. six books of traditions of Muhammad Ismail Bukhari, Muslim Nishapuri, Ibn Majah, Abu Daud, Abu Isa Tirmizi and Abu Abdul Rehman Nisai.

== Life in Aurangabad ==
He returned from Hijaz to India and lived in the city of Aurangabad, Deccan till his death. Nasir Jang and other nobles of the Nizam's state were his devotees but he avoided worldly favours and preferred a life of piety and poverty. Azad was a poet and a biographer of poets. He was the friend of Shah Nawaz Khan, and when the latter was murdered, he collected his friend's manuscripts (Ma'asir al-umara) which were scattered in all directions and published them.

Azad compiled his two diwans of poetry in Arabic and Persian. Among the works of lasting value were the dictionaries of poets.

== Works ==
- Yad-i-Baiza – Biographies of 532 poets.
- Ma asir ul-Kiram Tarikh-i-Bilgram, which dealt with 80 sufis and 70 learned men of the author's hometown.
- Sarw-i-Azad – sketches of 143 poets born in India.
- Khizanah-i-Amirah – notices of 135 poets famous for obtaining rich rewards from patrons. It also contained details of events to which Azad was eye witnesses.
- Rauzat ul Auliya – on lives of saints buried in Khuldabad.
- Ghizlan ul Hind – a book on Indian womanhood as reflected in Persian literature.
- Anis ul Muhaqqiqin – on Indian saints.

Azad's skill as a poet, especially as a panegyrist of Muhammad, has long been recognized. His one critically edited Arabic work, the Subhat al-marjan (The Coral Rosary), is approvingly cited for its praise of India, which describes India as the first domicile of Adam and for Azad's knowledge of Indian languages and culture, and his literary-critical and poetic sensibilities.

The Miratu-l Khayal ("Mirror of fancy") by Shir Khan Lodi states that "the author of the Khazanahi A'amirah ... composed the Tazkirah at the request of his relation Muhammad Auladi Muhammad. Ibrahim Khalil gives the life of ' Azad in his Suhuf, and states that " up to the present time, which is the 7th year of Shah 'Alam, he is still occupied in the composition of Persian and Arabic poetry. His works are numerous, and among others, he has arranged three Tazkirahs of poets,-the first called Yadi Bayza; the; second Servi Azad; and the third Khazanahi Aamirah."

In the Khulasat ul 'Afkar, it is mentioned that "Azad was a distinguished poet settled at Aurangabad, where he was much honoured, and associated on friendly terms with the sons of 'Asaf Jah. He wrote a Persian diwan, and a book of Arabic elegies and mesnawis. His Tazkirahs are considered noble proofs of his proficiency in everything connected with prosody, versification, and composition, both in Persian and Arabic."

== Recognition ==
His works in Persian and Arabic have been cited by scholars and historians since they appeared, although Azad's Persian works have received more scholarly attention than his Arabic ones. He was celebrated in India, Arabia, and Egypt for his learning and literature.

He is buried near the Dargah of Sufi saint Amir Hasan Dihlawi Sijzi (d.1336) at Khuldabad near Aurangabad in India.

== See also ==
- Wali Dakhni
- Siraj Aurangabadi
- Sikandar Ali Wajd
- Khuldabad
- Urdu poetry
