= Samsam ud Daula Shah Nawaz Khan =

Mughal courtier and historian (1700–1758)

Khan, Samsam ud-Daula Shah Nawaz Khan
- صمصام الدولہ شاہنواز خان
- Born: Abd ur-Razzaq Hussain; 28 February 1700; Lahore, Subah of Lahore, Mughal Empire, now Punjab, Pakistan
- Died: 11 May 1758 (aged 58); Aurangabad, Maharashtra, Nizam of Hyderabad, now India
- Resting place: Aurangabad, Maharashtra, now India
- Occupations: Historian, Courtier, Wazir
- Relatives: Amir Kamal ud-Din Hussain (grandfather)
- Writing career
- Language: Persian language
- Years active: 1740–1758
- Subject: History of India
- Notable work: Ma'asir al-umara

Samsam ud Daula Shah Nawaz Khan (28 February 1700 – 11 May 1758), was a historian and courtier of Qamar-ud-din Khan, Asif Jah I, the first Nizam of Hyderabad. He compiled the history Ma'asir al-umara.

== Personal life ==
Shah Nawaz Khan Shams ud Daula was born at Lahore on 28 February 1700, and was originally called 'Abdur Razzak al Husain. Early in life, he went to Aurangbad where most of his relations resided. His father was Mir Hasan Ali, son of Kazim Khan the diwan of Multan. His father died at age 19 in Lahore, and Abdur Razzak was a posthumous child. His mother was the paternal granddaughter of Amanat Khan, the Diwan of the Deccan during the viceroyalty of Khan Jahan Bahadur Kokaltash, who was also an uncle of Kazim Khan. His mother's maternal grandfather was Muhammad Murad Khan Uzbeg, the deputy governor of Aurangbad.

He had four sons: Mir Abdul Hayy Khan (who finished his father's memoirs in 1780), Mir Abdus Salaam, Mir Abdun Nabi and Mir Abdul Gani.

=== Professional life ===
He was appointed diwan of Berar by 'Asaf Jah; but subsequently had to retire in disgrace into private life for having favoured the revolt of Nasir Jang. After passing five years in seclusion, he again found favour with Asaf Jah, and was reinstated in 1747 in the diwani of Berar. He enjoyed the highest honors under Nasir Jang, and became the chief minister under Sulabat Jang. Shah Nawaz played a conspicuous part in the struggles for supremacy between the English and the French; he, along with his sons Mir Abdul Gani and Mir Abdun Nabi, was assassinated at Aurangbad on 11 May 1758.

=== Works ===
The father son duo of Shah Nawaz Khan and Abdul Hai Khan composed the Ma-'asiru-l Umra, a biographical dictionary of the illustrious men who flourished in Hindostan and the Dakhan from the time of Akbar to H. 1155. He was given the title of Shams ud Daula by Asaf Jah. They resided in the city of Aurangbad. Shah Nawaz Khan was a friend of the great poet Gholam Ali Azad Bilgrami. It was during this period of retirement that Shah Nawaz composed the Ma-'asiru-l Umra, a biographical dictionary of the illustrious men who flourished in Hindustan and the Dakhan from the time of Akbar to AH 1155.

== Shams ud Daula Samsam Jang ==
Samsam ud Daula or Abdul Hai Khan, the son of Shah Nawaz Khan, was born in 1729, and was elevated to the rank of " Khan" in 1748 by Nasir Jang, who also bestowed on him the diwani of Berar. Sulabat Jung made him commandant of Daulatabad; but after the murder of his father Shah Nawaz Khan in 1757, Abdul Hai Khan was imprisoned at Golkonda, till released in 1759 by Nizam 'Ali Khan, who treated him with marked distinction, and reinstated him in his paternal title of Shams ud Daula Samsam Jang. 'Abdul Hai Khan's title at first was Shams ud Daula Dilawar Jang, but he was called Shams ul Mulk, and his poetical name was " Sarim."

Works

He completed his father's manuscripts which had been collected and published by Mir Gholam Ali, and gave them to the world in their present form in 1779.

== See also ==
- Ma'asir al-umara
- Azad Bilgrami
