= Tadhkirah =

Tadhkira (تذكرة), Arabic for "memorandum" or "admonition", is frequently used as part of the title of literary works of the nature of authoritative collections or summaries. It may refer to the following works:

- al-Tadhkirat al-Harawīya fī al-ḥiyal al-ḥarabīya ("al-Harawi’s Admonition Regarding War Stratagems") by Ali ibn Abi Bakr al-Harawi (d. 1215)
- Tadhkirat al-Khawāṣ by Sibt ibn al-Jawzi (d. 1256)
- Tadhkirat al-Awliyā’ (13th century), biographies of Sufi saints.
- al-Tadhkira fī ʿilm al-Hayʾa "Memento on Astronomy", a work on the science of astronomy by Nasir al-Din al-Tusi (d. 1274)
- Tadhkirat al-Ḥuffāẓẓ (14th century), biographies of hadith masters by al-Dhahabi
- Sharḥ al-tadhkira (16th century), a commentary on al-Tusi’s Memento on Astronomy by al-Birjandi
- A work by Dawud al-Antaki (d. 1599) on medicine, natural history and the occult sciences
- Tadhkirat al-Nisyān (c. 1750), a biographical dictionary of the Moroccan rulers of Timbuktu, see Askiya dynasty.
- Tadhkirat al-umarā (1830), a Persian-language work by James Skinner (East India Company officer).
- Tadhkirat Khandan Azizi by Hakim Abdul Aziz (d. 1911)
- Tadhkirah (Ahmadiyya) (1976), a collection of texts the by Ahmadiyya founder Mirza Ghulam Ahmad (1873–1908)
- Tadhkirat al-Fuqahā (1997), a work on Twelver Shi'i Muslim jurisprudence.
- Tezkire, bibliographical dictionaries of poets and poetry from the Ottoman Empire
- al-Takmila fi Sharh al-Tadhkira, a commentary on al-Tusi’s Memento on Astronomy by Shams al-Din al-Khafri

== See also ==
- Dhikr
- Afghan identity card
