= Khuldabad =

Khuldabad खुल्दाबाद
- City
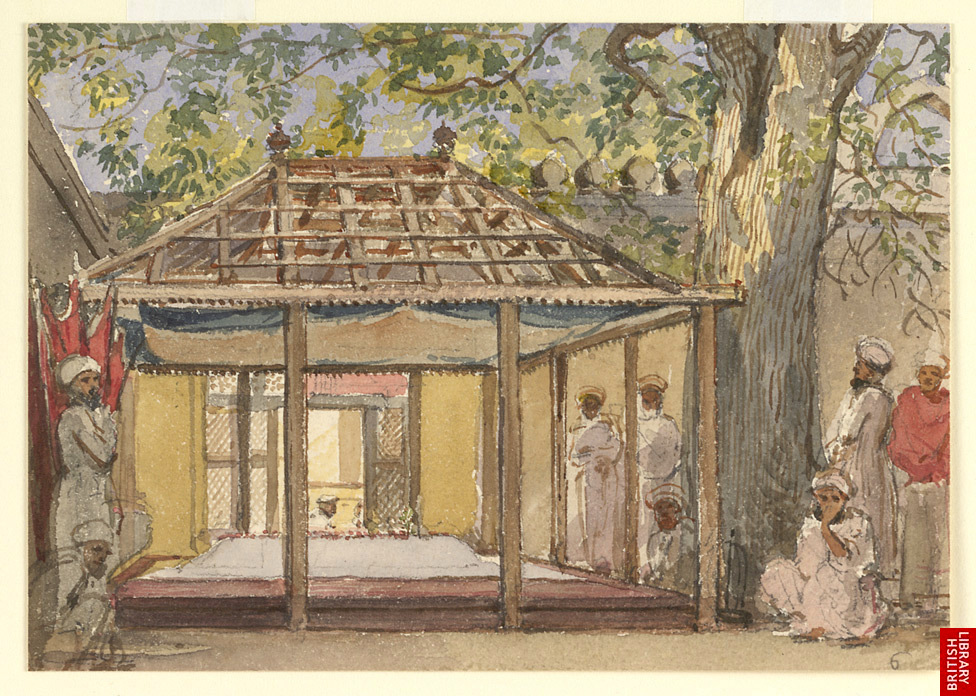
- Tomb of Aurangzeb, Khuldabad, 1850s.
- Nickname: Rauza - "garden of paradise"
- Location in Maharashtra, India
- Coordinates: 20.009524°N 75.188799°E
- Country: India
- State: Maharashtra
- District: Aurangabad
- Named for: Aurangzeb
- Elevation: 857 m (2,812 ft)

Population (2001)
  - Total: 12,794

Languages
  - Official: Marathi
  - Commonly Speak: Urdu, Hindi
- Time zone: UTC+5:30 (IST)
- Postal code: 431101
- Vehicle registration: MH-20

Khuldabad, also called Rauza ('Garden of paradise'), is a city (municipal council) and a taluka of Aurangabad district in the Indian state of Maharashtra. It is known as the Valley of Saints, or the Abode of Eternity, because in the 14th century, several Sufi saints chose to reside here. The Bhadra Maruti Temple and Dargah of Zar Zari Zar Baksh, Shaikh Burhan ud-din Gharib Chisti and Shaikh Zain-ud-din Shirazi, along with the tomb of the Mughal emperor Aurangzeb and his trusted General Asif Jah I, the first Nizam of Hyderabad, are located in this town. It is a holy and spiritual city of Islamic saints.

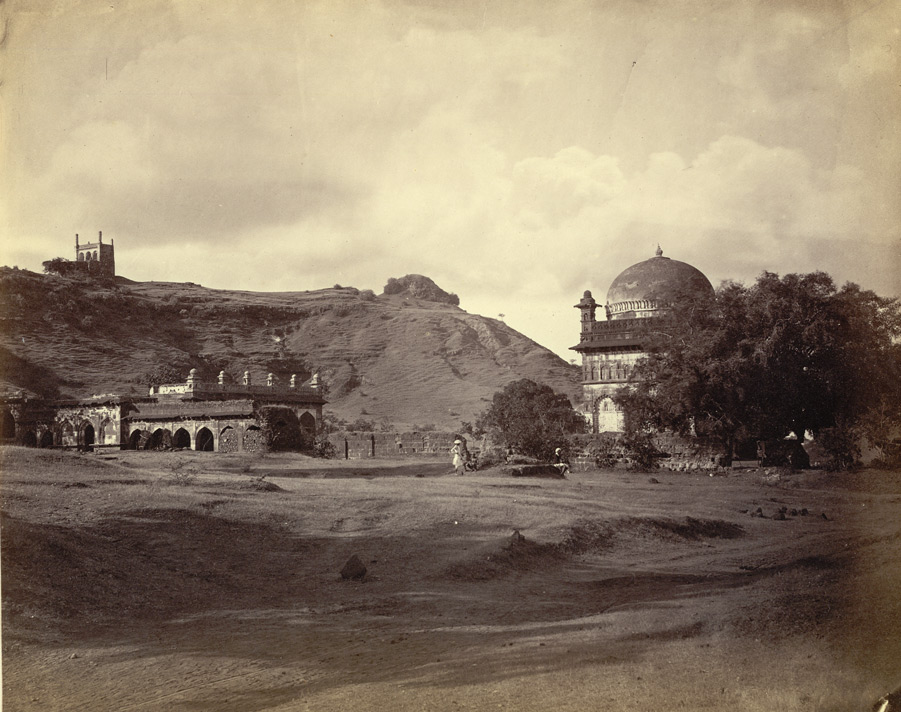
Malik Ambar's tomb, 1860s

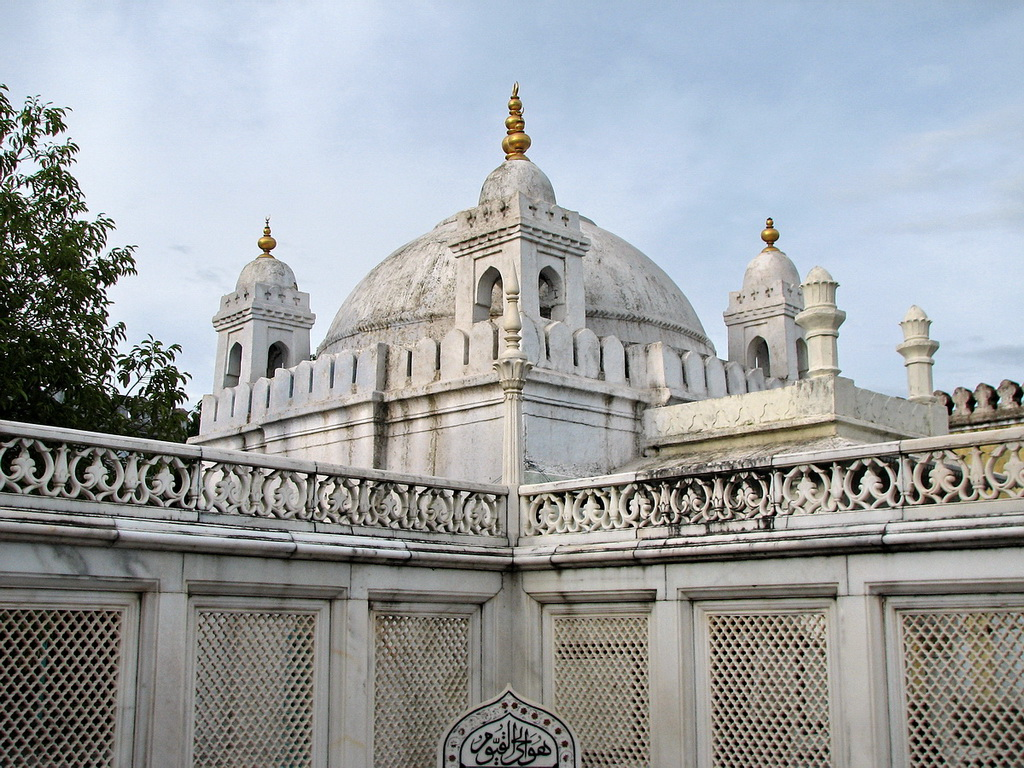
Zainuddin Shirzai Maqbara

The place has famous Bhadra Maruti Temple. People come from Aurangabad and nearby places by walk for offering puja on Hanuman Jayanti and on Saturdays in Marathi calendar month "Shravan". Nearby is the Valley of the Saints, which is purported to contain the graves of 1500 Sufi saints.

== Etymology ==
The name 'Khuldabad' translates to 'Abode of Eternity'. It is derived from the post-humous title of Mughal Emperor Aurangzeb, 'khuld-makan' (lit. 'Dwelling in Paradise'); the name came into currency following Aurangzeb's interment in the city. Priorly, the city was known as 'Rauza' (lit. 'Garden of Paradise'), a common term used to describe Sufi shrines in South Asia.

== History ==
Khuldabad's historical and religious significance dates back to the 14th century, when Muhammad bin Tughluq of the Delhi Sultanate shifted the population of Delhi to Daulatabad in the Deccan. A significant portion of the Muslim elite that migrated consisted of Sufis, many of whom settled in the neighbouring town of Rauza (the older name of Khuldabad). Some of these initial migrants included Sufi saints Zar Zari Zar Baksh and Burhanuddin Gharib. As the place of burial for many of these saints, the town acquired a sacred character as a centre of Chishti Sufism.

Indo-Islamic rulers in the Deccan established connections with the town on account of its religious importance. Malik Ambar, prime minister of the Ahmadnagar Sultanate, chose to be buried here. The Faruqi ruling dynasty of the Khandesh Sultanate had close ties with the town; the dynasty's founder named his capital Burhanpur after the Khuldabad-based Burhanuddin Gharib. The Faruqis financed the town's shrines by granting them the revenue of three villages.

Mughal patronage of the town began as early as the reign of emperor Akbar, who continued the Faruqi patronage of Khuldabad after capturing Khandesh. Later rulers Shah Jahan and Aurangzeb maintained financial support. Aurangzeb's rule in particular saw Khuldabad acquire an increased importance as a burial site for Mughal royals, since it neighboured Aurangabad, which served as the Mughal Empire's de facto capital during his rule. Aurangzeb himself chose to be buried here, following which the town acquired its modern name of Khuldabad from the ruler's post-humous title 'khuld-makan'.

Mughal patterns of patronage persisted with the Mughals' successors in the Deccan, the Asaf Jahis (also known as the Nizams). Several nobles of the dynasty were buried in the town, including the founder Asaf Jah I. Khuldabad's continued importance was due to nearby Aurangabad's continued function as capital of the Asaf Jahi territories. Both the Mughals and the Asaf Jahis made architectural contributions to the town.

== Geography and climate ==
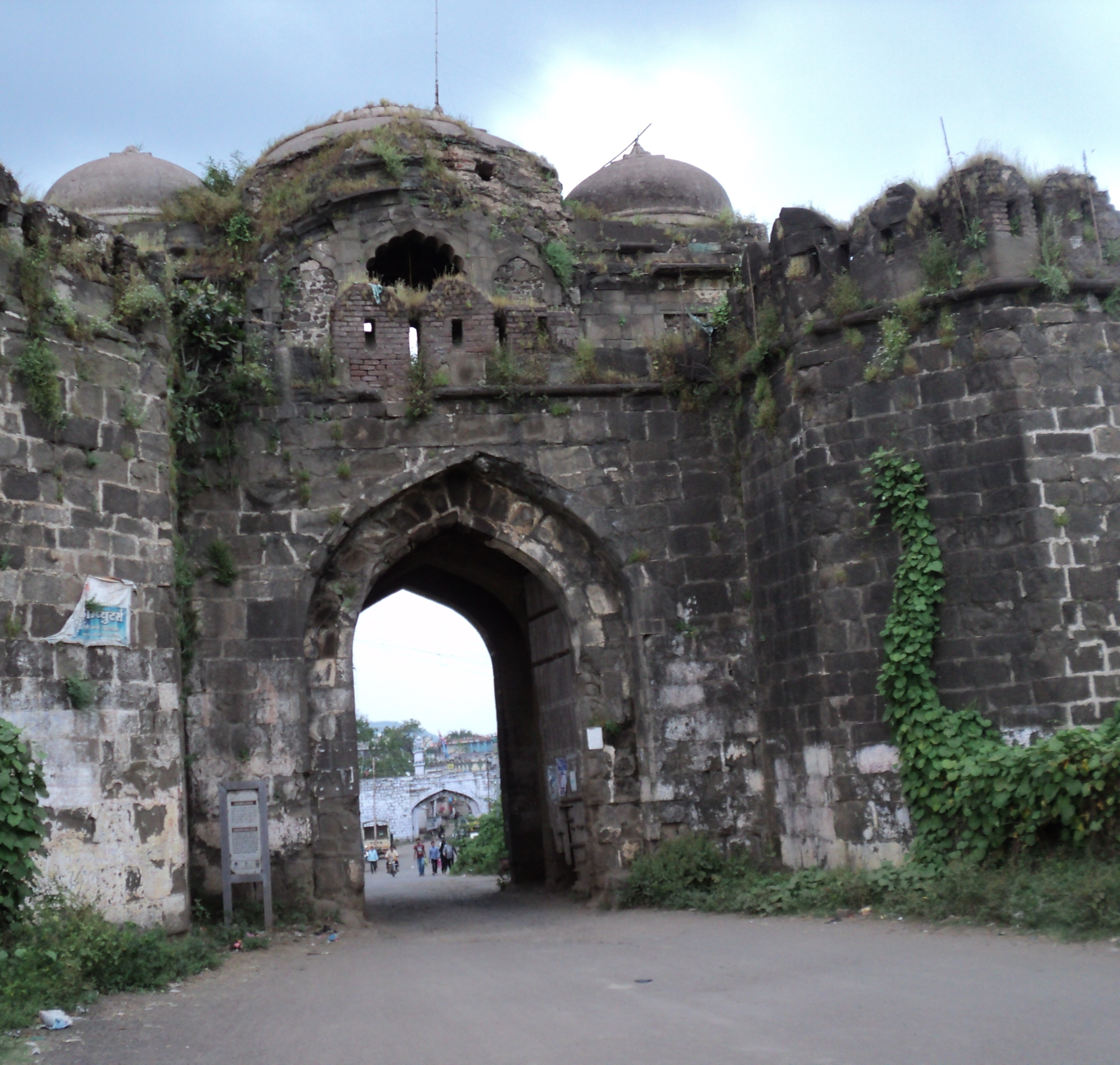
Nagarkhana Gate

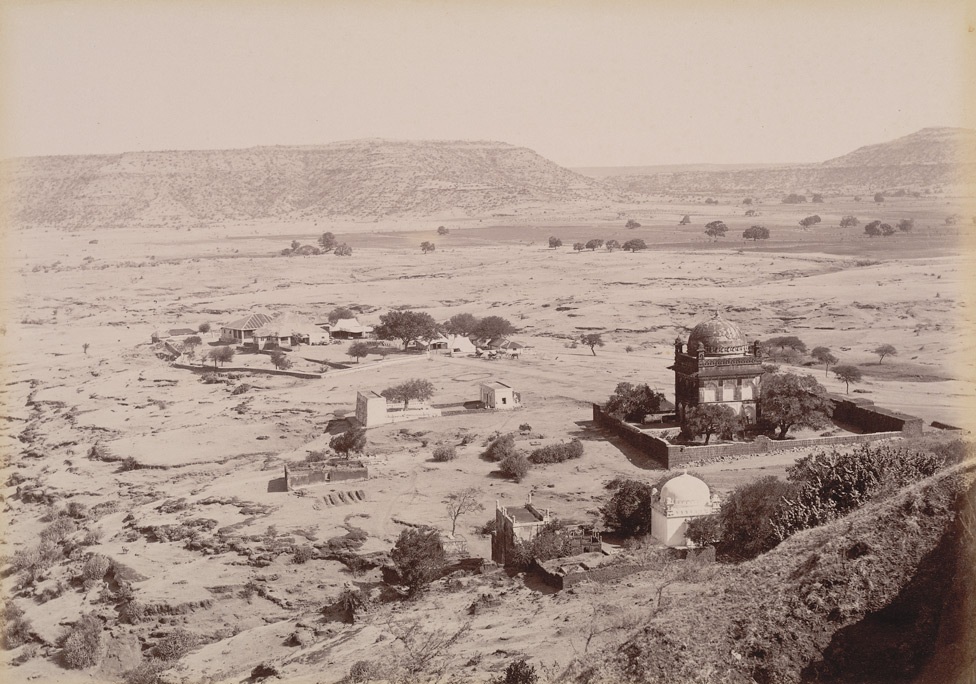
Rest house, 1890s

Khuldabad is located at 20.05°N 75.18°E. It enjoys a pleasant climate, moderated by its altitude (2,732 feet / 832.7 metres). The town rises about 500 feet (152.4 metres) above the surrounding plains. The world famous Ellora caves are about 4 miles from Khuldabad. Lodging such as State Guest-house and traveller's bungalows are provided to tourist and they are maintained by Zilla Parishad.

== Demographics ==
As of 2001 India census, Khuldabad had a population of 12,794. Males constitute 52% of the population and females 48%. Khuldabad has an average literacy rate of 64%, higher than the national average of 59.5%: male literacy is 72%, and female literacy is 56%. In Khuldabad, 16% of the population is under 6 years of age.

Religion in Khuldabad city (2011)
1. Islam (58.1%)
2. Hinduism (41.1%)
3. Buddhism (0.44%)
4. Jainism (0.22%)
5. Christianity (0.06%)
6. Sikhism (0.01%)
7. Others (0.05%)

== Places of interest ==
Khuldabad is surrounded by a high fortified wall built by Aurangzeb. It has seven gates: Nagarkhana, Pangra, Langda, Mangalpeth, Kumbi Ali, Hamdadi and a wicket called Azam Shahi. The gateway in the direction of Aurangabad is approached by a paved ascent which continues inside the town for about 200 to 300 feet. The wall has collapsed at many places and may collapse totally before long. The sepulchre of Aurangzeb lies almost midway between the north and the south gates. It is within the enclosure containing the dargah of Burhan ud din. A steep paved ascent some 30 yards in length leads from the road side to the entrance of the building. After passing through a domed-porch and gateway, erected in about 1760, a large quadrangle is entered, on three sides of which are open-fronted buildings.

While one of these is used for conducting a school, others are set apart for the use of travellers. In the centre of the south side is a nagarkhana and a mosque in the west. A facsimile of the hall of the mosque is just below, with a flight of steps descending to it from the verge of the platform. Right opposite the north end of the mosque is a small open gateway leading into an inner courtyard.

=== Aurangzeb's Tomb ===
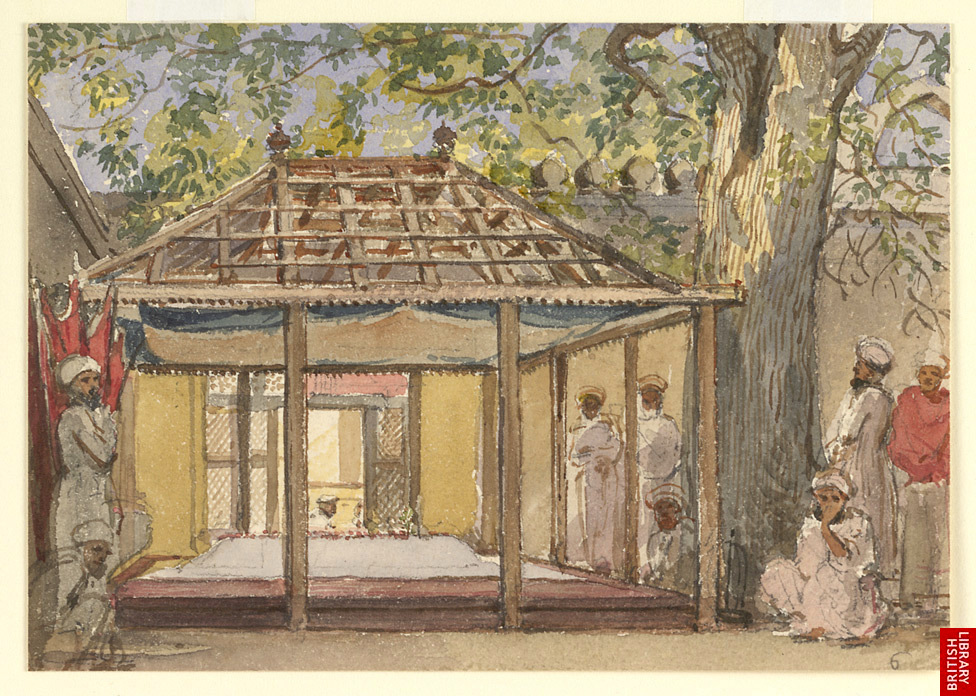
Tomb of Aurangzeb, 1850s

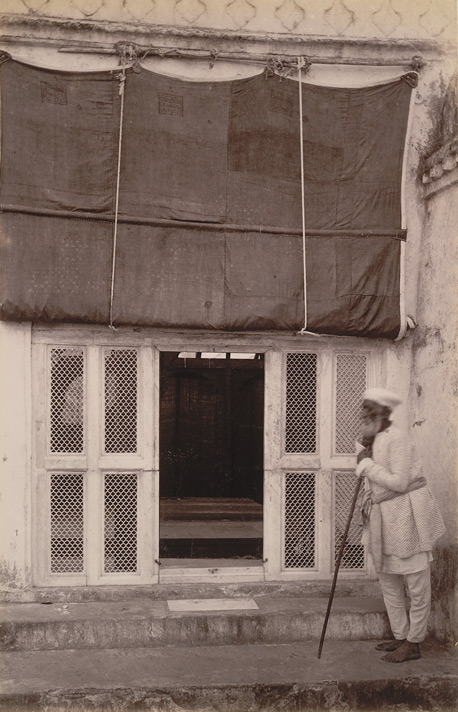
Tomb of Aurangzeb, 1890s

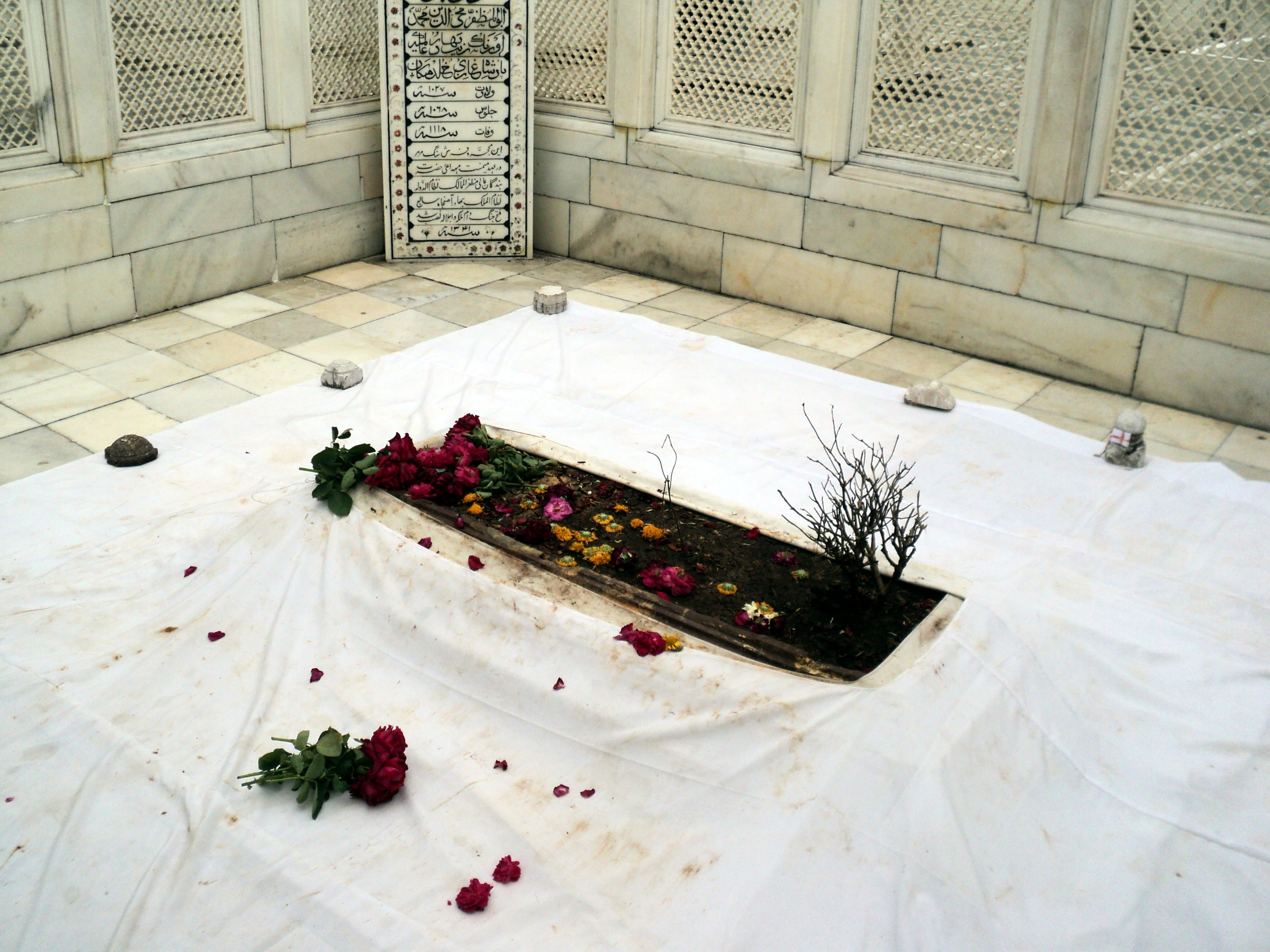
Aurangzeb's tomb, a recent picture

Aurangzeb's tomb is in the south-east angle of this courtyard. Facing it is a long low building similar to the one in the outer quadrangle, and in the north end is a small room containing the pall and decorations of the tomb. The grave lies immediately to the right of the entrance and is remarkably simple, in keeping with Aurangzeb's own wishes. The grave lies in the middle of a stone platform, raised about half a foot from the floor.

Aurangzeb funded his resting place by knitting caps and copying the Qu'ran, during the last years of his life, works which he sold anonymously in the market place. Unlike the other great Mughal rulers, Aurangzeb's tomb is not marked with a large mausoleum instead he was interred in an open air grave in accordance with his Islamic principles. The gateway and domed porch were added in 1760. The floor is of marble, a neat railing of perforated marble is on three sides, and the wall of Burhan-ud-din's dargah forms the fourth side. It was erected by the Nizam at the request of Lord Curzon, then Viceroy of India (who was shocked by the simplicity of the tomb) in the year 1911. On ceremonial occasions, Aurangzeb's grave is draped with richly embroidered cloth but ordinarily it is covered by a white sheet. Close by on the right, are the tombs of Azam Shah, his wife and daughter.

=== Tombs of Azam Shah and his wife ===
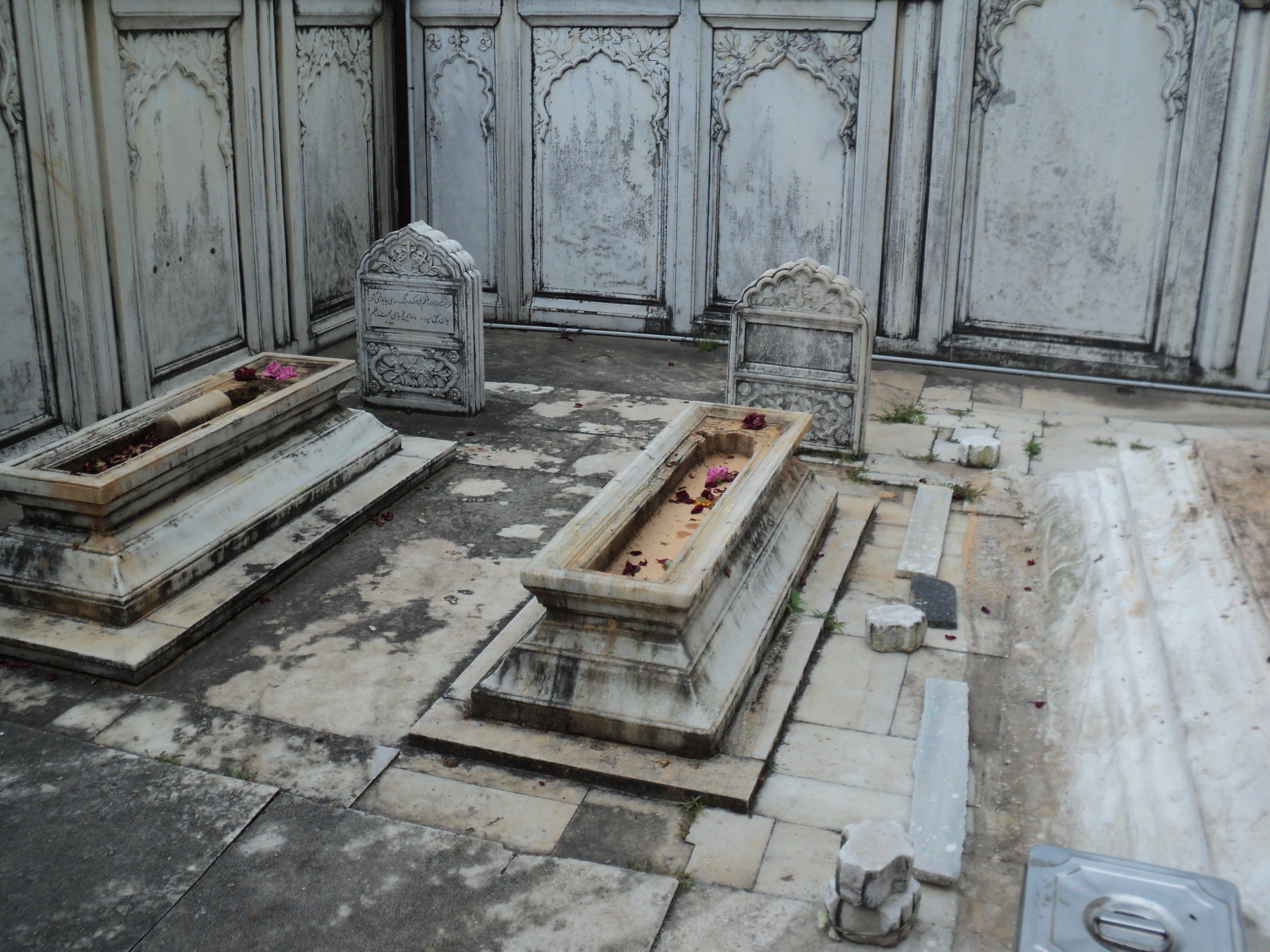
Tomb of Azam Shah and his wife, Khuldabad

A small marble enclosure, to the cast of Aurangzeb's tomb, contains the remains of Azam Shah and his wife. Azam was Aurangzeb's second son. Close by is another grave, said to be that of daughter of a Muhammedan saint. The marble screen contains 18 panels, each 6 feet in height. The sides and corners are surmounted by small minarets, also of marble. Marble is employed to pave the interior too and Azam Shah's grave has a small marble headstone ornamented with carved floral designs.

=== Zainuddin Shirazi Dargah ===
Midway between these tombs and that of Aurangzeb, is the mausoleum of Sayyed Zain ud din, a Muhammedan saint highly revered by the Muslims. On the east side it contains a number of verses inscribed from the Quran and the date of the saint's death, 771 H. (1370 A. D). Sheikh Zain-ud-din was born at Shiraz, in H. 701 and came to Delhi by way of Mecca. He studied under Maulana Kamal ud din of Samana and accompanied him to Daulatabad. He held the office of the Kazi at Daulatabad and in H. 737 was invested with the mantle of the Caliphate, but did not actually succeed until after Burhan-ud-din's death in H. 741. Zain-ud-din's sayings have bean recorded by Shaikh Husain in his Hidayatu-l-Kabul. The mausoleum was erected by his disciples much later. It is surrounded by a large quadrangular courtyard, and the enclosure has two gates chased with brass, silver and brass. The court has two mosques, one on a higher and the other on a lower level, a sloping pavement leading up to the former. There are open-fronted buildings on all sides, and a nagarkhana or a music chamber at the east end. The west end is used as a school where the Quran is taught. The doors of the shrine are inlaid with silver plates, and the step below is embellished with a number of curiously cut and polished stones. The grave inside is covered with a richly embroidered pall, and has the usual string of ostrich eggs suspended over it. A small room in an angle of the courtyard wall is said to contain the robe of the prophet, which is exhibited once a year on 12th Rabi-ul-awal. The relics of the parahan and the taj given to Burhan-ud-din on succeeding to the Caliphate we carefully preserved in a wooden box placed in one of the apartments of Zain-ud, din's dargah.

=== Burhanuddin's Mausoleum ===
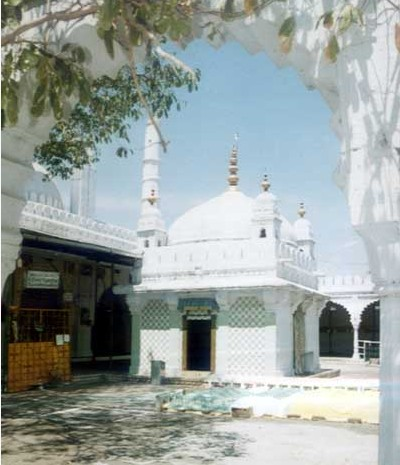
Tomb of Sayyid Burhan-ud-din, Khuldabad

Opposite the building which contains the tombs of Aurangzeb and Zain-ud-din, is another of almost equal interest. This has also a large quadrangular courtyard having open fronted building on all sides, and a nagarkhana at the east end. In the courtyard are two large drums. One of them is in fair order, while the parchment of the other has been destroyed and only the huge iron hemisphere remains. The west end of the quadrangle is used as a school and a door here gives access to an inner courtyard containing several graves. Facing the entrance is the tomb of Sayyad Burhan ud din, a Sufi Saint. Burhan-ud-din studied under Nizamuddin Auliya, the Sultan-ul-mashaikh of Delhi and was invested with the cap and the mantle, the symbols of the Kaliphat, in succession to the Sultan-ul-mashaikh. He migrated to Daulatabad in the wake of Muhammad Tughluq's transfer of capital from Delhi and later, made Khuldabad his abode, dying there in 744 H. (1344 A. D). Within the shrine are preserved some hair of the prophet's beard. The shrine doors are plated with plates of metal wrought into fanciful designs of trees and flowers. There is a mosque in front of the dargah. Within the town are dargahs to other Muslim saints like Muntajab ud din, Sayyad Yusuf etc.

=== Nizam-ul-Mulk Asaf Jah's Tomb ===
To the right of Burhan-ud-din's tomb are the resting places of Nizam-ul-Mulk Asaf Jah I, the founder of the Hyderabad dynasty, his second son Nasir Jang. The Hyderabad dynasty continued to rule from Hyderabad until after India won her independence, and of one of his consorts. They are covered with white cloth. The graves an on a platform of inlaid with white marble. A ten feet high screen of red porphyry surrounds them. Nasir Jang's tomb is on the left. It is surrounded by small scolloped arches of red porphyry.

=== Bani Begum’s Makbara ===
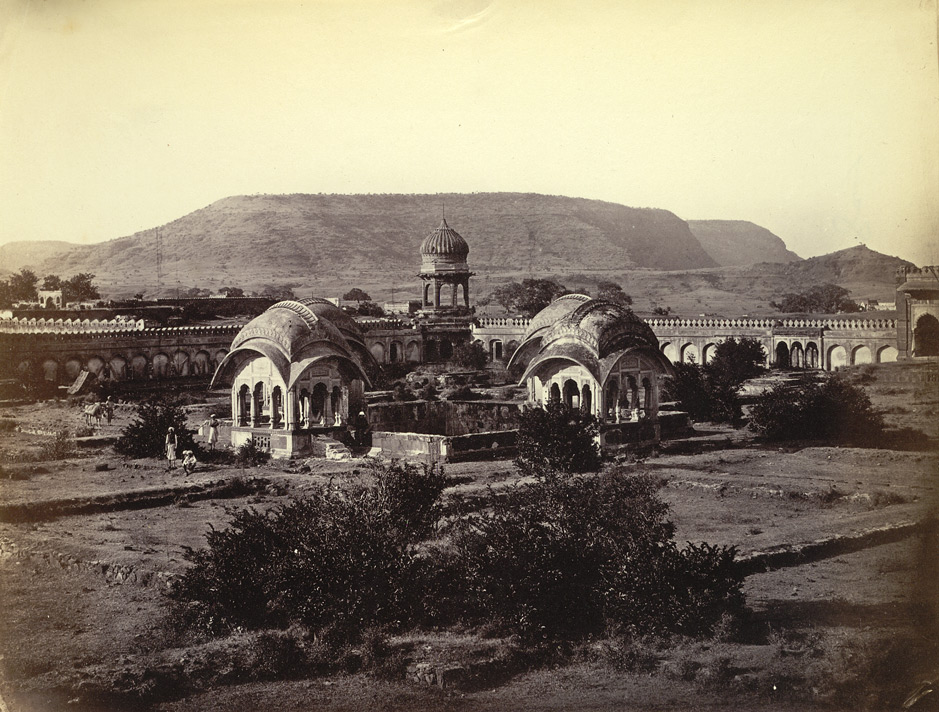
Banu Begum Garden, 1860s

To the west of this group of tombs is the Makbara of Bani Begum, the consort of one of Aurangzeb's son, with the Lall Bagh of Khan Jahan close by. The tomb of Bani Begam is in the centre of a large quadrangular garden. It is surrounded by a handsome wall with arched recesses on the inside. An elegant kiosk at each corner angle stands on eight pillars, and is surmountedby an Indo-Saracenic dome, fluted externally. The main entrance is in the centre of the north wall, and a mosque is in the south wall; while a corresponding open pavilion is in each of the remaining walls. The ground inside is laid out in the usual form of a garden, and contains cisterns and fountains, no longer in working order. The tomb of the Begum is within another walled enclosure in the middle of the garden, and has four small minarets around it. A pretty summer house in the centre of each wall in this wound enclosure, has sixteen slender but elegant pillars, supporting a domed roof in the curious form belonging to the Bengal style. There are, also specimens of perforated stone-work in the makbara.

=== Khan Jahan’s Lall Bagh ===
The Lall Bagh was built by Aurangzeb's foster-brother Khan Jahan, who was on two occasions Viceroy of the Dakhan, and died about the end of the 17th century. It resembles the garden containing Bani Begam's makbara, but is smaller, and has similar corner towers. The centre of each side wall has a building, one of which forms the gate, and contains a large dome in the centre, with a smaller dome on either side, add three minarets. A cistern in the centre of the enclosure, is connected by four long cisterns with the building in the middle of each wall; and the whole is adorned with fountains. "The water supply is obtained from the Roza tank, and first fills a cistern on the top of an adjoining house, from which it runs down a sloping pavement, into the garden." The makbara of Khan Jahan is just above the garden, and the tombs of his relations are on the western side. A red porphyritic trap, and a cement of the same colour, have been used in the buildings, and hence the name Lall Bagh which has been given to the garden.

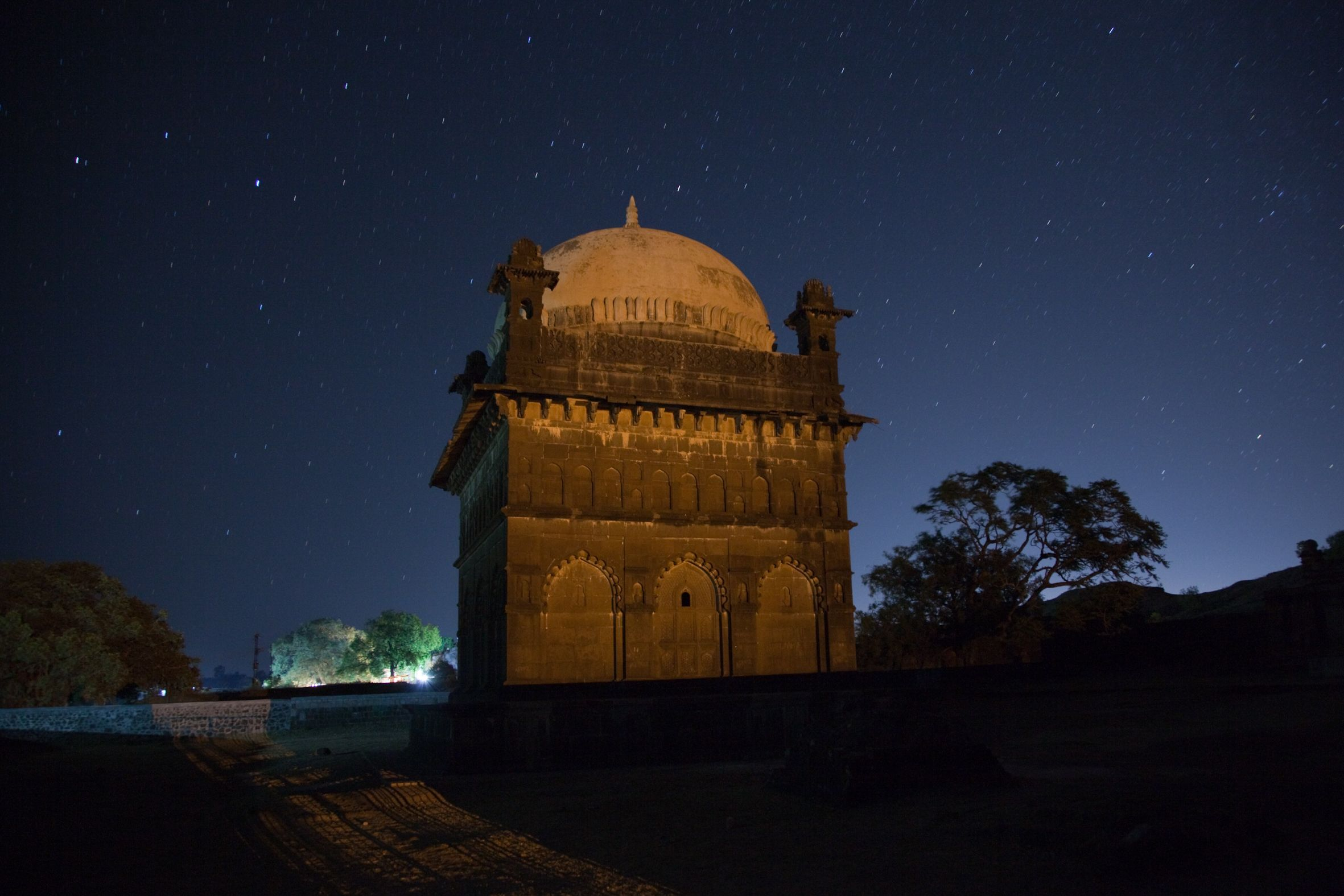
Tomb of Malik Ambar

=== Malik Ambar's Tomb ===
Malik Ambar's dargah is to the north-west of the town and according to Ferishta it was erected during his lifetime. Nearby stands the tomb of his wife Bibi Karima. They are both in the Parther style of architecture and stand on raised platforms. The larger of the two contains the mortal remains of Malik Ambar and resembles Nizam Shah's dargah. Though the smaller is also of the same general appearance, it does not have the facade decorated with recesses and cusped arches in stucco plaster. At a short distance from Malik Ambar's tomb is the open tomb of Tana Shah, the last of the Golkonda kings. To the north of the town is the tomb of Nizam Shah Bhairi which was converted into a trvelles' bungalow by the officers of the contingent stationed at Aurangabad during British days. The mausoleum at the base of the hill close by was erected for himself by Khoja Firoz while engaged in building the tomb of Nizam Shah Bhairi. The dargah of Ahmad Nizam Shah (1489–1509) is built on a raised platform and has an open court all round. It is quadrangular in plan, the walls rising high and plump with the parapet. A projecting string course divides the facade into two portions, the lower of which has three compartments on each face. Each compartment again has a rectangular recess covered by a horse-shoe arch. A cornice above projects well, and is supported on brackets. The parapet is pierced with tracery work; and the corner support little kiosks which look like miniature dargahs. While the summit is crowned with a little drum, the lower portion of the dome is adorned with lotus leaves.

=== Zar Zari Zar Bakhsh and Ganj Rawan Ganj Baksh Dargah ===
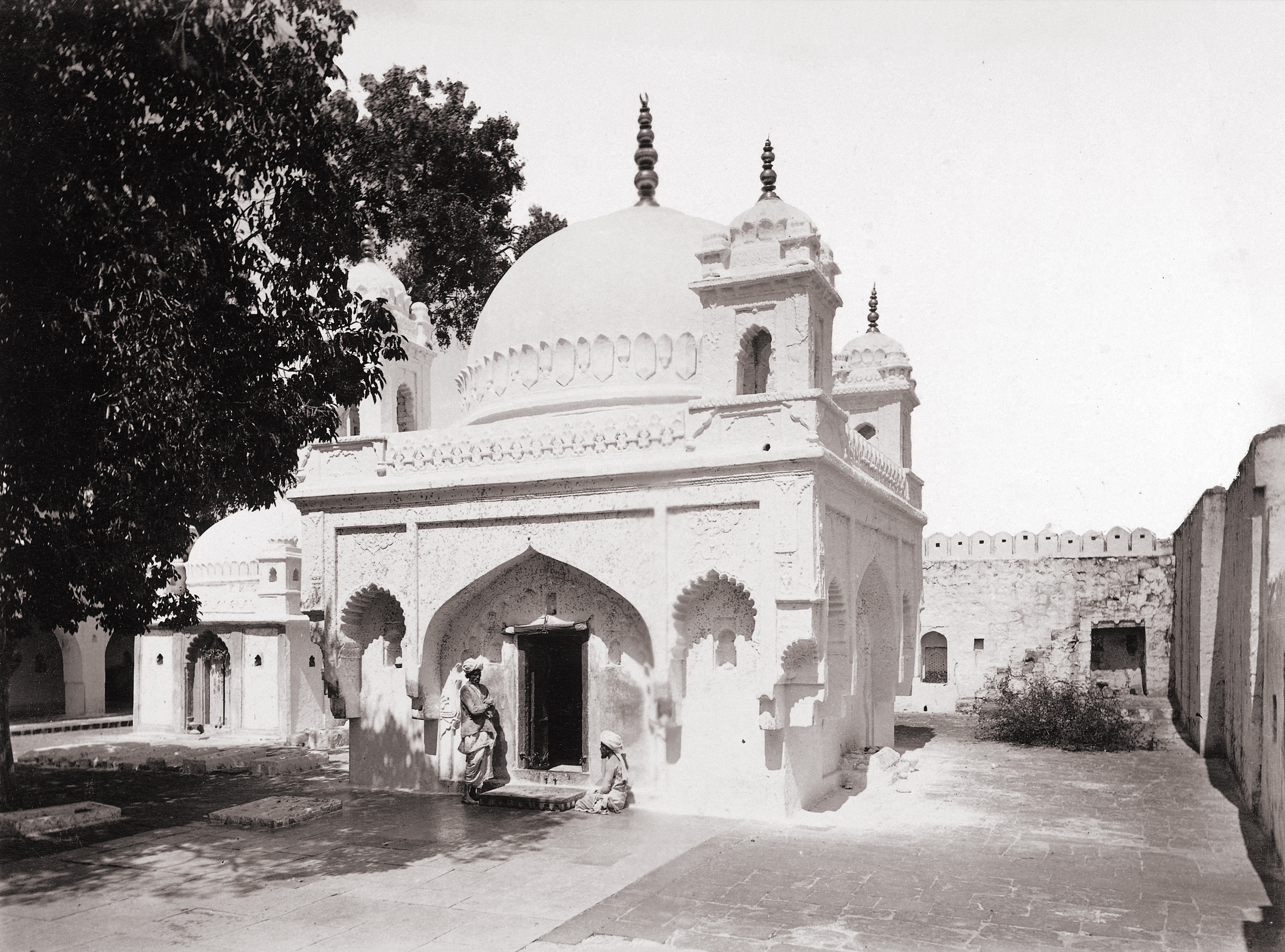
Tomb of Zar Zari Zar Baksh, 1890s

The tomb of Zar Zari Baksh is between Malik Ambar's tomb and the northern gate of the town. It contains a number of ornaments and relics, the most remarkable of which is a circular looking-glass of steel mounted on a steel pedestal of four feet in height. It is said to have been presented by king Tana Shah.

To the west of the town is the mausoleum of Ganj Ravan Ganj Baksh, believed to be the earliest Islamic saint of the district. He arrived towards the end of the 13th century about the time of Ala-ud-din's invasion of Devagiri. His dargah has the horse-shoe shaped dome of the Pathans, with piers on the faces supporting pointed arches. It stands on the band of Pari-ka-talav, also known as Ganj Ravan Talav. On the same side of the town is that of Sayyad Khalksar with a fine tank attached to it.

The mausoleums of Abdal Halim and Kak Shahr, situated to the south of Khuldabad have some old pillars probably taken from the ruins of abandoned Hindu temples. A number of other decayed tombs are to the east and south of the town.

On the anniversary day of the death of Zar Zari Zar Baksh an urus lasting for eight days is held. The articles exposed for sale consist of saris, brass and copper vessels and toys, including cutlery articles. The fair is attended by many people.

== Notable burials ==
Notable saints and rulers buried at Khuldabad:

- Burhan-ud-din Gharib (1337)
  - Tombs of Ruknuddin and Majd ud din, and many disciples of Bhuranuddin
  - Nizam ul Mulk Asaf Jah (1748), the first Nizam, and his wife Sayyida-un-nisa Begum
  - Nasir Jung (1750), the second Nizam, and his wife
  - Hidayat Muhi-ud-din Khan Muzaffar Jang (1751), the third Nizam
  - A number of other dignitaries including Iwaz Khan (1730), Mutawasil Khan, uncle of Muzaffar Jung, Jamal ud din Khan (1746), Shah Karim ud din, Shahzada Jangli, and Saeed ud din Suam (III), the taluqdar of Aurangabad
  - Bani Begum in a garden, Khan Jahan and Saad ullah Khan in Lal Bagh
- Zainuddin Shirazi (1369)
  - Maulana Khan Bibi, adoptive daughter of Zainuddin Shirazi
  - Tombs of his disciples such as Shama ud din Fazal ullah, Muhammad Lashkar, and Mir Hasan
  - Aurangzeb (1707)
  - Muhammad Azam Shah and his wife Aurangi Bibi
  - Sayyid Mansur Mughal, governor of Baglana, and his wife
- Jalal ud din Ganj Rawan
- Muntajib ud din Zar Zari Zar Baksh (1309)
  - Inside the Dargah complex:
    - Bibi Hajra, mother of Burhan-ud-din and Muntajib ud din
    - Sona Bai, Hindu princess
    - Tombs of their relatives and Burhan-ud-din's disciples, such as Farid ud din Adib (1337) and Pir Mubarak Karwan (1340)
  - West of Dargah complex:
    - Badr ud din Nawlakha
    - al-Habib al-Sayyid Abdullah Al-Aydarus (1631)
    - Malik Ambar (1626)
    - Siddi Karima, wife of Malik Ambar
    - Siddi Abdul Rehman, grandson of Malik Ambar
  - East of the Dargah Complex:
    - Ankas Khan, a noble of Tughlaq period
    - Mumtaz Khan
- Sayyid Yusuf al Husain Raju Qatal (1330), Dargah north of Huda Hill
  - Inside the dargah complex:
    - Sayyid Chandan Sahib
    - Abul Hasan Tana Shah (1699), the last of Qutub Shahi kings
    - Nawab Marhamat Khan, Mughal Governor of Aurangabad
    - Daud Khan (1715), Mughal Governor of Bhuranpur, his brothers and sisters
  - North of the Dargah complex:
    - Mosque of 1400 Saints, contains graves of scholars such as Zahir ud din Bhakkari
    - Ahmad Nizam Shah (1508), first king of Ahmednagar Sultanate
    - Bhuran Nizam Shah (1553), second King of Ahmednagar Sultanate
- Amir Hasan Dihlawi Sijzi (1336)
  - Azad Bilgrami (1786)
- Khwja Husain (1349) and Khwja Umar, uncle of Zainuddin Shirazi, south of Huda Hill
- Bibi Aisha, daughter of Farid ud din Ganj Shakkar, south of Hasan Dihlawi Tomb
- Shah Khaksar, southwest of Ganj Rawan's tomb
- Near Daulatabad:
  - Momin Arif.
  - Mardan ul din (1335)
  - Nizam ud din Pesh Imam (1370), at Kaghzipura
  - Alauddun Ziya
  - Baha ud din Ansari (1515)

== See also ==
- Sufi Saints of Aurangabad
- Zar Zari Zar Baksh
- Khwaja Zainuddin Shirazi
- Sayyid Burhan-ud-din
- Ganj Rawan Ganj Baksh
- Aurangabad
- Aurangabad Tourism Capital of Maharashtra
