= Bhadra Maruti Temple =

Hindu temple in Khuldabad, Sambhajinagar district, Maharashtra, India

Bhadra Maruti Mandir
- Bhadra Maruti
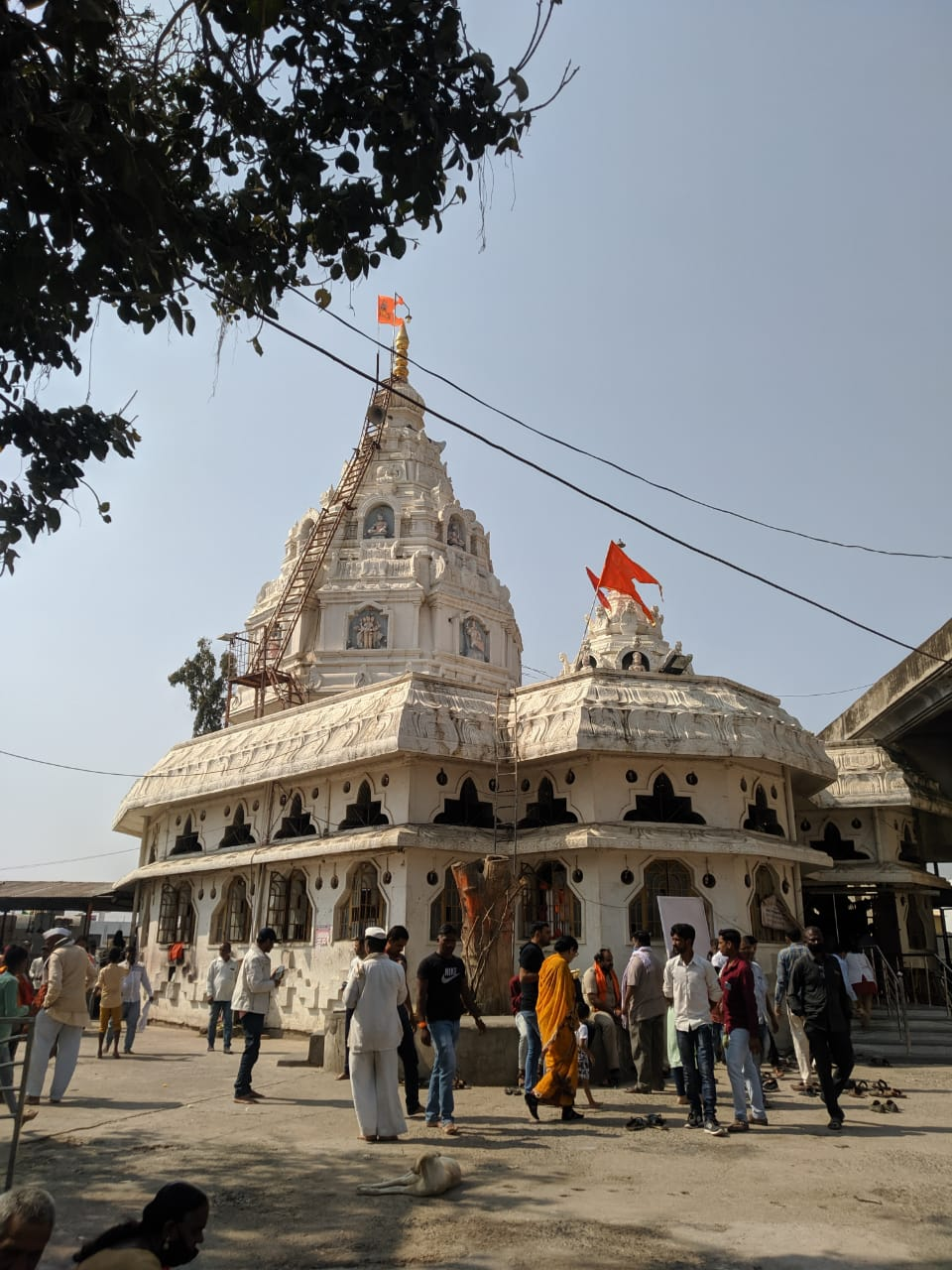
- Bhadra Maruti Temple side view

- Bhadra Maruti mandir in Maharashtra

Religion
- Affiliation: Hinduism
- District: Chhathrapathi Shambhaji Nagar
- Deity: Hanuman
- Festivals: Hanuman Jayanti; Ram Navami
- Ecclesiastical or organizational status: Active
- Governing body: Bhadra Maruti sansthan
- Status: Active

Location
- Location: Khuldabad (Chhatrapati Sambhajinagar)(Old Aurangabad of MAharashtra State)
- State: Maharashtra
- Country: India
- Interactive map of Bhadra Maruti Mandir
- Coordinates: 20°00′34″N 75°11′47″E

Architecture
- Completed: 1960s

Specifications
- Temple: One
- Materials: White marbel
- Elevation: 725 m (2,379 ft)

The Bhadra Maruti Temple is a Hindu temple in Khuldabad, Maharashtra, India. The deity of the temple is Lord Hanuman

It is located on a distance of 4 km from the Ellora Caves.

At the temple, the murti of Hanuman is portrayed in a reclining or sleeping posture. It is one of only three places where Hanuman is represented in a sleeping posture. The second noted place is a temple on the banks of Ganga at sangam in Prayagraj, Uttar Pradesh and the third is at Jam Sawali, Madhya Pradesh.

The Bhadra Maruti Temple is one of the famous tourist attraction and pilgrimage centers in Chhatrapati Sambhajinagar district. Annually, n the auspicious occasions of Hanuman Jayanti and Ram Navami, lakhs of devotees arrive at the mandir, and people from Aurangabad and nearby villages walk to the temple to take darshan and do puja–aarti of lord Bajrangbali. Also, Devotees visit it on Saturdays in the Hindu calendar month of "Shraavana" Usually there is rush and lots of crowd during Saturdays and Tuesdays in the mandir every week.

== History ==
In medieval times, when the region where this mandir is situated was won by Mughal the mandir was destroyed. It is said that however the Murti was saved, and some people successfully kept it hidden for lots of years. In the 1960s, some people started the movement to relocate the Murti to its original location. They built a mandir made up of marbal stones.

== Folklore ==
According to folklore, in ancient times the Khuldabad was known as Bhadravati, and the ruler was a noble king named Bhadrasena, who was an ardent devotee of Rama and used to sing songs in His praise. One day Hanumanji descended in the place, listening to the devotional songs sung in praise of Rama. He was mesmerized and, without his knowledge, took a reclining posture called 'Bhava-samadhi' (Bhavava samadhi is a yogic posture). King Bhadrasen, when he had finished his song, was astonished to find Hanuman in Samadhi before him. He requested Hanuman to reside there forever and bless his and Lord Rama's devotees.

There is another folklore interwoven with the history of the popular saint, ShriSwami Samarth Ramdas. It is believed that it was the saint ShriSwami Samarth Ramadas who discovered the reclining posture of Lord Hanuman. The meaning of 'Bhadra' means auspicious, and Maruti means another name of 'Lord Hanuman.' Hence, it is named "Bhadra Maruti." Thus the folklore has different legacies in different timelines, and both are accepted locally.

== Architecture ==
The architecture of the temple is quite unique with the blend of north Indian and south Indian styles of architecture. This unique and captivating ambience allows tourists to explore both forms of architecture simultaneously. There are also shires built for Lord Ram, Lord Lakshman, and Lord Sita. These shrines are built beside the main shrine with the reclining posture of Lord Hanuman.
