= Sikandar Ali Wajd =

Coordinates: 19°53′21.12″N 75°19′23.52″E

- Born: 1914; Aurangabad
- Died: 1983 (aged 68–69); Aurangabad
- Occupation: Poet
- Writing career
- Pen name: Wajd
- Genre: Ghazal,

Sikandar Ali Wajd (1914–1983) was a talented Urdu poet from Aurangabad, Maharashtra India. He had equal proficiency in composing gazals and poems.

== Professional life ==
He was born on 22 January 1914, in Aurangabad. In 1935, he was selected for Hyderabad Civil Service. Later he was appointed as Munsif Magistrate in Judicial Service. At the time of his retirement, he was a sessions judge. In the year 1972, he was elected to the Rajya Sabha (upper house of parliament) from Maharashtra State.

== Literary works ==
He was President of the Anjuman Taraqqi-i-Urdu, Maharashtra and was awarded Padma Shri in 1970 for his literary services. Pandit Jawaharlal Nehru released Wajd's third collection "Awarq-e-Mussavar". Prior to this collection his other poetical works 'Laho-Tarung', 'Aftab-e-Taza' and 'Bayaz-e-Maryan' were published in 1944,1952 and 1974 respectively. He was well versed in Urdu Persian and English. As he was gifted with a melodious voice, wherever he recited his gazals and poems, the audience listened to him in rapt attention. His poems ‘Ajanta’, ‘Ellora’, ‘Taj Mahal’, and ‘Karvan e Zindagi’ are well known.

He died on 16 June 1983 at Aurangabad. The Sikandar Ali Wajd Memorial Trust at Aurangabad is involved in promoting cultural and literary activities in the city, there is also an auditorium near Town Hall built in the memory of the poet. His wife continues to live at Jublee Park, Aurangabad.

== See also ==
- Wali Aurangabadi
- Siraj Aurangabadi
- Azad Bilgrami
- Urdu
- Urdu poetry
- List of Urdu language poets
- Padma Shri Awards (1970–1979)
