= Zar Zari Zar Baksh =

One of the earliest Sufis of the Chishti Order

Coordinates: 20°0′50.18″N 75°11′9.83″E

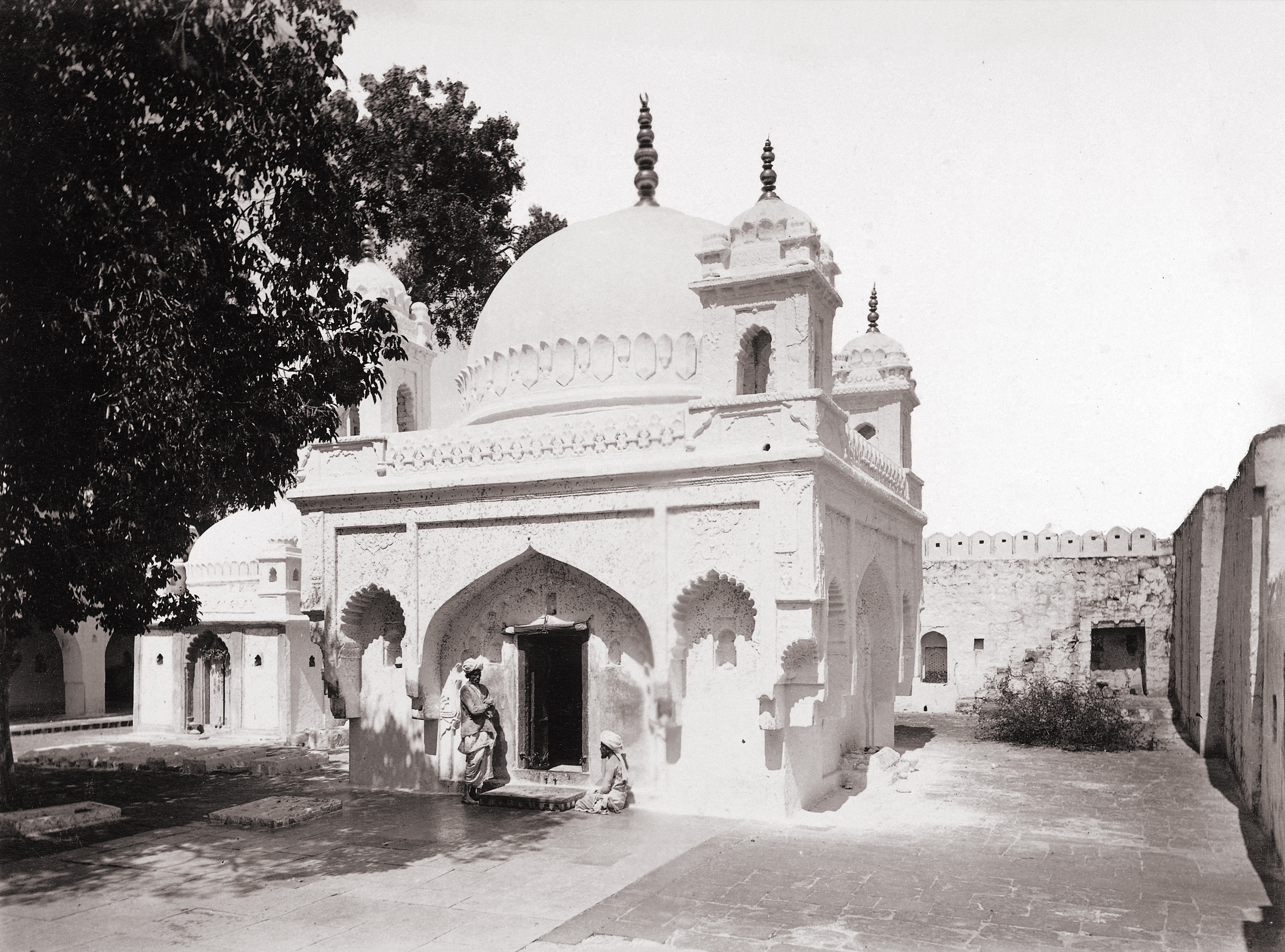
Zar Zari Zar Baksh Dargah Khuldabad 1890s

Zar Zari Zar Baksh (died 15 August 1309), or Shah Muntajab ud din, was one of the earliest Sufis of the Chishti Order, the most dominant of all the Sufi orders in the Indian subcontinent. He was sent to the Deccan by Nizamuddin Auliya of Delhi in the beginning of the 14th century. With 700 disciples, Zar Zari Zar Baksh came to Aurangabad, and is said to have converted a Hindu princess near a well at Khuldabad. The place is now called the "Sohan baoli" or "pleasing well", and the princess is buried close to the saints grave in Khuldabad.

The tomb of Zar Zari Zar Baksh is between Malik Ambar's tomb and the northern gate of the town. It contains a number of ornaments and relics, the most remarkable of which is a circular steel looking glass mounted on a steel pedestal of four feet in height. It is said to have been presented by King Tana Shah. The dargah in Khuldabad attracts thousands of pilgrims each year for the Urs of the saint. He was the Qutub-e-Irshad, or the highest of the five Qutubs in the spiritual hierarchy of his time, He was a "Master of the Universe" according to Meher Baba's map of consciousness.

== See also ==
- Ganj Rawan Ganj Baksh
- Khuldabad
- Khwaja Zainuddin Shirazi
- Sayyid Burhan-ud-din
- Sufi Saints of Aurangabad
