= Burhanuddin Gharib =

Indian Sufi Burhanuddin Gharib

Coordinates: 20°0′18.7″N 75°11′23.98″E

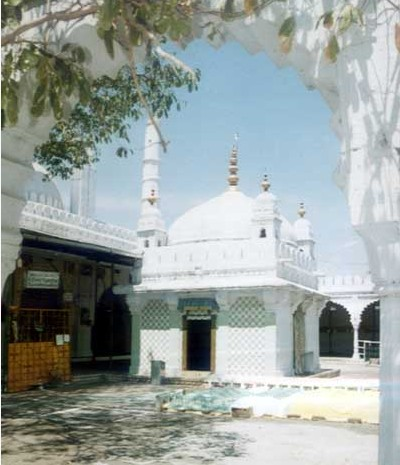
- Burahanuddin Dargah Khuldabad

Personal life
- Born: c. 1240
- Died: 1340 (aged 99–100) Khuldabad Sharif

Religious life
- Religion: Islam
- Order: Chisti order
- School: Chisti
- Profession: Sufi Saint

Senior posting
- Teacher: Nizamuddin Auliya
- Predecessor: Nizamuddin Auliya
- Successor: Zainuddin Shirazi
- Students: Khawaja Syed Zainuddin Daud Hussain Shirazi

Burhanuddin Gharib (d. 1340) was an Indian Sufi of the Chishti Order. He was one of the caliphs (spiritual successor) of the Sufi Saint Nizamuddin Awliya.

== Life ==
Burhanuddin Gharib was a disciple of Nizamuddin Auliya, a Sufi Saint of the Chishti Order. He was son of Sheikh Nasir-ud-Din Muhmud Hanswi. By some estimates, he was born in the year 1240 AD. His mother was the sister of the Sufi saint Jamal-ud-Din Hansvi. He was the elder brother of Muntajabbuddin Zar Zari Bakhsh.

He completed his earlier education in Hansi and then moved to Delhi to complete his education in formal religious sciences. He supervised the kitchen at the khanqah of Nizamuddin Awliya for a long time. Nizamuddin used to call him as 'Maulana Burhanuddin', out of respect. At one instance, Nizamuddin also referred to him as Bayazid Thani (Second), because of similarities with the famous Sufi Saint, Bayazid Bastami. He lived a life of celibacy.

He was popular among Nizamuddin's disciples for the respect he showed towards his teacher. Accordingly to authors of "Siyar-ul-Awliya" and "Khazinat-ul-Asfiya", Burhanuddin was endowed with the mantle and cap (the symbols of the spiritual successorship, Caliphate) to identify him as the successor to Nizamuddin Auliya.

Burhanuddin was a close friend of many of Nizamuddin Auliya's famous spiritual disciples, such as Amir Khusrau, Nasiruddin Chiragh Dahlavi, and Amir Hasan Sijzi. Burhanuddin allowed Samaa and rejoicing as spiritual expressions at his convent.

When Sultan Muhammad Bin Tughluq moved the capital from Delhi to Daulatabad intermittently, Burhanuddin moved to Daulatabad, where he spent most of the remaining years of his life. He later left for Roza (present-day Khuldabad) towards the last days of his life, before dying in 741 AH / 1340 AD.

== Legacy ==
Burhanuddin's sayings were captured by his disciple Maulana Muhammad Bin Ahmad Kashani in the form of Ahsan-ul-Aqwal. He designated Zainuddin Shirazi as his spiritual successor. Burhanuddin's Urs (death anniversary) is celebrated on 8th - 12th of the Islamic month of Safar.

When the sovereign Nasir ud din Nasir Khan Faruki of the Faruki dynasty of Kandesh captured Asirgarh in 1399 CE, the town of Burhanpur on the bank of Tapti was founded in honor of Burhanuddin.

The dargah has a large quadrangular courtyard, featuring an open-fronted building on all sides and a Naqqar khana at the east end. The west end of the quadrangle is used as a school, and a door gives access to an inner courtyard containing several graves. Facing the entrance is the tomb of Burhanuddin. Within the shrine are preserved some hairs of the Prophet's beard. The shrine doors are plated with metal plates wrought into fanciful designs of trees and flowers. There is a mosque in front of the dargah. The dargah attracts thousands of pilgrims each year for the Urus of the saint.

=== Nizam-ul-Mulk Asaf Jah's tomb ===
To the right of Burhanuddin's tomb are the resting places of Nizam-ul-Mulk Asaf Jah I, the founder of the Hyderabad dynasty, his second son Nasir Jang, and one of his consorts. They are covered with a white cloth.

== See also ==
- Nizams of Hyderabad
- Ganj Rawan Ganj Baksh
- Khuldabad
- Zainuddin Shirazi
- Sufi Saints of Aurangabad
- Zar Zari Zar Baksh
- Ashraf Jahangir Semnani
