= Tadhkirah (Ahmadiyya) =

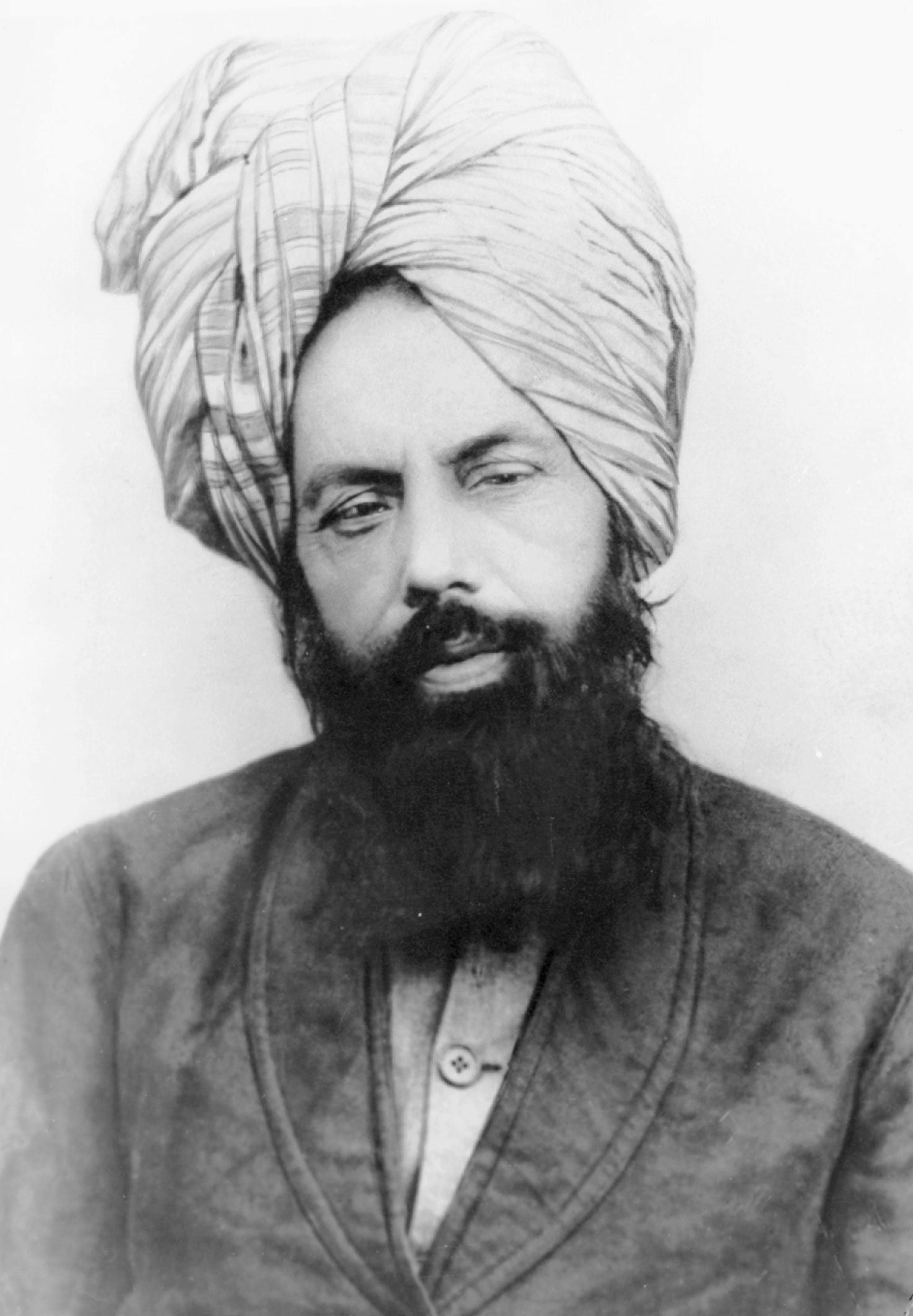
Mirza Ghulam Ahmad (13 February 1835 – 26 May 1908), a religious figure from India, and the founder of the Ahmadiyya movement.

Tadhkira (تذکرة) is a collection of the revelations, dreams and visions of Mirza Ghulam Ahmad, founder of the Ahmadiyya Muslim Community. The English rendering of the Urdu, Arabic and Persian text was initially done by Sir Chaudry Muhammad Zafarullah Khan in 1976. The present revised edition has been published in 2019 under the auspices of Mirza Masroor Ahmad, Imam and Head of the Worldwide Ahmadiyya Muslim Community, fifth successor to Mirza Ghulam Ahmad, by Islam International Publications Ltd.

== Dreams, visions and revelations ==
The Quran claims that true dreams, visions and verbal revelations are a bounty of God and descend from him. The Quran claims these experiences are signs of the existence of God. All human beings are potentially capable of these experiences.

== God speaks to man ==
The main theme of this collection is to testify the Quran's claim that God speaks to man. It is explained that God may speak to man in at least three different ways; direct verbal revelation, from behind a veil, and by sending a messenger. In Tadhkira, we find examples of all three kinds of Revelations. Mirza Ghulam Ahmad claims that, although every human being has the inbuilt potential to be the recipient of divine revelations, it is the hallmark of a true believer that God may speak to him.

== Revelation and prophecy ==
It is claimed that God is the possessor of knowledge of the hidden and the unknown, this is the basis of Mirza Ghulam Ahmad's claim that divine revelations contain news of the hidden, beyond the reach of human beings. Mirza Ghulam Ahmad's dreams and visions, along with his verbal revelational experiences have been put forth as proof of his claims to prophethood. This collection, Tadhkira, is replete with such prophecies.
