= Zainuddin Shirazi =

14th-century Sufi saint

Coordinates: 20°0′18.54″N 75°11′29.33″E

Hazrat Khwaja Syed Shah Maqdoom Zain-ud-din Davud ibn Hussain Shirazi is a Sufi saint of the Deccan, belonging to the Chishti Order.

== Syed Zainuddin's life ==
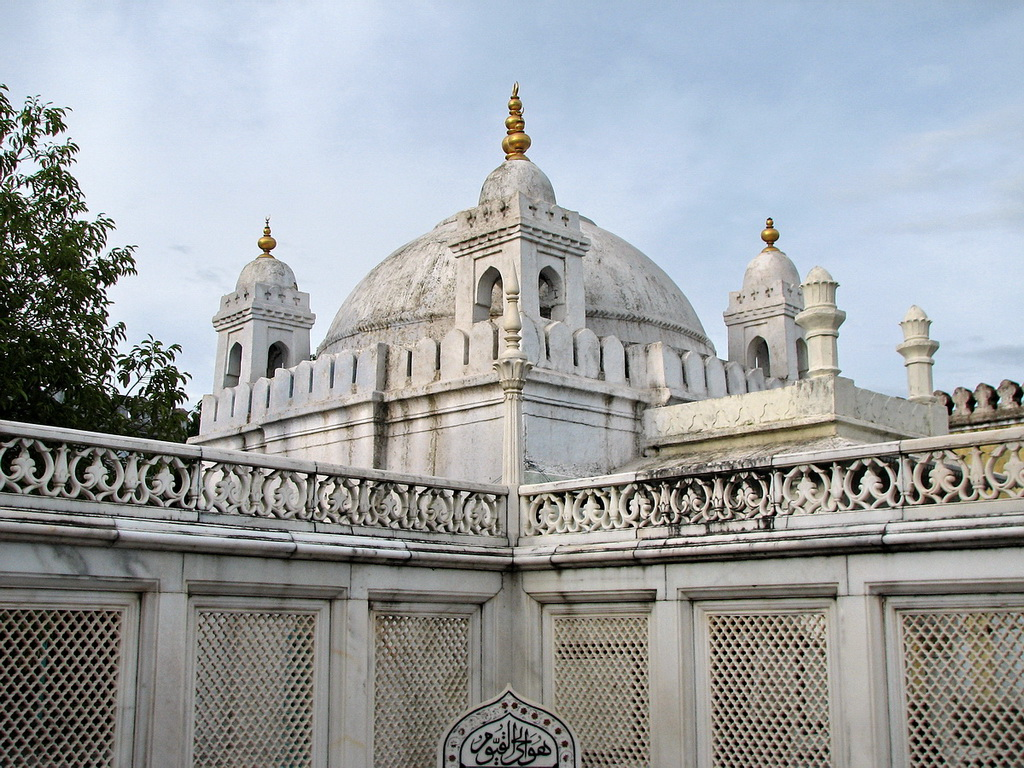
Zainuddin Shirzai's Maqbara at Khuldabad

Syed Zain ud din Davud (*Hijri 701/1302 CE, † Hijri 771/1370 CE) was born at Shiraz and went to Delhi by way of Mecca. He studied under Maulana Kamaluddin of Samana, and came with him to Daulatabad. The author of the "Mayrat-al Walayeh" mentions that Zainuddin, on his arrival at Daulatabad, disapproved of the singing and dancing in the convent of Burhan uddin; but when he visited the tekkieh, he was perfectly satisfied, and he and his companions were initiated in the Chishtia order. Syed Zainuddin held the office of "kazi" at Daulatabad, and in H. 737 (1336 CE) was invested with the mantle of the kaliphat, but did not actually succeed till after Burhan ud din's death in H. 741 (1340 CE). Syed Husain has recorded all the sayings of Zainuddin in his "Hidayat ul Kalul", and mentions that in H. 747 (1346 CE), sultan Muhammad bin Tughluq (H.699-H.752/1300-1351 CE) directed him to leave for Delhi with the other inhabitants. After the death of the sultan, his successor Firoz Shah permitted the saint to return to Daulatabad.

Zainuddin was greatly respected by the Bahmani king sultan Mahmud, who was first reproved by the saint for misgovernment. Malik raja the founder of the Faruki dynasty of Khandesh became one of Zainuddin's disciples, and when the next sovereign Nasir ud din Nasir Khan Faruki captured Asirgarh in H.801 / 1399 CE, Zainuddin went expressly from Daulatabad to Asirgarh, to tender his congratulations. It was to commemorate this visit that the town of Zainabad, on the left bank of the Tapti, was founded after him; and Burhanpur on the opposite bank was founded about the same time in honour of Burhan ud din.

Zainuddin died in H. 771 / 1370 CE, and a handsome mausoleum was erected over his tomb at Roza, which is visited by devout Musalmans of the Dakhan.

The relics of the "parahan" (the robe of the prophet) and "taj" given to Burhan ud din on succeeding to the kalifat, are carefully preserved in a wooden box placed in one of the apartments of Zainuddin's dargah.

Every year on the 12th Rabi-ul-awal, the sacred hair of the prophet is first shown to visitors, and then the "parahan", the "taj", and a few likenesses of some of the most sacred personages among the Muslims are exhibited.

The tombs of Azam Shah, of his Begum, and of a Muslim saint, are in a small enclosure to the east of Zainuddin's mausoleum; while Mughal Emperor Aurangzeb's tomb lies to the west. Opposite this last is a large quadrangular courtyard, having open-fronted buildings on all sides, and a "naqqar khana" or musical drum hall at the east end. The west end is used as a school where the Qur'an is taught, and gives access to an inner courtyard which contains a number of graves. Facing the entrance is the shrine of Burhan ud din; and a little to the right is the last resting-place of Nizam-ul-Mulk Asaf Jah I, the founder of the Hyderabad dynasty and of one of his consorts. To the left is the tomb of Nasir Jang, the son of Asaf Jah, who at one time contemplated rebellion against his father, but overcome by contrition for his conduct, performed penance at the tomb of saint Zainuddin.

The Dargah in Khuldabad attracts thousands of pilgrims each year from 12th Rabi-ul-awal, for the Urs of the saint.

== Malfoozat (sayings) of Zainuddin Shirazi ==
=== Hidayatul quloob ===
Hidayat ul Quloob: Malfoozat Khwaja Zainuddin Shirazi

=== Habbatul Muhabbat ===
These Malfoozat are recorded by Amir Ala Hasan Sanjari, famous poet and author of his time who has also recorded malfoozat of Nizamuddin Auliya, Delhi titled as Fawaydul Fawad. He is also resting in Khuldabad.

== See also ==
- Khuldabad
- Sufi Saints of Aurangabad
- Zar Zari Zar Baksh
- Ganj Rawan Ganj Baksh
