= Khwaja Habib Ali Shah =

Indian Shah

Shah Deccan Qutub Kokan Pir Khaja Habib Ali Shah Chisti ul Quadri Naqshbandi
- Born: Sunday, 20 Jamadi ul Thani 1236H (25 March 1836G); Hyderabad Deccan, India
- Died: Thursday, 6th Dhul Hijjah 1323H (01 February 1906G), Khanqah Habibia Dockyard Road, Bombay, India, Buried on 10th Dhul Hijjah 1323H after salat Idd Al-Adha at Ahmed Bagh, Katalmandi, Hyderabad, India.
- Other name: Born as Habib Yarkhan Siddiqui "Habib" (Pen Name)
- Title: Shah Deccan, Qutub Konkan

Shah Deccan Qutub Konkan Hazrat Pir Hafiz Khaja Habib Ali Shah ra (25 March 1836 – 1 February 1906) was an Indian Sufi, whose lineage is traced back to Abu Bakr, the first Caliph of Islam.

== Early life ==
His birth was allegedly foretold by the Sheikh himself, who remarked that "his" son would be born in the home of Nawab Ahmad Yar Khan. At this stage the mother of Khaja Habib, Amatul Fatima ra was beyond child-bearing age, but since the sheikh had spoken, they believed that Allah willed otherwise.

In a couplet in Diwan Habib, Khaja Habib Ali Shah exhibited love for his Sheikh Mohammed Hafiz Ali Shah Khairabadi ra the parental nobility and worldly life. In his discourses he explained that the love and respect for the Sheikh the spiritual master.

"Kar Habib Apne Pidr aur na Madr pe Ghoooror, Ishq mein falan ibn falan haach hai haach"

English Translation of the Urdu couplet:

"On your ancestry Habib be not proud aught. In the path of love So-and-So, is naught, is naught"

As predicted by Hafiz Pir Dastagir two years later, a male child was born as the fourth child of Nawaab Ahmad Yar Khan, as family tradition who was named Habib Yar Khan. In Hagiography "Tadhkiratul Habib" (memorial of the beloved) by Moulana Hafiz Muhammed Fuzail Bhayat Soofie Al Habibi, Durban, South Africa reported that at the time of the birth of Khwaja Habib a majzub stood at the door of the home in Kuch-e-Nasim Sultan (located near Machli Kaman near Charminar, Hyderabad) the palace of Nawab Ahmed Yar Khan (Mohi ud dowla), and pacing the floor in ecstasy repeatedly uttered "Shaykh Paida Shud" (English Translation: Sheikh has born)." According to the science of Abjad, the year of the birth of Khaja Habib Ali Shah is "Ya Sayyid Habib Ali Shah Chishti"

Four years later, the grand Sheikh Hafiz Mohammed Ali Shah Kharaibadi visited Hyderabad. He knowingly enquired from Nawab Ahmed Yar Khan, "Well, well was not my child born at your home?" Nawaab Ahmed Yar Khan replied "Yes". Hafiz Pir Dastagir asked, "Well have you named him"? The Nawaab sahib replied in the affirmative. "What have you named him?" asked the Sheikh. The Nawaab sahib replied, "Habib Yar Khan Bahadur". Hafiz Pir Dastagir was very pleased and said, "I have come to perform the Bismillah (Tasmi khani) ceremony of my son". On 23 Shawal 1240 AH at the age of four years four months and four days, Hafiz Pir proceeded with the Bismillah of the child and thereafter put the child on test. A handful of gold coins and a handful of sweetmeats were placed in front of the child and he was asked by the Sheikh to choose that which he desired. The child (Khwaja Habib) placed his hands on both and said, "I will take both!". Upon this Hafiz Pir Dastagir smiled knowingly and declared, "My child will choose spirituality over wealth, and will be a wealth of spirituality"!.

After the official Bismillah ceremony, Khwaja Habib imitated the actions of his beloved Sheikh by learning and memorizing the verses, meanings and ultimately the secrets of the Quran.

== Discipleship ==
Hazrat Khaja Pir Khwaja Habib Ali Shah ra became the disciple *baith* of Hazrat Khaja Mohammed Ali Shah Khairabadi ra, a Caliph of Hazrat Khaja Suleman Tawsawi ra. Later bestowed with Khilafat in Silsila Hafizia, Suleimani, Nizamia, Chishtiya-ul-Quadri.

== Education and training ==
At this tender age Khaja Habib formally began the process of acquiring external as well as internal knowledge. By the age of six, Khaja Habib would retire to the garden house, in a state of wudu, facing qiblah, covering his face with a cloth and would indulge in Muraqabah, in total privacy. By the age of nine, Khwaja Habib made it a consistent practice to be in a state of wudu.

An anecdote narrated by several of his family members and Caliphas: During Id, Khaja habib's father would listen to the requests of his children as to what they desired as gifts (iddi) on the occasion of happiness/id. When it came to the turn of Khwaja Habib tears would roll down his eyes and he would weep and request "My dear father, whenever you visit the Khaqah of my beloved Pir-o-Murshid (Sheikh){Hafiz Pir Dastagir}, grant me the privilege of accompanying you.".

After studying the Quran and the acquisition of the basic knowledge of Shariat, Khaja Habib was formally initiated into Tariqa by Al Marifah Hafiz Mohammed Ali Shah (Hafiz Pir Dastagir) Khairabadi. Khaja Habib took the bayath on the hands of his Pir at the age of sixteen years six months and eleven days on 30 Moharram ul Haram 1252 H. In one of the verses in Habibul Talibun Khaja Habib explains the feelings As:

"Hum ko Hafiz ki Gali ka woh taswur banddha, Showk Janat na raha bagh Irum bhool gaye"

English Translation of the Persian couplet:

"In the thought of Hafiz's alley I was so lost, Desire for heaven, the Gardens of Irum I forgot"

Khaja Habib Ali Shah in his own words reported by his Calipha Shah Mohammed Ibrahim Soofie Habibi (whose Dargah Shareef is at Ajmer Shareef India). After Bayat I persistently requested from my parents to send me to the Khanqah of my Sheikh Hazrat Hafiz Pir Dastagir, but would receive no response from them. During that period a group of my spiritual brothers (Pir Bhais) was planning to visit the Sheikh in Khairabad. I secretly sent a petitionary letter by the hand of Hazrat Mirza Sardar Baig Hafizi Sahib (whose Dargah Shareef is in Agha Pura, Hyderbad, India).

When the entourage arrived in Khairabad, Hafiz Pir Dastagir was conducting a lesson. The entourage kissed his feet and musfah Hafiz Pir Dastagir adjourned the class (lesson) and asked whether all was well. Everyone replied in the affirmative, having completely forgotten about the letter in the excitement of their arrival at the Khanqah of their Pir. Finally, Hafiz Pir Dastagir himself was compelled to ask, "Is there anything else? Is there no letter for me?" At that moment my letter came to mind and was presented to Hafiz Pir Dastagir. It is narrated that Hafiz Pir came forward, took the letter placed it on his head, held it to his chest, and wept profusely. After a while Hafiz Pir Dastagir regained his composure and opening his arms as if motioning to someone declared resolutely, "I will call him here "! The highlights of this incident stated in the following verse by Khwaja Habib in his diwan:

"Shukr kya uska baja laya Habib Assi - Ho gaya paesh nazar ye sag darban ka qat"

English Translation of the Persian couplet:

"How can gratitude be shown by Habib the sinner. Before his eyes was presented the lowly servant's letter"

The letter was taken and placed by Hafiz Pir Dastagir in his top pocket.

Khwaja Habib Ali Shah narrates in Diwan:

Naam sun ke wo Habib Ashiq Ka - Padh ke phir jaayb mein rakha Kagaz

English Translation of the Persian couplet:

Hearing the name of Habib the lover, In his pocket he kept the letter.

Khaja Pir Habib Ali Shah performed Hajj (in the year )

Khaja Pir Habib Ali Shah spent years in the presence of Khaja Hafiz Mohammed Ali Shah Kharaibadi, in order to learn and gain the spiritual benefits (manasik). Ultimately, he was bestowed with the vision by the karam of Allah.

== Poetry ==
He wrote poetry in several languages: Hindi, Urdu, Persian, Kokani. His poetry of Hindi, Persian and Urdu is still sung by Qawals. His poetry contains homage to his Pir (Master) and other Sufi Saints of his order such as Shaikh Abdul Qadir Jilani and Khawajah Moinuddin Chishti of Ajmer, India.

== Works ==
Hazrat Pir Khaja Hafiz Habib Ali shah ra authored 30+ books in different languages but now being translated in Urdu and English by his disciples and available in market.

He designed syllabus and methodology for the teachings in Khanqas which are still practiced and admired. A possible module of “Theoretical Tasawwauf” could read like this and then a practical approach is done by the Pir (master) himself for disciples (Mureedin).

- Aqidah of Ahl Al Sunnah wal Jamaa’h

Dealing particularly with the contentious issues such as Tasawassul, Nida, Nadhr, Visitation of the Tombs of Awliay Allah, Urs of Awliay Allah are well defined in Habibul Inam.

- The Etiquette of Discipleship:

Respect, character development, conviction (yaqin) in the Murshid (Master), proper modes of conduct, basic house rules at a deverish lodge are defined in Habib al Talibun

- Mujahada against the Nafs and Shaytan:

Fighting off evil suggestions, resistance to succumbing to the temptations of the ego, fighting carnal basal desires, anger management, evils of arrogance, envy, ostentation, backbiting, slander, gluttony, apathy, refraining from Haram (restricted actions of Islam), are some of the topics that “Habib un Nasf fi Raddil Khnnas” and “Habibul Inam” addresses.

- Character Building & Personality Development:

Beautifying one's demeanour, speech, actions, imbuing sincerity, humility, tolerance, compassion, concern for the welfare of others, gratitude, patience are all fundamental lessons that “Habibul Muridin” discusses.

- Spiritual Practices:

Litanies, Nafl Salah, prescribed prayers Adhkar, Ashgal, meditation (Muraqaba), and the method of its performance, pitfalls of and obstacles in the path are taught in “Habibil Awrad” and “Habibul Adhkar”.

- Mystic Poetry and Literature:

Besides Mathnawi of Moulana Rumi, Diwan-e-Habib, Habibul Irshad, Fawaid Al Fuad, Awarif al Marif are some of the books that were widely read and studied.

== Death and aftermath ==
Shah died at Bombay on Thursday 1 February 1906, in Dockyard Road, Majgown, Bombay, India.

His body was taken to Hyderabad for burial by Hafiz Ali Shah, his second son. Funeral took three days to reach Hyderabad railway station 3 February 1906 C.E. delay was due to multitudes of people that gathered at all railway stations along the route to pay their homage, respect and offer Salat ul Janaza for their Sheikh. At Hyderabad the funeral was received Pir Khaja Hidayat Ali Shah along with thousands of devotees and procession went to their home at Ghansi Bazar Hyderabad, India.

Salat ul Janaza was performed at renowned Makkah Masjid, Hyderabad, India, Masjid Ghansi Bazaar, Hyderabad, India, thousands of mourner(people) Muslims and non-Muslims, Mashaikhs, Ulemas, Scholars, Delegates from Nizam Government, Government Officials, students, disciples attended the funeral. Immediate after Eid Salat (Namaz) Idd Adha in Masjid Habib Ali Shah Katalmandi, again Namaz janaza (salatul Janaza) Monday, 10h Dhul Hijjah 1323H, (Monday, February 1906 C.E.) was performed led by his Pir-Bhai Moulana Hassan Uzzama Hafizi (RA) and buried at the spot he identified, in Kattalmandi then Ahmed Bagh, Hyderbad, India.

A tomb was built after few years of his demise, the design was given by one of his architect disciples for the Dargah Shareef (the same architect who designed Hyderabad High Court, now AP High Court) Inside the tomb, on the grave a marble Masri was built, on top of four sides the Darood Taj is engraved and at the foot (south side) Tariq wisal (demised date) is engraved as Thursday, 6th Dhul Hijjah 1323H, Thursday 1 February 1906 C.E.

== Silsila Habibia across the globe (worldwide) ==
Hyderabad, Telangana India

Sajjada Nasheen and Mutawalli Moulana Pir Khaja Habib Ali Shah Salis (Jawad Pasha Habibi) oversees all activities of the Dargah Shareef and manages the functioning of Masjid-e-Habibia. Hazrat Pir Ahsan Pasha Habibi, the calipha of Hazrat Pir Khawaja Habib Ali Shah Thani (RA), is actively involved in spreading the teachings of Islam and the principles of the Silsila Habibia Nizamia. He performs all rituals of the Dargah Shareef in the absence of the present Sajjada Nasheen.

Hundreds of devotees and disciples visit the shrine daily and require proper guidance and support. Madrasa Habibia, operated by the Habibi Education Society, functions within the Dargah premises. On the 6th (Chatti) and 19th (Unnis) of every Hijri month, Zikr and Sama are conducted from Asr to Maghrib and are open to all. Masjid Habib Ali Shah (RA) holds five daily prayers, Jumu’ah, and both Eid prayers (Iddain), and remains open to the public 24/7/365. On auspicious days and nights, special programs are conducted, including Shab Miraj, Shab Baraat, Milad Shareef, Gyarweeh Shareef, and others.

Throughout Ramadan, Tarawih prayers are held, and free Iftaar and dinner are provided at both the Masjid and Dargah Shareef for the general public, irrespective of religion, caste, or creed.

Academic Recognition Dr. Syed Mohammed Mohiuddin Habibi was awarded the Doctorate degree (Ph.D.) in 2024 by the world renowned Osmania University, Hyderabad, Telangana, India, for his research on the life, works, and services of Hazrat Pir Khaja Habib Ali Shah (RA) — Chishti ul Qadri, Naqshbandi, Soharwardi (RA).

Mumbai (erstwhile Bombay), Maharashtra, India

The Chilla Mubarak of Hazrat Khaja Pir Habib Ali Shah Chishti ul Qadri (RA) is located in Bombay (now Mumbai). Although his main Dargah Mazar (grave) is in Hyderabad, India, the place where he breathed his last is marked by a mausoleum built by his disciples in Mumbai. Over the past 100+ years, this small Khanqah, Chilla Mubarak, and Masjid (Madrasa) at Dockyard Road has served as a Markaz for numerous Islamic activities, benefiting people irrespective of caste, religion, or background.

Moulana Mohammed Hanif Gaya Sahib ra, the only son in law of Hazrat Khaja Habib Ali Shah Thani (RA), performed the rituals at the Khanqah in Dockyard Road for many years. His son, Baba Hasham Gaya, now continues these activities under the guidance of his mother. Monthly observances such as Chatti Shareef, Milad Shareef, and Gyaarweeh Shareef are commemorated at the Chilla Mubarak.

Ajmer, Rajasthan, India

Hazrat Soofie Ibrahim (RA), a calipha of Hazrat Khaja Habib Ali Shah (RA), was sent to Ajmer, where he lived and passed away in accordance with the instructions of Hazrat Khaja Habib (RA). His mazaar is located on a hillock adjacent to the Dargah Shareef.

Brother Syed Hidayat Ali Habibi ra, who is also a Khadim of Khaja Sahib Dargah Shareef, is responsible for the activities of the Silsila Habibia and the Dargah Shareef of Hazrat Soofie Ibrahim Shah. He provides guidance to all disciples of the Silsila Habibia Nizamia who visit Ajmer Shareef.

Moulvi Syed Firasat Hussain Habibi, from the Khudam Association of Sarkar Hazrat Khaja Syed Moinuddin Chishti Gharib Nawaz (RA), Ajmer, Rajasthan, India, is actively involved in the work of the Silsila Habibia. He assists the ziyarain visiting the Astaana Alia Gharib Nawaz (RA). He is the disciple (mureed) of Hazrat Pir Ahsan Pasha Habibi.

Ahmednager, Maharashtra, India

The city of Ahmednagar is home to the Dargah Shareef of the mureed and Khatim ul Khilafah of Hazrat Khaja Habib Shah Chishti Nizami (RA), known as Hazrat Khwajah Peer Sayed Badruddin Ali Shah Chishti (RA), and commonly referred to as Khwajah Sayed Faqir Muhammad Shah Chishti (رحمت الله علیه). He guided hundreds of thousands of people for the religion of islam. The Dargah Shareef is maintained by his family: • Sajjada Nasheen Hazrat Sayed Mehboob Ali Shah Chishti Nizami, • his children Sajjada Nasheen Hazrat Sayed Mohsin Ali Shah Chishti Nizami Habibi, • Peerzada Sayed Hafiz Ali Shah Chishti Nizami Habibi, and • Peerzada Sayed Asif Ali Shah Chishti Nizami Habibi.

The progeny of Khawaja Faqir Muhammad Shah (رحمت الله علیه) are the current custodians of the Chilla Mubarak in Ahmednagar, India. They continue to perform the regular activities of the Silsila Nizamia Habibia

Toronto, Canada

Moulana Pirzada Alhaj Haamed Pasha Siddiqui Habibi (also known as Haamed Yarkhan) is the son of Hazrat Khizr Pasha Siddiqui Habibi (RA), also known as Nawab Mujtaba Yarkhan, who was a calipha of Hazrat Maqdoom Pir Khaja Hafiz Ali Shah Sahib (RA). Haamed Pasha is a descendant, disciple, and calipha in the Silsila Habibia Nizamia, Chishti ul Qadri, Naqshbandi tradition.

He studied Arts and Law (BA LLB), majoring in Muslim Law, and pursued Tafseer of the Quran al Kareem under the close guidance of Hazrat Alhaj Qazi Ahmed Basheeruddin Farooqi Qadri (RA), a calipha of Hazrat Abdul Qadeer Siddiqui Hasrat (RA). He also received spiritual training from two of his paternal uncles, both renowned Sufia and Mashaikh of the recent past: • Hazrat Pir Khaja Habib Ali Shah Sani (RA) • Alhaj Hazrat Mehmood Pasha Qadri Takht Nasheen (RA)

Alhaj Haamed Pasha Sididiqi Habibi is the disciple mureed of his paternal uncle Hazrat Pir Khaja Habib Ali Shah Sani (RA). Hazrat Pir Ahsan Pasha Siddiqui Habibi granted him Caliphat Ijaza in September 2010 in the Silsila Hafezi, Nizami, Chishti, Qadri, and Naqshbandi traditions.

He continues his studies in Quranic Arabic Grammar with Moulana Arshad Basheer Madani. A bilingual speaker, he often delivers Jumu’ah Khutbah and Eidain prayers in Toronto, Canada. He actively serves the community in accordance with Sufi teachings of love, equality, and communal harmony, and performs the activities of the Silsila Habibia.

He is an active member of several organizations, including: • Khudame Aulia Canada • Islamic Will Canada • Bazme Nizamia Canada • Bazme Khawjagan • Budah Spiritual Association

He has delivered Khutbah‑e‑Nikah and performed du‘a at several weddings. In Toronto, he also participates in and leads the Khudame Aulia Study Circle Canada and the Islamic Will Group, helping community members prepare their will and power of Attorney documents at no cost.

In recognition of his services, Hazrat Sheikh Alhaj Pir Syed Aziz Nizami (RA), Sajjada Nasheen of Dargah Shareef Hazrat Syed Khaja Nizamuddin Mehboob Ilahi (New Delhi), honored him publicly with a shawl (Khirqa Mubarak — a form of Ijaza) during the Urs celebration of Mehboob Ilahi (RA) in Toronto, Canada, on Saturday, 13 March 2016. Video reference: https://www.youtube.com/watch?v=0lOBbjAujVI

Considering the services of Alhaj Haamed Pasha Siddiqui Habibi in Toronto, Hazrat Sufi Alhaj Syed Shah Murtaza Hussaini (Afsar Pasha), Sajjada Nasheen of Dargah Shareef Hazrat Shamsuddin Ghazi (RA), Osmanabad, India, bestowed upon him Caliphate (Ijaza) in numerous silsilas in Toronto, Canada.

South Africa

Hazrat Shah Goolam Muhammad Soofie Saheb (RA) was sent by Khwaja Habib Ali Shah (RA) to South Africa in 1895. There, he established twelve masaajid under the name “Habibia.” After his passing in 1911, his two eldest sons — Hazrat Shah Muhammad Ibrahim Shah Saheb Soofie and Hazrat Shah Abdul Aziz Dadajaan Soofie — served as Sajjada Nasheen of the Darbaar and continued the Habibi Silsila in South Africa. Numerous schools also operate under the umbrella of the Silsila Habibia in the region. [citation needed] Hazrat Shah Mufti Goolam Muhammad Soofie Salis Habibi is the current Sajjada Nasheen of the Darbaar of Hazrat Soofie Saheb and the Chishti Nizami Habibi Silsila in South Africa. He is assisted by two deputies: • Hazrat Shah Mufti Muhammad Farouq Soofie Siddiqi • Hazrat Shah Mufti Muhammad Ebrahim Soofie Siddiq [citation needed] The Chishti Habibiya Silsila is also carried forward by the progeny of Hazrat Khawaja Sayed Faqir Muhammad Shah under the banner of Bazm e Chiraag e Faqir Chishti International, founded by Hazrat Khawaja Sayed Mehboob Ali Shah Chishti Nizami Fakhri Sulemani Hafizi Habibi Faqiri RA who is buried in Cape Town. Currently, Bazm e Chiraag e Faqir Chishti International is led by: • Sajjada Nasheen Hazrat Sayed Mohsin Ali Shah Chishti Nizami Fakhri Sulemani Hafizi Habibi Faqiri Mehboobi • Peerzada Hazrat Sayed Hafiz Ali Shah Chishti Nizami Fakhri Sulemani Hafizi Habibi Faqiri Mehboobi • Peerzada Hazrat Sayed Asif Ali Shah Chishti Nizami Fakhri Sulemani Hafizi Habibi Faqiri Mehboobi

== Published works ==
- Habibul Taliban
- Habib un Nas fi Radd il Khannas
- Diwan e Habib
- Habib ul Awrad
