= Siraj Aurangabadi =

Indian writer

Siraj Uddin Aurangabadi
- Born: Sayyid Sirajuddin; 1715; Aurangabad, Hyderabad Deccan
- Died: 1763 (aged 47–48); Aurangabad, Hyderabad Deccan
- Occupation: Poet
- Writing career
- Language: Urdu Persian
- Genres: Ghazal, Nazm
- Subjects: Mysticism, Sufism
- Notable works: Kulliyat-e-Siraj, Bostan-e-Khayal

Sayyid Sirajuddin, commonly known as Siraj Aurangabadi (1715–1763), was a Sufi mystic poet who initially wrote in Persian and later started writing in Urdu.

== Work and Life ==
The anthology of his poems, Kulliyat-e-Siraj, contains his ghazals along with his masnavi Nazm-i-Siraj. He was influenced by Persian poet Hafiz.

He had also compiled and edited a selection of works of Persian poets under the title "Muntakhib Diwan". The anthology of his poems, entitled Siraj-e-Sukhan, was included in Kulliyat-e-Siraj.

He stopped writing poetry at the age of 24.

In his later life, Aurangabadi renounced the world and became a Sufi ascetic. He lived a life of isolation, though a number of younger poets and admirers used to gather at his place for poetic instruction and religious edification.

His ghazal Khabar-e-Tahayyur-e-Ishq has been sung by Abida Parveen and Ali Sethi paid a tribute to the singer by singing the same ghazal in 2020.

== See also ==
- Muhammad Quli Qutb Shah
- Wali Dakhni
- Azad Bilgrami
- Sikandar Ali Wajd
- Urdu poetry
- List of Urdu Poets
