= Ganj Rawan Ganj Baksh =

Sufi saint

Coordinates: 19°59′6.04″N 75°11′8.03″E

Ganj Rawan Ganj Baksh belonged to the Suhrawardiyya order of Sufi saints, which was founded by Shahab ud din at Baghdad in Hijri 602. He was the earliest of Sufi saint of the Deccan.

== Ganj Rawan Ganj Baksh ==
Saiad Shah Jalalu-d din or Ganj Rawan Ganj Baksh (which means "moving treasure"), was born at Khirkan near Bukhara, and established the earliest Islamic mission in the Dakhan about Hijri 700, (1300 C.E approx) or a little before the invasion of Alaud din Khalji. He settled down at Unasnagar, between Daulatabad and Roza. Ganj Rawan's tomb at Roza has two trees growing near it, one of which is reputed to have grown from a staff given him by his preceptor, and the other from a branch of the first. Both are said to possess miraculous properties.

The mausoleum is to the west of the town. Ganj Rawan Ganj Baksh is believed to be the earliest Mohammedan saint of the district. His dargah has the horse-shoe shaped dome of the Pathans, with piers on the faces supporting pointed arches. It stands on the band of Pari-ka-talav, also known as Ganj Ravan Talav (lake).

== See also ==
- Khuldabad
- Khwaja Zainuddin Shirazi
- Sayyid Burhan-ud-din
- Ashraf Jahangir Semnani
