= Ma'asir al-umara =

Persian-language biography of notables in the Mughal Empire

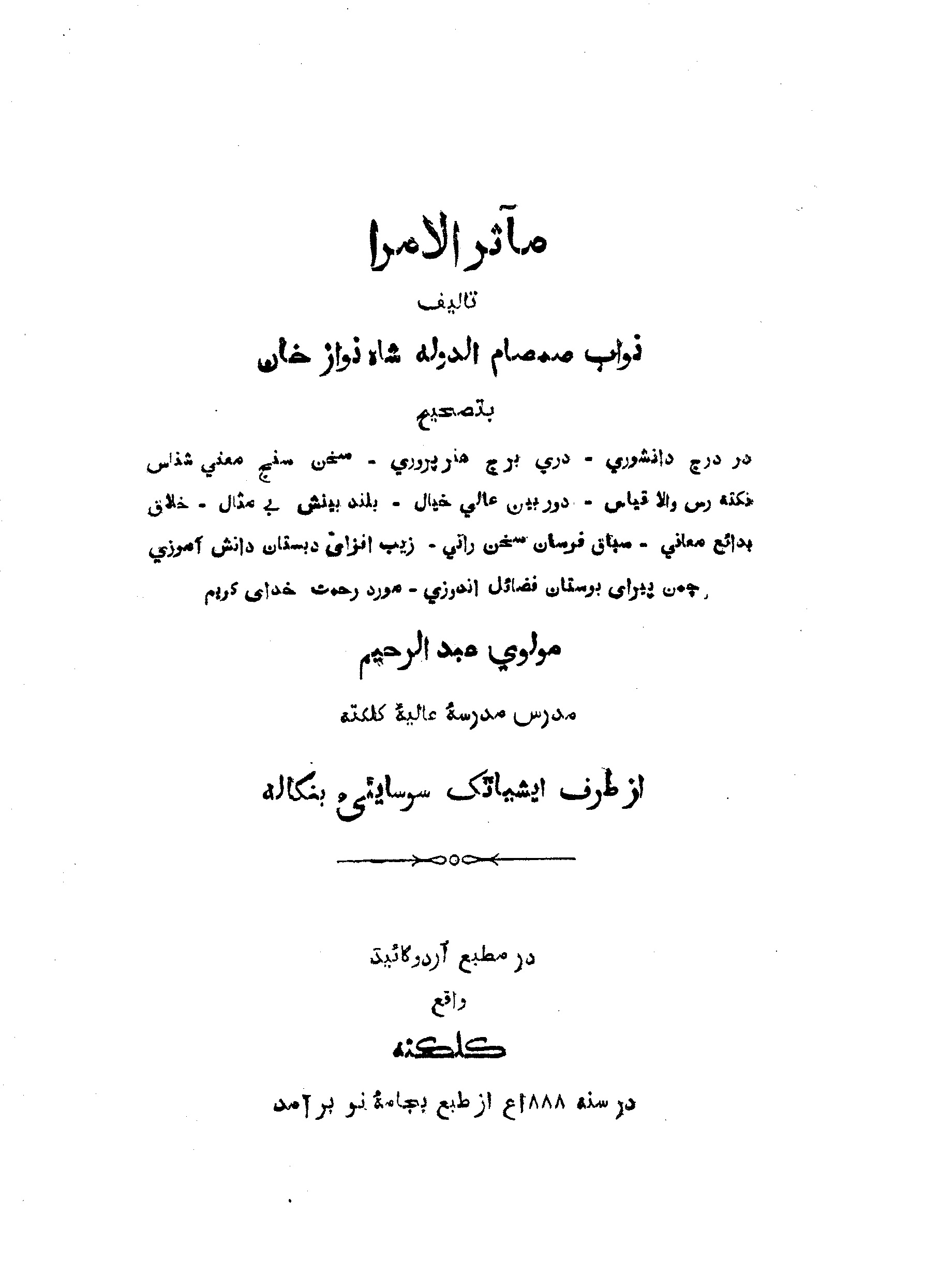
Persian text of Ma'asir al-Umara, published in Calcutta, 1888

Ma'asir al-Umara, written by Samsam ud Daula Shah Nawaz Khan and his son Abdul Hai Khan, at Aurangabad, is a Persian-language biography of notables in the Mughal Empire during the time period approximately 1556–1780. Variants of the title include Ma'athir al-Umara, Maasir al-Umara, and Maathir ul-Umara. Shah Nawaz Khan relies upon a variety of Persian histories for his information, which he lists in his introduction.

An English translation by Beni Prasad and H. Beveridge is available.
