= Hasan Sijzi =

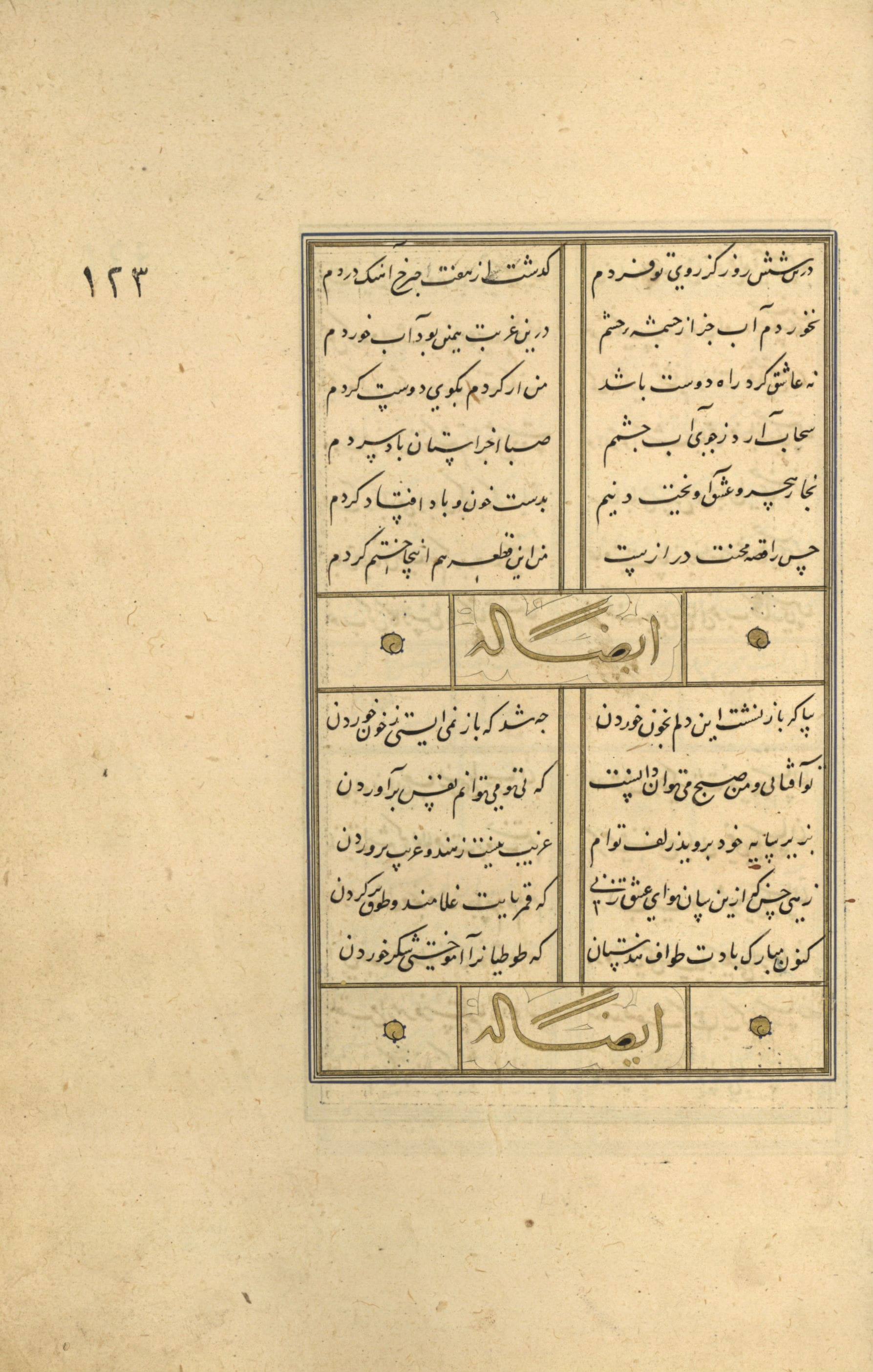
Page from a diwan of Hasan Sijzi copied by Jafar Tabrizi. Herat, 1421–1422. Library of the Islamic Consultative Assembly

Amir Hasan Ala Sijzi Dehlavi (Urdu: امیر حسن علا سجزی دہلوی; 1254 – 1337) was an Indian Muslim poet, scholar and Sufi living in the Delhi Sultanate. He was a disciple of the Chishti master Nizamuddin Auliya, and the compiler of the Persian Sufi manual Fawa'id al Fu'ad (Morals for the Heart) in which the discourses of Nizamuddin have been recorded.

He was a contemporary of the Sufi poet Amir Khusrau and is regarded as the originator of the Indo-Persian ghazal. He is buried in the Khuldabad near Aurangabad, Maharashtra. In the Indian subcontinent, that person was the poet Amir Hasan Sijzi Dehlavi (ca. 1254 – 1337), credited as the originator of the Indo-Persian ghazal. Sadly, Hasan's name has been forgotten by all but the connoisseurs.
