= Nasir Jung =

Nizam of Hyderabad from 1748 to 1750

- Nizam-ul-Mulk; Nasir-ud-Daulah
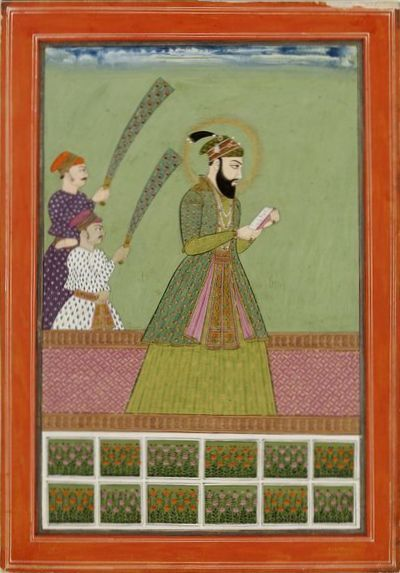
- Portrait of Nasir Jung

2nd Nizam of Hyderabad
- Reign: 1 June 1748 – 16 December 1750
- Predecessor: Asaf Jah I
- Successor: Muzaffar Jung
- Born: 26 February 1712
- Died: 16 December 1750 (aged 38)
- Burial: Khuldabad, Hyderabad State (present day Maharashtra, India)
- House: Asaf Jahi dynasty
- Father: Asaf Jah I
- Religion: Islam

Mir Ahmad Ali Khan Siddiqi Bayafandi, Nasir Jung (26 February 1712 – 16 December 1750), was the second Nizam of Hyderabad State. He was the son of Asaf Jah I and his wife Saeed-un-nisa Begum. He was born 26 February 1712. He had taken up a title of Humayun Jah, Nizam ud-Daula, Nawab Mir Ahmad Ali Khan Siddiqi Bahadur, Nasir Jung, Nawab Subadar of the Deccan. However, he is most famously known as Nasir Jung.

The Mughal Emperor Muhammad Shah bestowed him with the title Nasir Jung and later the next Mughal Emperor Ahmad Shah Bahadur appointed him as the Subedar of the Deccan and bestowed him with the title Nasir-ud-Daula.

== Rise to power ==
Nasir Jung ruled the Hyderabad State from 1 June 1748 to 1750. He was appointed Deputy during his father's absence in Delhi from 1737 to 1741. That same year, Nasir Jung attempted to seize power but was defeated by his father at the Eid Gah Maidan in Aurangabad, on 23 July 1741. After his father's death, he ascended the throne on 2 June 1748 at Burhanpur.

== Second Carnatic War ==
After the death of the Nizam-ul-Mulk, the Nizam of Hyderabad, a war for succession broke out in the south between Nasir Jung (son of the Nizam ) and his nephew Muzaffar Jung (grandson of the Nizam through his daughter). This opened a window of opportunity for Hussain Dost Khan, better known as Chanda Sahib. Chanda Sahib wanted to become Nawab of Carnatic and joined the cause of Muzaffar Jung, conspiring against Nawab Anwar-ud-din Muhammad Khan in Arcot.

At the same time, the governor-general of French India, Joseph François Dupleix, was attempting to use the political confusion to increase French influence in the region as part of a power struggle between British East India Company and the French Compagnie de Indes. Due to the peace between the two nations in Europe, outright hostility was impossible, diplomatic avenues such as alliances and local skirmishes were the best method to achieve this without spurring further international conflict. This led to the Second Carnatic War.

The French sided with Chanda Sahib and Muzaffar Jung to bring them into power in their respective states. But soon the British intervened. To offset the French influence, they began supporting Nasir Jung and Muhammad Ali Khan Walajah the son of late Nawab Anwar-ud-din Muhammad Khan who had recently been killed by the French in Battle of Ambur in 1749.

There were initial successes for the French in both Deccan and Carnatic in defeating and murdering their opponents and placing their supporters on thrones by 1750. It was during one such success that Nasir Jung was killed at Dupleix-Fathabad (Sarasangupettai), near Gingee, by the Pathan Himmat Khan who was Nawab of Kadapa, on 16 December 1750. He was buried at the mausoleum of Burhan ud-Din Gharib, Khuldabad. As a result, Muzaffar Jung acceded to the throne of Hyderabad.

Later, the famous capture of Arcot by the English under Robert Clive in 1751 led to successive British victories and of their South Indian Allies. The war ended with the Treaty of Pondicherry, signed in 1754–55. Muhammad Ali Khan Walajah was recognized as the Nawab of Carnatic. Joseph François Dupleix, the French governor-general, was asked to return to France. The directors of the French Compagnie de Indes were dissatisfied with the political ambitions of Dupleix, which had led to immense financial loss. In 1754, Godeheu replaced Dupleix.

== Death ==
He was killed at Sarasangupettai, near Gingee, by Himmat Khan, the Nawab of Kurnool, on 16 December 1750. He is buried next to his father at Khuldabad, within the shrine of Burhan ud-Din Gharib.

== Positions held ==
- Subedar of Aurangabad 1745–1746.
- Nizam

== Popular culture ==
=== Films and television ===
- In the 2015 Indian historical film Bajirao Mastani, he is portrayed by Kaartik Ahuja.
- In the 2017 Indian historical Peshwa Bajirao (TV series), he is portrayed by Vishal Jethwa .

Nasir Jung Asaf Jahi dynasty
Preceded by Nizam-ul-Mulk	Nizam of Hyderabad; 1 June 1748 – 16 December 1750	Succeeded by Muzaffar Jung
