= List of churches in Puducherry =

Puducherry, formerly known as Pondicherry, is a union territory of India formed out of four exclaves of former French India (being its capital, hence also known informally as Pondichéry) and named after the largest Puducherry district.

== Open places of worship ==
Name	Image	Year built	Location	Denomination/ Affiliation	Notes
Hallelujah Assembly of God Church	Hallelujah AG Church	1979	Thennanjalai Road, Pondicherry - 13 11.9335092°N 79.81827420000002°E	Pentecostal Church	Hallelujah Assembly of God Church is located at the heart of the Union Territory of Pondicherry, India.
Basilica of the Sacred Heart of Jesus		1907	Cardinal De Beausset Street; 11.92626°N 79.82704°E	Roman Catholic	It contains rare stained glass panels depicting events from the life of Christ and saints of the Catholic Church. In recent years it has become one of the famous pilgrimage spots for Christians.
Zion Methodist Church		1991	No.26, Kuber Street, Pakkamudianpet, ECR Road, Puducherry, India; 11.5649°N 79.4838°E	Methodist	The Zion Methodist Church, Pondicherry comes under the Chennai Regional Conference of the Methodist Church in India.
Immaculate Conception Cathedral		1791	Mission Street11.93299°N 79.83055°E	Roman Catholic	The Jesuit Fathers came to Puducherry as missionaries in 1689. They bought a very large garden to the west of the French Fort. In the 1692 they, with the financial help of King Louis XIV, erected a church which was demolished by the Dutch in the following year. A second Church was quickly built in 1699 but could not last long. From 1728 to 1736 a large church was built on the site of the present Cathedral. This third church was razed to the ground by the British in 1761 during the Seven Years' War.
Our Lady of Angels Church		1887	Dumon Street11.93009°N 79.834582°E	Roman Catholic	is the fourth oldest church in Puducherry, a Union territory in South India. The original structure was built in Greco Roman architecture by Napoleon III in 1855, with the architect being Louis Guerre. It is the only church that offers mass in three languages namely French, Tamil and English.
Our Lady of Lourdes Shrine, Villianur		1866	Villianur11.911262°N 79.760664°E	Roman Catholic	In 1867, the MEP missionaries in Puducherry wanted to build a Chapel at Villianur which is 13 kilometers from Pondicherry, on the road to Villupuram. Hence they bought a piece of land at Villianur and Rev.Fr.Gou, then procurator of the Puducherry mission after a long negotiation with the Hindu temple authorities of Thirukameswarer Gogilambigai Temple started to build a Chapel at Kanuvapet on the outskirts of Villianur. It is said that the building of the church was sponsored by the thanksgiving offering of Dr.Lephine's family for the miraculous cure of his daughter.
St. Andrew's Church		1745	Reddiarpalayam 11.931667°N 79.794444°E	Roman Catholic	It is one of the oldest churches in Reddiarpalayam area of Puducherry, a Union territory in South India. The original structure was built in Gothic architecture in 1745 by Kanakaraya Mudali, the longest serving dubash of the French East India Company. During the opening of the Church, Mudali hosted a feast that included all castes and religions, the first of its kind that is recorded in the history of South India. It is believed that the Church was destroyed by the British in 1761 and was later rebuilt in 1830. It is the first Church in South India to have an inscriptions made in Tamil during the times.
