= Kanakaraya Mudali =

French Indian broker

Pedro Kanagaraya Mudaliar
- பெத்ரோ கனகராய முதலியார்
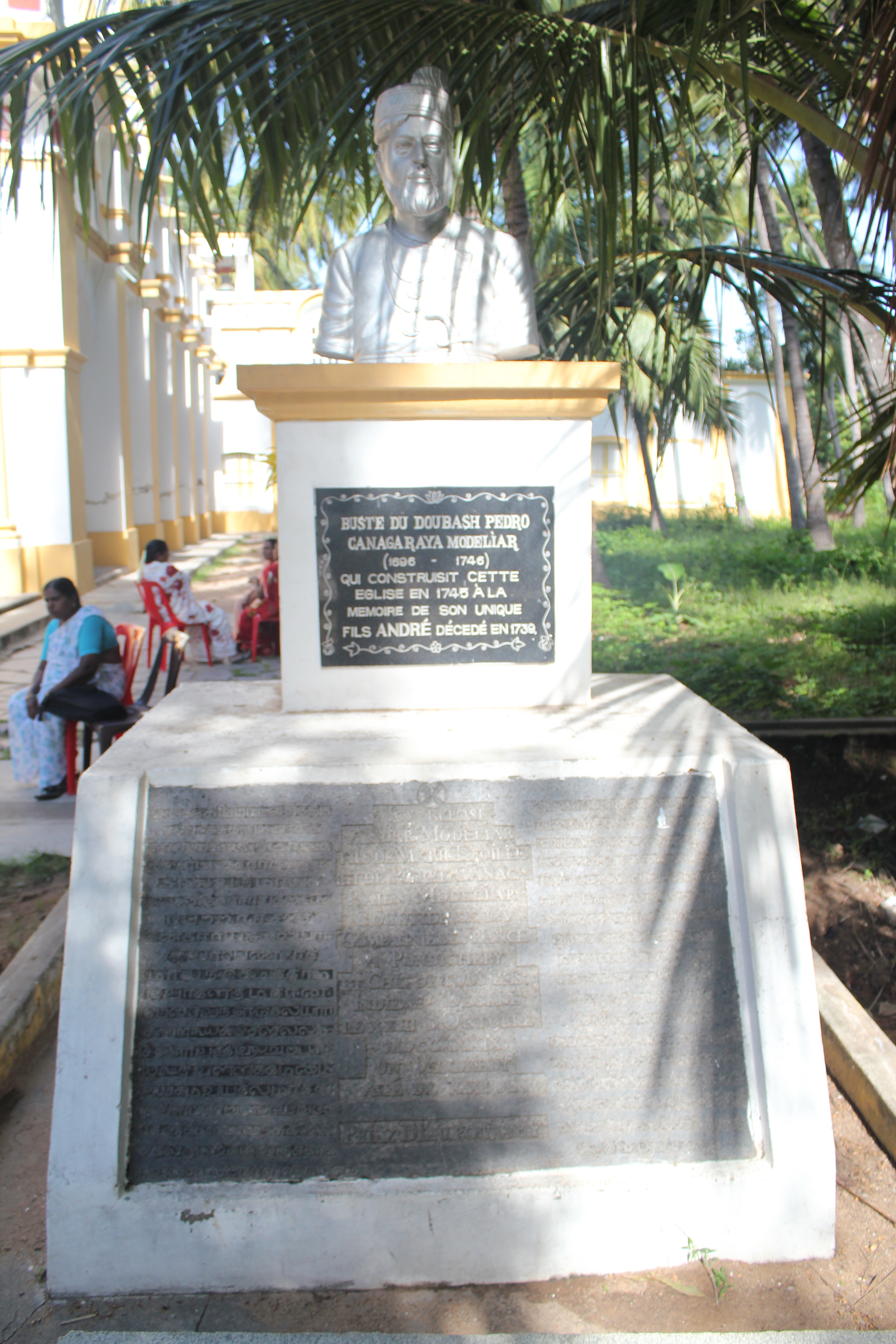
- Kanagaraya Mudaliar's Bust at St. Andrew's Church, Puducherry
- Born: 1696; Pondicherry
- Died: 12 February 1746 (aged 49–50); Pondicherry
- Other name: Kanagaraya Mudali
- Occupations: Chief Dubash and Broker
- Years active: 1722–1746
- Employer: French East India Company
- Known for: Building St. Andrews Church, Reddiarpalayam, Pondicherry
- Title: Chief Dubash of Pondicherry
- Predecessor: Guruva Pillai
- Successor: Ananda Ranga Pillai
- Spouse: Natchathiram
- Children: 1

Pedro Kanakaraya Mudaliar was the chief dubash and a broker for the French East India Company. He remained in service for the longest period of 24 years between 1722 and 1746, especially during the early period of Joseph François Dupleix. He was succeeded by Ananda Ranga Pillai. Everything known about his life comes from the private diary of Ananda Ranga Pillai and the inscriptions found on the walls of St. Andrews Church, which he built in the memory of his dead son. In the diary, he is portrayed as being jealous and the chief rival of Ranga Pillai. Thus, the accuracy of the description is questionable.

As a broker, his roles were to act as an intermediary, supervising the manufacture of clothes, warehousing, and export of merchandise. Although the role of the broker was not to supply the French company with manufactured goods, he did so. He was a great merchant.

== Early life ==
Nothing is known about the early life of Pedro Kanagaraya Mudaliar. All converted Christians were poor except the family of Kanagaraya Mudaliar and his brothers. It was only of late years that a few had been able to keep themselves in comfort as Europeans' dubashes or in other employment.

His grandfather Thanappa Mudaliar was the first chief dubash of the French East India Company. Thanappa played an important role in creating and instituting the French colony in Pondicherry.

Thanappa Mudaliar, who belonged to the thondaimanadala Vellalar community, embraced Christianity with his son on 20 March 1671 and took the name Lazaro de Mota. He did business in rice with French starting from 1672. The French kept him as their consultant in trade and commerce. It was by his suggestion that the French officials reached Pondicherry by sea on 15 January 1674 with 150 migrants. Thanappa Mudaliar was appointed as the chief agent of the East India Company in 1674. He was appointed as the head of the Tamil merchants in 1686. He was thus given the full control over the entire business of the company with the native merchants. He was the one to fix the prices of all commodities made available to the French in Pondicherry.

Thanappa Mudaliar invited weavers from neighboring places and made them settle down in areas with a view to procuring sufficient volumes of textiles for export. He got constructed storehouses for the commodities so textiles, saltpeter, camphor, ivory, precious stones, and spices from other regions were brought to Pondicherry for export to France.

His son Andre Muthappa Mudaliar discharged the duties of the courtier from 1699 on ward. On his demise Nainiappa was asked to take charge in 1708. He held an important position in French Pondicherry.

== As a Dubash ==
Nainiappa Pillai had to face allegations of corruption and was imprisoned on 19 February 1716. Kanakaraya Mudaliar the grandson of Thanappa Mudaliar entered the service of the French Company as courier between 1716 and 1743. It seems that he got the position because the Chief Ecclesiastes of the Colony strongly desired that the holders of the office needed to be a Christian. Kanakaraya was removed from the post of dubash from 1618 to 1624. (Note: During this time, the post was held by Guruvappa Pillai) The reason for the removal was a misunderstanding between the Governor and Kanakaraya. The lack of knowledge of Tamil and their unfamiliarity with the well-established customs and process of the natives, prompted the French officials to reappoint Kanakarayar to that post.

He supplied commodities to the French. He used to get the Indian merchants contracts for the supply of commodities. In 1739 when the French were in financial difficulties, he advanced money to them even without interest thus gaining their trust. He engaged himself in the supply of cloth to the French for export in 1743.

== Selling his ship ==
It is recorded by Ananda Ranga Pillai that Kanakaraya Mudaliar sold his ship. The sale of the ship was documented in the presence of the notary. Kanakaraya Mudaliar seems to be the first Tamil, who owned a ship during the French rule in India. A certificate of sale of The Soucourarna was issued in June 1730. The sale was made for the value of 2800 pagodas. Dupleix remitted the amount to him in the form of cargo of gold of the voyage to Bengal and Surat.

== Honoured by the French Government ==
The Kanakaraya Mudaliar administration and the trustworthy made the French officials honour him with a gold medal. This was arranged on 17 October 1738 to present a medal bearing the king's image on one side and the company's arms on the other. He was honoured in the open council, and that was witnessed by his successor Anandaranga Pillai. Eleven guns were fired on the occasion. A gift of a palanquin inlaid with ivory was also made to him.

== Death of his son ==
On 22 October 1739, his only son Velavendra Mudali (birth: 12 September 1718) died aged 21. Even though the circumstances and the cause of death are not recorded, Ananda Ranga Pillai being a well versed astrologer, suggests in his diary that this is due to a bad turn in Kanagaraya Mudaliyar's astrology. He also records that Velavendra was buried the next day at 3:00 PM with silk attire and pearl earrings and ring to his finger.

Kanagaraya was very much disturbed as his son was very helpful to him in all aspects. When they returned from the cemetery, Ananda Ranga Pillai records that Kanagaraya's wife's sari was set ablaze in an accident and one his Kanagaraya's house was destroyed in fire costing him around 100 varagans. All of this are considered by Ananda Ranga Pillai as astrological misfortunes.

== Feast for building St. Andrews Church ==
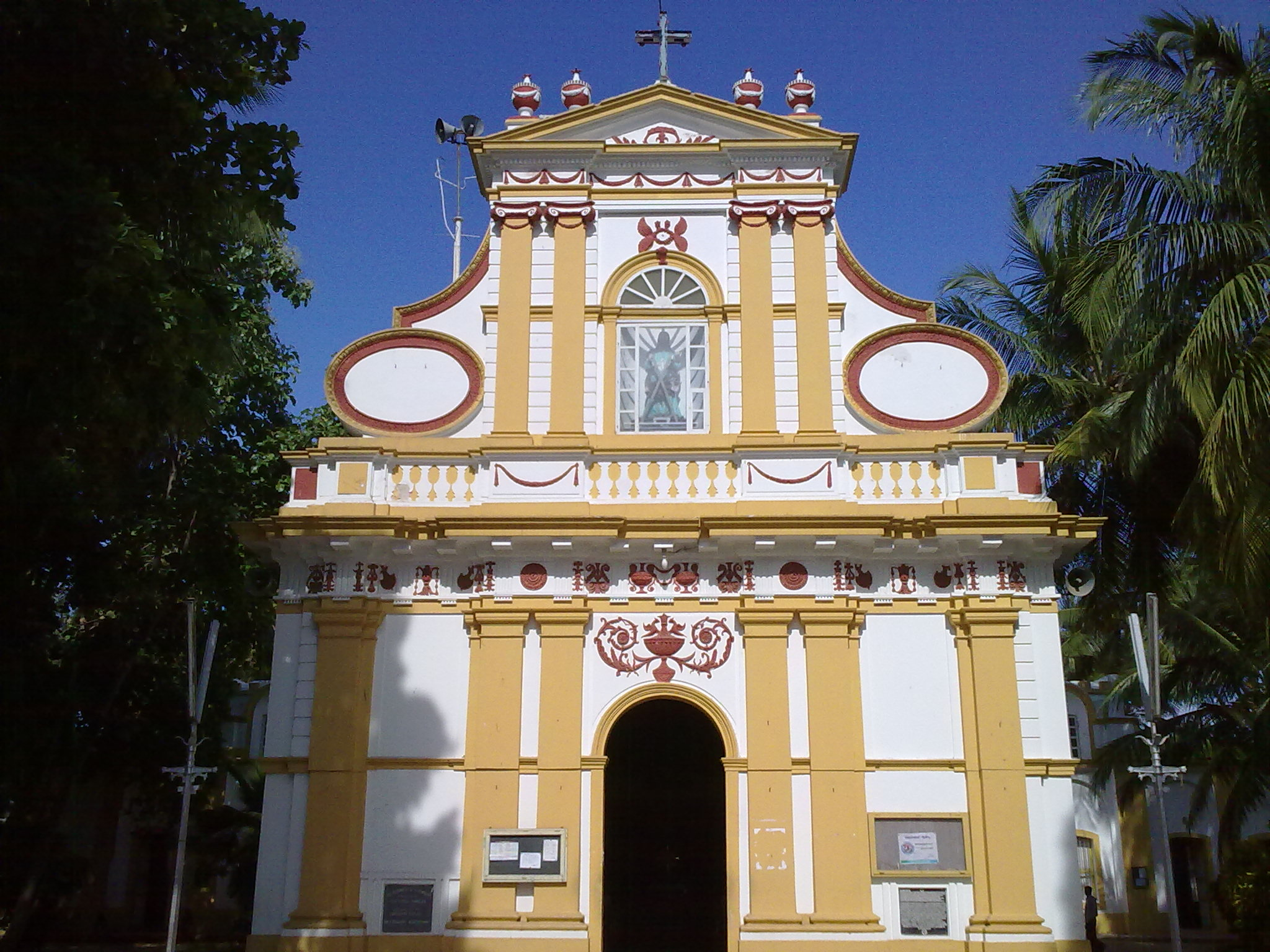
St. Andrews Church, built by Kanagaraya Mudaliar in memory of his son

Ananda Ranga Pillai records in his diary the erection of a new church on 30 November 1745 by Kanagaraya. On this day he has invited he invited everyone without distinction of caste or religion. This is the first recorded equality meal (சம பந்தி விருந்து) in Tamil Nadu. He invited all the Brahmans, Vellazhas, Komuttis, Chettis, goldsmiths, weavers, oil-mongers, and people of other castes along all Europeans and Christians.

Ranga pillai notes that Kanagaraya made elaborate arrangements for preparation of food. Different caste people were prepared food in places of Pondicherry as per their tradition. Ranga Pillai states that the feast started at 1:00 PM. The Governor Dupleix, his consort, in company with all the members of Council partook of the banquet. He remained until 5 in the evening, and then returned to Mortancli Cbavadi. They only problem was that each caste people were forced to partake in the banquet as per his caste traditions alone.

== Death ==
On the afternoon of 11 February 1746, Kanagaraya Mudali fell ill and almost unconscious. His wife Natchathiram sent word to the wife of the governor, Jeanne Dupleix. She came and consoled Kanagaraya Mudaliar. Natchathiram requested Jeanne Dupleix to seal her husband's house, in case of his death, so that his brother wouldn't claim his property.

On 12 February 1746, at 05:00 AM, Kanagaraya Mudaliar died. He left behind his wife and his childless, widowed daughter-in-law. The house was sealed as requested by Natchathiram. A grand state funeral was arranged. It is described by Ananda Ranga Pillai in his diary as follows:

The Mudali's body, handsomely dressed, girt with the laced sash which M. Dumas had sent from Europe, and adorned in many other ways — exactly as a king when coming out of his palace — was then put in a coffin; and the corpse was brought out at 7 in the evening. A stately horse, followed by forty soldiers, bearing arms, was led in front of the procession; the drums beat a funeral march; forty European boys studying in the mission college marched along in two lines, on either side of the cortege; and the priests of the church of the Capuchins and that of St. Paul went along reciting prayers, according to the rites prescribed by their religion. Then the Councillors and the ladies of their families, numbers of the European gentry of both sexes, natives, Muhammadans, and other people, including women, came out to look at the procession. There was no one in the crowd who did not feel sorry for this death.

As the corpse was in this wise being borne along from the house to the burial ground, amidst general mourning, the Governor, his lady, and some of the Councillors, came, and waited near the Kalatti Iswaran temple. When the coffin approached, the Governor and those with him stood up, holding candles in their hands, according to the rites of the Christian religion; and after it had passed them, they gave these away, entered their palanciuins, and went home. When the corpse reached the cemetery, the coffin was lowered into the vault wherein the body of the Mudali's son was buried; the soldiers then discharged eleven guns were fired from the fort. After the deceased had been thus interred, the people departed.

The Mudali entered on his duties on Friday 10 September 1724. He served twenty-one years, five months, and a few days. Scarcely has it been the lot of any one else to live without interruption in the same style, for so long a period.

=== Problem of inheritance ===
When the question of deciding who should inherit Kanakaraya's property came up in 1748, a committee of 20 officials were appointed to arbitrate. Ananda Ranga Pillai led the committee. The committee decided that Chinna Mudali, the brother of the deceased Kanakaraya Mudali was the rightful heir to his estate. However, Chinna Mudali was not satisfied and the matter dragged on till April 1746, when Dupleix decided the case combining Mitakshara law and the concept of legitim from French jurisprudence. Balancing the interests of the two women was what Dupleix had to achieve. The women were given life interest in the property and, after their lifetime, the properties were to go to Kanakaraya's brother Tanappa Mudaliar.

== Notes ==
Preceded by Thanappa Mudali	Chief dubash of French India; 1722–1746	Succeeded by Ananda Ranga Pillai
