= Siege of Trichinopoly (1751–1752) =

1751-52 siege of Trichinopoly during the Second Carnatic War

- Part of the Second Carnatic War
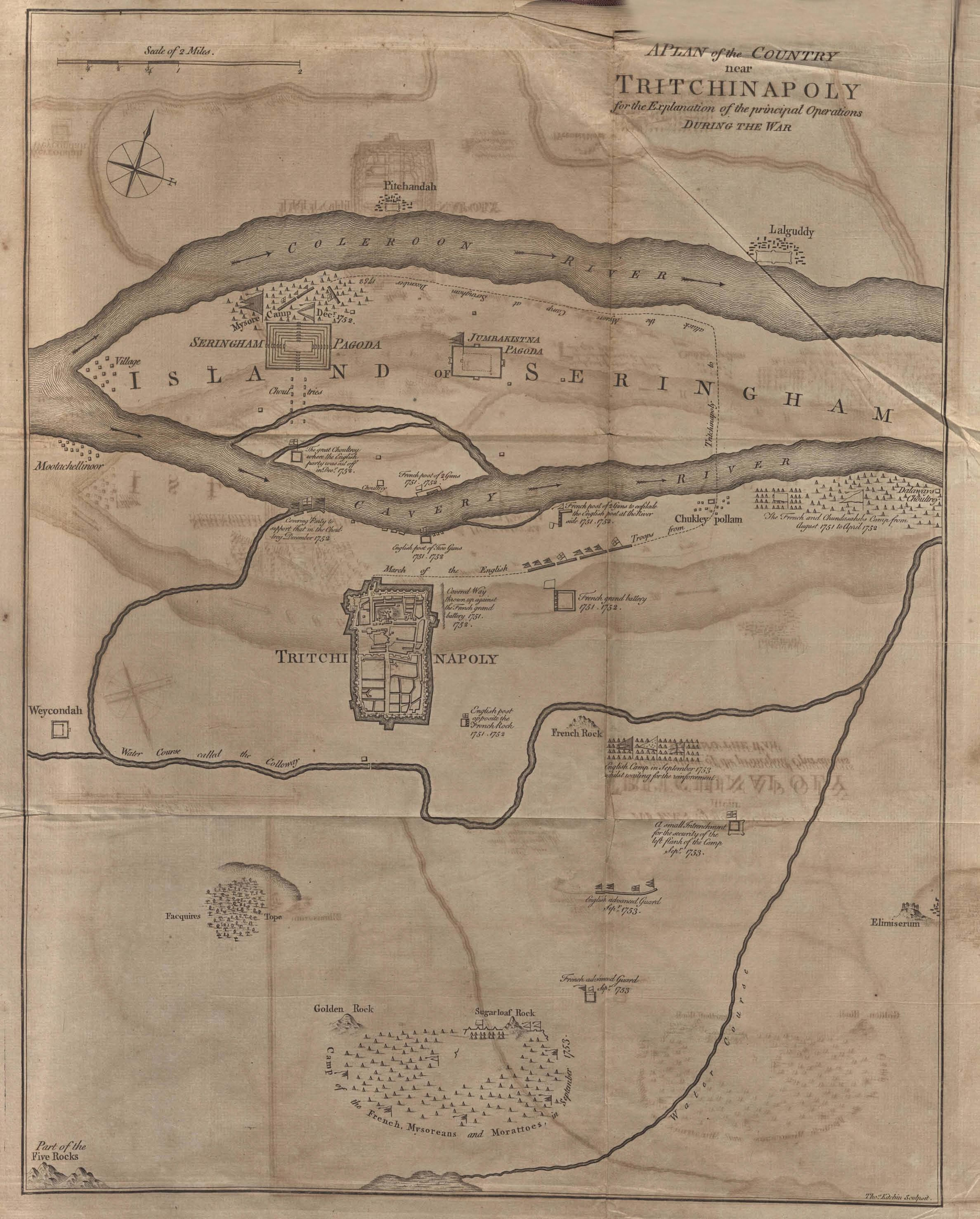
- Map of Trichinopoly During Second Carnatic War
Date	July 1751 – 10 April 1752
Location	Tiruchirappalli, modern-day Tamil Nadu
Result	British-Maratha Allied Victory

Belligerents
France: French East India Company; Nawab of Arcot	Great Britain: East India Company; Maratha Empire: Thanjavur Marathas; Kingdom of Mysore; Rival claimants: Muhammad Ali Khan Wallajah

Commanders and leaders
Chanda Sahib; Raza Sahib; Joseph François Dupleix	Stringer Lawrence; Robert Clive; Muhammad Ali Khan Wallajah; Murari Rao; Manoji; Nanja Raja

The siege of Trichinopoly (1751–1752) was conducted by Chanda Sahib, who had been recognized as the Nawab of the Carnatic by representatives of the French East India Company, against the fortress town of Tiruchirappalli, held by Muhammed Ali Khan Wallajah.

== Background ==
Following the Battle of Ambur in 1749, in which Muhammed's father Anwaruddin Muhammed Khan was slain, Muhammed fled to Trichinopoly. Chanda, assisted by Joseph François Dupleix, had planned to besiege Muhammed there in 1749, but the need for funding and provisions led him to instead besiege Tanjore first, and movements of Chanda's Maratha enemies prompted him to lift that siege and move north to face the new threat. Muhammed had in the meantime opened separate negotiations with both the French and British for support. In response to these, the British sent several hundred Europeans to Trichinopoly.

== Siege ==
In March 1751, Chanda again began moving south from the Carnatic capital of Arcot, again with French support. The size of his force prompted the British at Madras to send additional troops toward Trichinopoly to intercept Chanda. After a brief encounter near Valikondapuram in July, the outnumbered British retreated to Trichinopoly. Chanda followed with his main army, and began besieging the fortress town. Siege operations were principally conducted by the French contingent, first under D'Auteuil, and the later under Law.

In an attempt to relieve the siege, the British in Madras sent Captain Robert Clive with a small force to occupy Arcot, which Chanda had left inadequately defended. Chanda detached 4,000 of his siege force in an attempt to recover Arcot; this attempt failed, propelling Clive into a more prominent role in India.

=== Arrival of Mysore and Maratha Troops ===
Muhammad Ali Khan Wallajah obtained help from Mysorean general Naneraja, Murari Rao of Gooty and Maratha ruler Pratap Singh of Thanjavur. The siege was eventually lifted, and the tables turned in April 1752 with the arrival of British reinforcements led by Stringer Lawrence and including Clive. On 9 April Lawrence made a junction with troops sent out of Trichinopoly and made it inside the lines. Two days later he led a sortie against the besiegers, prompting Law to lift the siege and retreat to the isle of Srirangam.

== Aftermath ==
The British then seized the opportunity to act against an indecisive opponent, and besieged the French on the island. Chanda eventually negotiated a surrender to Tanjorean forces that had arrived to assist the British, believing this to be preferable to surrendering to the British. The Tanjoreans violated their promises to assist in his escape and beheaded him on 14 June. Law surrendered the French troops on the same day.

== See also ==
- Fort St George
- Fort St David
- Tiruchirappalli Fort
