= Kabbaldurga =

Ruined fort in India

Kabbaldurga is a ruined fort located in Bengaluru South district, Karnataka. It is at a distance of 75 km from Bangalore. Murari Rao Ghorpade, 18th century Maratha chieftain who controlled Gooty was defeated by Hyder Ali in 1776 AD and kept in Kabbaldurga fort till death. Murari Rao surrendered and sent to this fort along with his family members. During British Raj, convicts were thrown off the cliff of this port, as a punishment. As it is near Bangalore, it is a favourite trekking destination, which is a relatively easy trekking and night trekking is also undertaken by private groups. Old and crumbling buildings on top of the fort represent a prison, garrison, ammunition storage godown and there are small temples of Bheemalilngeshwara and Kabbalamma temple.
