= Maha Raja Rajya Shri =

The honorific prefix Maha Raja Rajya Shri (abbreviated to M. R. Ry or formerly M. R. Ry.) is a style that is used before the names of certain classes of south Indian nobility.

== Usage ==
The abbreviation of the title is said to be derived from Sanskrit lexicons, the title "Raja-sry" being a dyotaka (signifier) for the Kshatriya nobility and Dravidian aristocracy of south India.

When M. R. Ry. is used before a name, it is usually preceded by the title of His Highness and usually always follows with the suffix Avl.

It appears to be used before the names of all chiefs in the southern Indian princely order. For example, cases involving south Indian princes and chiefs in the Judicial Committee of the Privy Council of the United Kingdom include this honorific before personal names and preceding their full title: The Zamorin of Calicut is styled as "M. R. Ry. Manavikrama, Zamorin Raja Avl of Calicut" in a Judicial Committee of the Privy Council decision (Laws (PVC)-1925-4-92) and other court cases.

It is considered similar to the title "The Most Noble" or "The Most Honourable" used in the United Kingdom for certain higher classes of the peerage. It is by courtesy used for all higher-ranking officials of the state and sthanom holders (ruling chiefs). The title is reserved for men; the spouse or consort receives no additional style.

== Usage examples ==
Younger members of the ruling families in Travancore, Cochin, and Pudukottai use the title.

The Judicial Committee of the Privy Council of the United Kingdom used the abbreviated version of the title while addressing ruling chiefs of India instead of the courtesy title His Highness. and other court cases.

The diarist Ananda Ranga Pillai, also known as the "Pepys of India", was styled "M. R. Ry. Ananda Ranga Pillai Avergal" in early French documents.

Many instances can be found in the London Gazette.

== See also ==
- Maharaja
- Raja
- The Most Noble
- The Right Honourable
- The Much Honoured
- Sri
