= Ananda Ranga Pillai =

Indian diarist (1709–1761)

M. R. Ry. Ananda Ranga Pillai
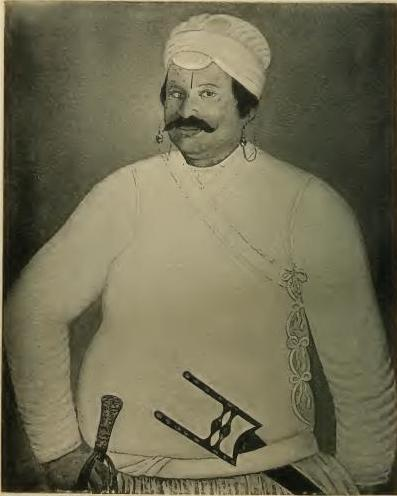
- A portrait of Ananda Ranga Pillai
- Born: 30 March 1709; Madras, Madras Presidency (now Chennai, Tamil Nadu, India)
- Died: 16 January 1761 (aged 51); Pondicherry, French India
- Occupations: merchant, dubash
- Employer: French East India Company
- Known for: His private diaries which narrate the day-to-day functioning of the French East India Company in Pondicherry
- Title: Chief Dubash of Pondicherry
- Term: 1709–61
- Predecessor: Kanakaraya Mudali
- Spouse: Mangathayi Ammal
- Children: Pappal, Ponnachi, Nannachi Annasamy, Ayyasamy

M. R. Ry. Ananda Ranga Pillai (Tamil: ஆனந்தரங்கம் பிள்ளை; 30 March 1709 – 16 January 1761) (often pronounced as Ānañtarañkam Pillai) was a dubash in the service of the French East India Company.

He is mainly famous for his set of private diaries from the years 1736 to 1761 which portray life in 18th century India. He is also remembered for developing the Tiruvengadam courtage strategy, a new method of courtage in India that is popularly described in several Indian economic books. As described in his journals, it consists in developing a strategy of making new fraud coins in a parallel economy.

Ananda Ranga Pillai was born in Madras in a well-to-do family. At a very early age, Ananda Ranga Pillai emigrated with his father to Pondicherry where the family pursued their business interests. On his father's death in 1726, Ananda Ranga was made dubash and served in his capacity until his removal on grounds of ill-health and deteriorating performance. Ananda Ranga died in 1761 at the age of 51. Ananda Ranga was especially known for his proximity to the French Governor Joseph François Dupleix, who favored him in various appointments.

Ananda Ranga Pillai's diaries were translated in the early 20th century and bring to light life in the mid-18th century and the Anglo-French Carnatic wars. His mansion in Pondicherry has been recognized as a heritage monument. C. S. Srinivasachari, a prominent Indian historian, described Ananda Ranga Pillai as the "Samuel Pepys of French India".

== Early life ==
Ananda Ranga Pillai was born to a famous Yadava Merchant Tiruvengada Pillai on 30 March 1709 in the village of Perambur on the outskirts of Madras, then, the center of Tiruvengada Pillai's business activities. In 1716, at the behest of Nainiya Pillai, brother-in-law of Tiruvengada Pillai, who then functioned as the chief Indian agent of French Pondicherry, Guillaume André d'Hébert, the territory's French Governor invited Tiruvengada Pillai and other important Indian merchants of Madras, to his city. Relying on Nainiya Pillai's advice, Tiruvengada moved with his family and businesses to Pondicherry and settled there. Soon afterwards, Nainiya Pillai fell out of favor with the Governor and was imprisoned and later died. In contrast, Tiruvengada rapidly rose in favor with the French rulers and attained a respectable position in the city.

On the arrest of Nainiya Pillai, Tiruvengada Pillai had fled to Madras fearing arrest and ill-treatment. However, La Prévostière who succeeded d’Hébert induced Tiruvengada to return. Meanwhile, Nainiya Pillai's son Guruva Pillai escaped to France via Madras. His charges against d’Hébert before the Duke of Orléans were responsible for the removal and replacement of Governor d’Hébert. Guruva Pillai later adopted Christianity and settled down in France, where he was admitted to the Order of Saint Michael as a chevalier. Guruva Pillai died in 1724 followed by Tiruvengada Pillai in June 1726. His name is mentioned in the history of 8th class.

== Early career ==
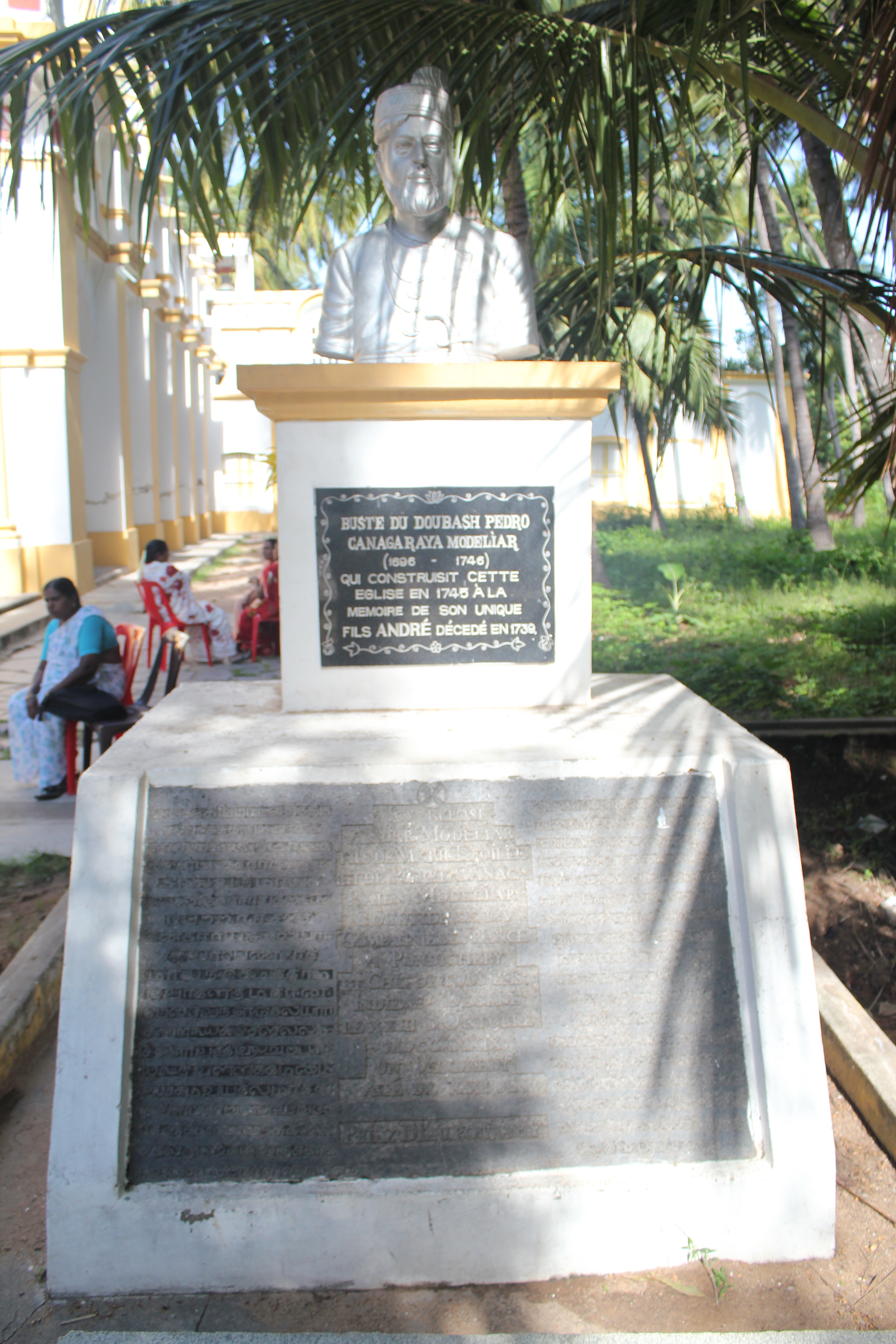
Bust of Kanakaraya Mudali at the church he built

Pierre Christophe Le Noir who succeeded La Prévostière had great regard for Tiruvengada Pillai and his family. Hence on Tiruvengada Pillai's death in 1726, he gave employment to his son Ananda Ranga Pillai in the French East India Company and made him the chief of the Indian employees at the company's factory at Porto Novo. Soon, Ananda Ranga proved his worth. Large quantities of blue cloth were manufactured at Porto Novo. This was made possible mainly due to the efforts of Ananda Ranga Pillai who also established trading posts at Lalapettai and Arcot for trading Indian merchandise for European manufactures. Ananda's fortune reached greater heights during the tenure of Le Noir's successor Pierre Benoît Dumas who, too, seemed to have had a favorable opinion of him.

Until his death, Guruva Pillai had functioned as the chief dubash of Pondicherry. A dubash was a merchant in service of the company who roughly performed the task of a translator and intermediary between Indian and European merchants. On Guruva's death, the chief dubash position passed into the hands of another family as Guruva Pillai's children had been raised as Hindus and the Chief Ecclesiastes of the Colony strongly desired that the holders of the particular office needed to be a Christian. When Dupleix became the Governor, the chief dubash was one Kanakaraya Mudali with whom Ananda Ranga Pillai had a bitter rivalry. However, Kanakaraya Mudali died in the year 1746 and in 1747, after many consultations and decision-making, Ananda Ranga Pillai was made chief dubash.

== Rise to power ==
"On considering this transaction, it appears to me that our lordly Governor was bereft of sense; and it was in this wise".
– Ananda Ranga Pillai on Governor Dupleix, regarding Dupleix's decision over a minor local dispute.|

In November 1738, the bitter rivalry that had existed between Ananda Ranga Pillai and the chief dubash Kanakaraya Mudali flared up into a conflagration. Observing that Ananda Ranga Pillai had not remitted the interest for the loan he had borrowed to pay coral merchants, Kanakaraya Mudali reported the same to the Governor. Initially, the Governor Dumas insisted upon the dubash paying the interest but later, on learning of the heavy losses that had befallen the dubash that year, he conceded and even offered to pay off Ananda Ranga Pillai's debts. But Ananda Ranga Pillai refused. The matter was raised before the Council where Ananda Ranga had to answer for the charges brought out against him. Ananda Ranga pleaded with Mr. Golard a member of the Council explaining that he had never paid interest before. At length, the Council decided in favor of Ananda Ranga Pillai and his debt was waived.

On 22 October 1739, Kanakaraya Mudali's son, Velvendra Mudali died at the age of 21. Velvendra's mother committed suicide on hearing the news.

On 19 October 1741, Dumas left Pondicherry leaving charge to the Deputy Governor who ruled Pondicherry until 14 January 1742 when Joseph François Dupleix arrived from Chandannagar. During Dupleix's tenure, Ananda Ranga rose to the zenith of power and prominence in French India and exercised firm control over the internal affairs of the territory.

A map of the Carnatic in Ananda Ranga Pillai's time

From 1743 onwards, Ananda Ranga won the confidence of the Governor of Pondicherry and rose up the ranks. when the suburban villages of Pondicherry were leased for five years to Kumara Pillai, Vira Nayakkan, Chandramadi Pillai, and Ella Pillai, Ananda Ranga Pillai was able to offer surety for the renters for a period of five years. Nevertheless, when Kesava Aiyan died, Ananda Ranga was not able to prevent Kanakaraya Mudali from nominating his brother-in-law Gavinivasa Mudali as dubash in Kesava Aiyan's place. Kanakaraya Mudali secured his objective despite the vehement protests of Ananda Ranga Pillai. On 29 June 1744, the marriage of Ananda Ranga Pillai's daughter Papal was conducted in regal splendor. Ananda Ranga further solidified his position by mediating in disputes such as those between Prakasa Mudali and Tiruvengada Pillai, etc. Not to be left behind, on 30 November 1745, Ananda Ranga's great rival Kanakaraya Mudali constructed a church at Ozhukkarai and celebrated its consecration by providing a great feast. Ananda Ranga Pillai, however, reported heavy criticism from guests for inviting people of non-Christian faiths for the feast celebrating the consecration of a church.

On 12 February 1746, Kanakaraya Mudali died and on his death, there was an inheritance dispute between his heirs. A Committee of 20 officials were appointed to arbitrate and Ananda Ranga Pillai led the committee. The Committee decided that Chinna Mudali, the brother of the deceased Kanakaraya Mudali was the rightful heir to his estate. However, Chinna Mudali was not satisfied and the matter dragged on until April 1746, when Ananda Ranga's diplomacy finally sealed the matter.

Apart from pleasing the Governor through his service, Ananda Ranga Pillai also incurred the Governor's wrath on certain occasions. There was at least one occasion during the period when Ananda Ranga was questioned by Dupleix regarding payment of the large sum of money he owed to the company. Ananda Ranga Pillai, however, soon cleared off his debts by paying one Suga Singh the money the Company owed him. However, still, Dupleix demanded 1,000 pagodas that Ananda Ranga Pillai owed the company. It was evident that much more than the service Ananda Ranga Pillai had rendered to the company, it was Ananda Ranga Pillai's position as Dupleix's favorite that had helped him scale the ladder.

Ananda Ranga Pillai was questioned by the Governor regarding the ill-treatment of a prisoner called Mari Chetti. Chinna Mudali was deputed to interrogate two eyewitnesses Tandavarayan and Rangan and they swore that Ananda Ranga's conduct towards Mari Chetty was, in no way, objectionable. Based on this evidence, Ananda Ranga was acquitted.

Throughout Dupleix's tenure, Ananda Ranga Pillai entertained dignitaries as the dubash of Fort St David, Indian merchants, and even Mahé de Labourdonnais. He also supervised the regular payment of revenue. Official communications to the Governor, too, was handled by him. He performed errands for the Governor and adjudicated on criminal cases. In May 1746, he interceded on behalf of one Karaikal Tiruvengadam who had been imprisoned and obtained his release.

Soon after Kanakaraya Mudali's death in February 1746, his younger brother Chinna Mudali started making efforts to obtain the post of Chief Dubash which his brother had previously held. However, the property dispute he had with Kanakaraya Mudali's wife and his own lack of competence and skill soon saw him out of the race. On 12 June 1746, de Bausset, a longtime companion of Ananda Ranga Pillai urged him to campaign for Chief Dubash-ship. However, Ananda Ranga Pillai seems to have been reluctant to accept the post initially when the Governor nominated Ananda Ranga Pillai for the post. However, on the insistence of Mrs. Dupleix he accepted. At that time, he came to know that another aspirant Annapurna Aiyan had bribed the Governor and his wife for the post. However, this attempt failed as Ananda Ranga Pillai was eventually appointed chief dubash. Mrs. Dupleix allegedly demanded exorbitant bribes in order to support his candidature.

== As chief dubash ==
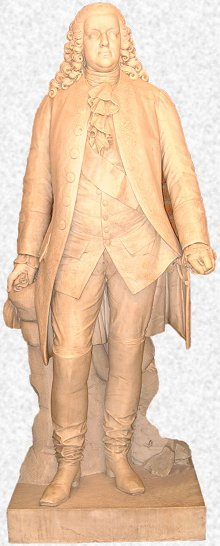
Joseph François Dupleix, who is alleged to have shown an unusual amount of liking and patronization for Ananda Ranga Pillai

The official appointment of Ananda Ranga Pillai was delayed by a couple of years due to the stoppage of trade arising out of the outbreak of hostilities between the French and the British. The British responded to the French occupation of Madras by launching an invasion of Pondicherry in July 1747. This invasion launched by Admiral Boscawen ultimately failed to capture Pondicherry but hostilities soon came to an end by the Treaty of Aix-la-Chappelle.

In 1748, Ananda Ranga Pillai was officially designated chief dubash of French India. Soon afterwards, hostilities with the British broke out once again. The French waged a proxy war on behalf of Chanda Sahib supporting his claim in the war of succession to the throne of Carnatic. The British felt compelled to intervene and support Muhammad Ali in order to check the rise of French influence in the Deccan. In the early stages of the war, the French gained the upper hand and by May 1751, French power in India was at its zenith. However, the arrival of Robert Clive thwarted the French attempts to win the battle for Chanda Sahib and the French eventually lost. During the later stages of the war, Pillai notes, Dupleix's temperament grew highly irritable and officers, including himself, feared to approach him. The lavishly constructed palace at Pondicherry, the Gouvernement was completed during this period.

Pillai also expressed strong disapproval of some of the allegedly corrupt measures of Governor Dupleix's wife Madame Dupleix. The bitterness led to open hostilities between them. Pillai was given the charge of collecting the revenue of a few villages in Karaikal and he performed his duties satisfactorily despite the prevalence of inconsistencies and unreliability of the records kept by his subordinate agents.

Following the unsuccessful bid at territorial expansion, Dupleix's fortunes declined rapidly. He fell out of favour and was replaced as Governor-General with Charles Godeheu in the year 1754. With Dupleix's departure for France, Pillai's influence in the colony began to decline. To make matters worse, he was frequently troubled by poor health. By 1756, his health had deteriorated to such an extent that the Governor-General Georges Duval de Leyrit was obliged to remove him from service.

== Death and legacy ==
Pillai's health worsened with the passage of time. However, he notes in his diary, the corruption and intrigues which allegedly plagued the French colony on Dupleix's departure.

Pillai died on 12 January 1761 at the age of 51, just four days before Pondicherry surrendered to the troops of Colonel Coote. Pillai left behind three daughters. He also had two sons Annasamy and Ayyasamy who predeceased him.

Since the discovery and translation of his diaries during the 19th and early 20th centuries, Ananda Ranga Pillai has accumulated a great deal of posthumous fame and recognition for his depiction of 18th century South India, the intrigues and deals in French Pondicherry and his description of the French conquest of Madras and the Carnatic Wars. His set of diaries have emerged as one of our primary sources of reference on the Carnatic Wars. Ananda Ranga Pillai has been referred to by V. V. S. Aiyar in his journal Balabharati and had attracted the curiosity of Subrahmanya Bharati, Aurobindo Ghosh and Mandyam Srinivasa Iyengar. C. S. Srinivasachari, a prominent Indian historian, described Ananda Ranga Pillai as "the Samuel Pepys of French India". George D. Bearce wrote of Pillai's diaries that "nothing quite like it exists in Indian literature"; although Indian princes like Jai Singh and the Mughal emperors wrote autobiographical works, "they did not transmit the day by day detail and vividness of Ananda Ranga Pillai's diary." Among the topics he covers in his diaries are the daily operation of the French administration, the life of the Tamils of Pondicherry, conflicts over caste, commercial conditions, and the suffering of the Tamil population in wartime.

Ananda Ranga Pillai traded in cloth, yarn, indigo and arecanut with Manila, Mocha and Mascareigne. He had his own ship, Anandappuravi, which sailed on long trading voyages on high seas.

Ananda Ranga Pillai's house in Pondicherry, which is located in a street named after the dubash, was one of the few buildings to survive the Siege of Pondicherry in 1760. It was recently recognized as a heritage monument by the Government of Puducherry. The mansion is known for its unique blend of Indian and French architecture: the ground floor being built in Indian fashion, while the columns which supported the terrace followed the French architectural style.

A diary maintained by Muthu Vijaya Tiruvengadam Pillai, grandson of Ananda Ranga Pillai, related the period from 1794 to 1796 was translated and published on 30 March 2000.

== Patronage of arts ==
Ananda Ranga Pillai patronized the Hindu religion, arts and poetry. And in return, poets praised Pillai in their works. Tamil poet Namasivaya Pulavar, who also wrote a verse in praise of Ananda Ranga's father, Tiruvenkadam Pillai, wrote that Ananda Ranga was as learned as the thousand-headed Adisesha serpent. Madurakkavirayar wrote that when he saw Ananda Ranga Pillai, he beheld the whole town of Pondicherry in him who was generous enough to offer him all the wealth that he wanted. Kasturi Rangaiyan wrote an ode composed in Telugu.

Tyagaraja Desikar wrote Ananda Rangan Kovai, a poem of 400 lines in praise of Ananda Ranga Pillai. This work, it is believed, took 16 years to complete and was presented to the dubash in the year 1755. In the poem, Tyagaraja venerated Ananda Ranga as the sovereign whose kingdom extended from Gingee to Vijayapuram and Delhi and praised him for the "conquest of Vanga, Kalinga and Telinga". Pillai, in turn, gifted Tyagaraja with costly ornaments, money and land.

== Discovery and translation of the diaries ==
On Ananda Ranga Pillai's death, the diaries came into the possession of his nephew Tiruvengadam Pillai who appears to have maintained a series of records of his own until the beginning of 1770. Subsequent generations of the family had discarded it until the manuscript was recovered in a decrepit state by Gallois-Montbrun, the Mayor of Pondicherry, a scholar of Oriental languages, in 1846, who immediately set upon translating the manuscript to French. However, when the translated manuscript was being edited a number of gaps were discovered The gaps were supplemented when volumes one and two of Ananda Ranga Pillai's diary were found. These were subsequently translated into French in 1870 and 1889. In 1894, Julien Vinson, Professor of the Special School of Livino-Oriental Languages at Paris who had published the second translation (which was, obviously, incomplete) published a supposed full translation of Ananda Ranga Pillai's diaries titled Les Français dans l'Inde, In 1892, the existence of the diary was brought to the notice of Lieutenant General H. Macleod, the British Consular Agent in Pondicherry. At the direction of Lord Wenlock, the then Governor of Madras, an English translation of the diary from Gallois-Montbrun's copy was attempted. This was completed in 1896. An Indian edition in 12 volumes was released by Agani Publishers of Puducherry on 5 January 2020.

== See also ==
- Pachaiyappa Mudaliar
- Pedro Kanakaraya Mudaliar
- French India

== Notes ==
Preceded by Kanakaraya Mudali	Chief dubash of French India; 1748–1756	Succeeded by Tiruvengadam Pillai
