= Gooty =

- Town
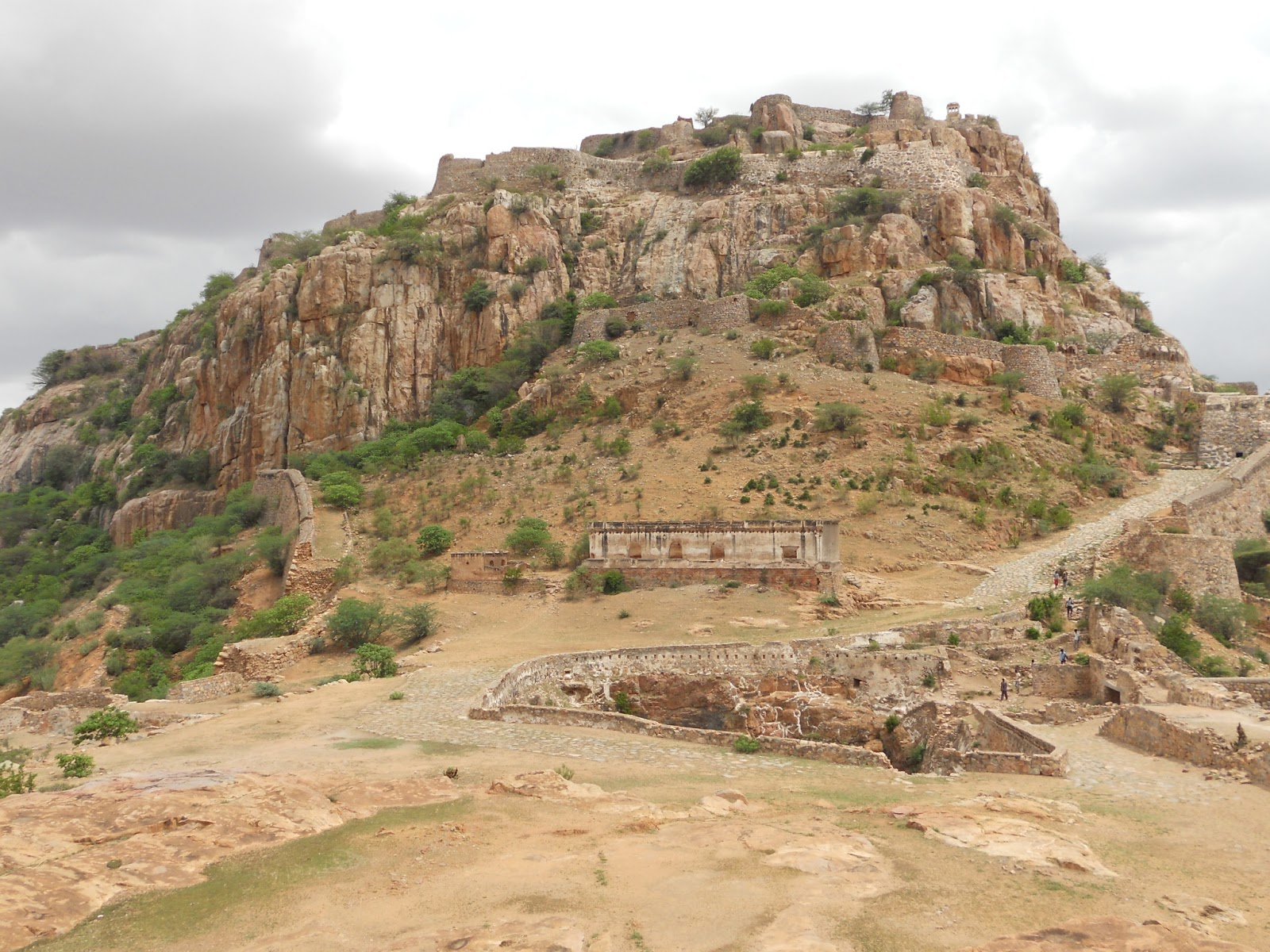
- Gooty Fort

- Location in Andhra Pradesh, India
- Coordinates: 15.121°N 77.634°E
- Country: India
- State: Andhra Pradesh
- District: Anantapur

Area
  - Total: 34.84 km^{2} (13.45 sq mi)

Population (2011)
  - Total: 48,658
  - Density: 1,397/km^{2} (3,617/sq mi)

Languages
  - Official: Telugu
- Time zone: UTC+5:30 (IST)
- PIN: 515401
- Vehicle registration: AP
- Website: gooty.cdma.ap.gov.in/en

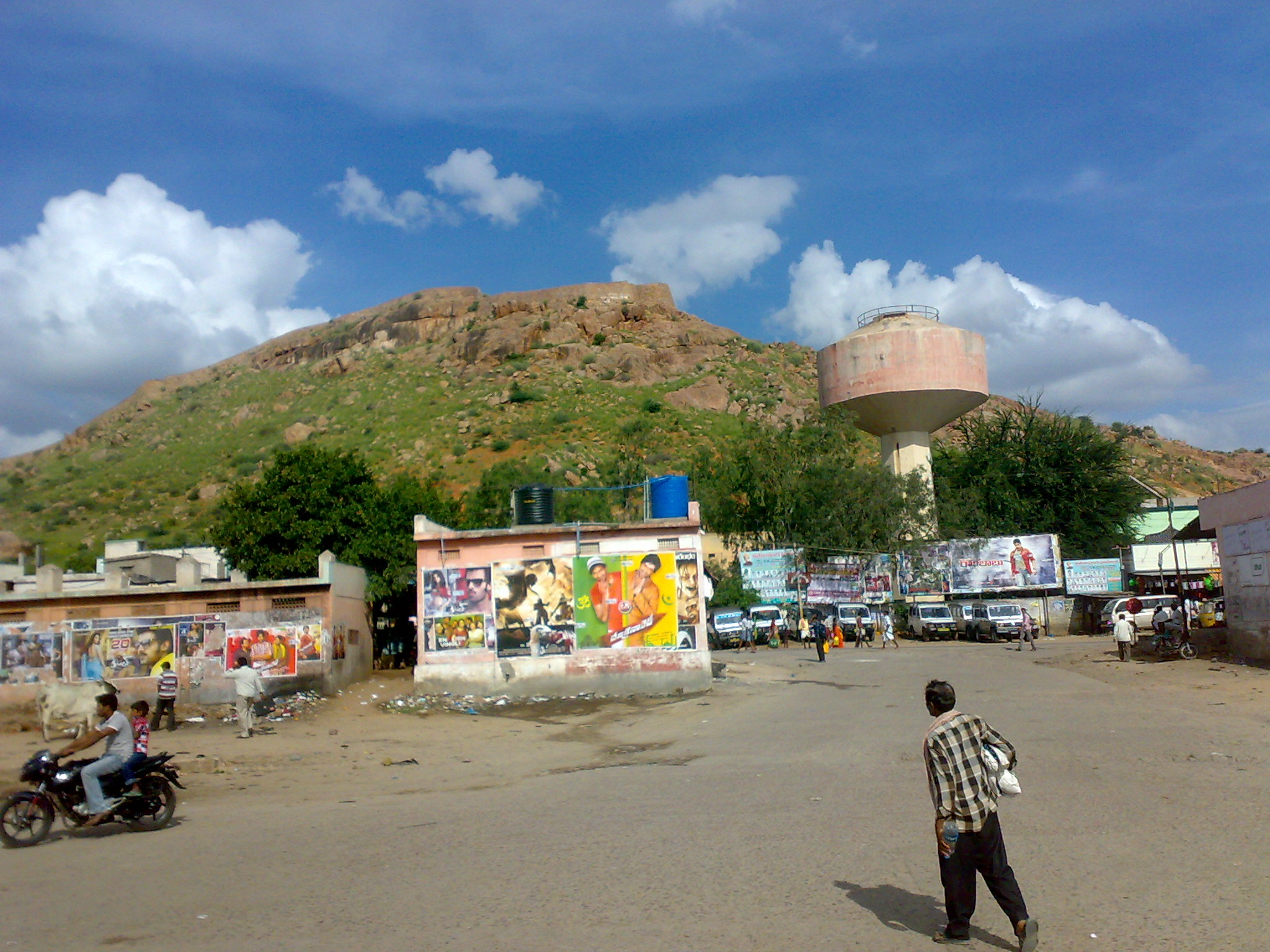
Gooty Fort view from road

Gooty (/ˈɡʊθɪ/ GUUTH-ee; Telugu: గుత్తి, transliterated as Guththi) is a town in Anantapur district of the Indian state of Andhra Pradesh. It is the mandal headquarters of Gooty mandal in Ananthapuramu revenue division. The town is renowned for the Gooty hill fort.

== Geography ==
Gooty is located at 15.12°N 77.63°E, at a distance of 52 km from Anantapur. It has an average elevation of 345 metres (1131 feet).

Earlier, Gooty was under the Vijayanagara Empire, later they abandoned Gooty Fort, Marathas took over fort they ruled through sandoor Gorpades till British left India.

== History ==
Eight inscriptions have been found on the rocks close to the Narasimha temple located within the fort premises. These inscriptions are seriously damaged, but appear to be from the reign of the Western Chalukya king Vikramaditya VI (r. c. 1076–1126 CE). The earliest of the existing fortifications and other structures can be dated to the late Chalukya period.

The fort later came under the control of the Vijayanagara Empire. During the reign of Venkata II (r. c. 1584–1614), the Vijayanagara lost the fort to the Qutb Shahi dynasty. The Mughals appear to have controlled the fort after their conquest of the Qutb Shahi capital Golconda. Around 1746 CE, the Maratha general Murari Rao captured the fort, and made it his permanent residence eight years later. He repaired the fort, and commissioned the stucco ornamentation of the small gateways.

In 1775 CE, the Mysore ruler Hyder Ali attacked and besieged the fort. After two months, Murari Rao was forced to surrender, as he ran out of water supplies. The fort later came under the control of the East India Company. Its administrator Thomas Munro was buried at the cemetery located at the foothill.

== Demographics ==
As of 2011 census, had a population of 48,658. The total population constitute, 23,943 males and 24,715 females —a sex ratio of 1032 females per 1000 males. 5,216 children are in the age group of 0–6 years, of which 2,662 are boys and 2,554 are girls —a ratio of 959 per 1000. The average literacy rate stands at 76.91% with 33,411 literates.

== Government and politics ==
Gooty was constituted as III-Grade municipality on 3 September 2011. The total income earned per annum for the FY (2010–2011) was ₹161.46 crore (US$17 million) and the expenditure spent by the municipality for the same year was ₹173.11 crore (US$18 million).

== Transport ==
Bus and train facilities available to the major cities Bangalore, Hyderabad, Chennai. The Andhra Pradesh State Road Transport Corporation operates bus services from Gooty bus station. Gooty railway station is located on the Guntakal–Chennai Egmore section, which is part of Mumbai – Chennai railway route, it is home to one of the 5 diesel locomotive sheds in the South Central Railways (SCR). Gooty Junction railway station is situated on the Bangalore – Hyderabad National Highway 7 (India, old numbering) or 44, Ankola–Bellary–Gooty National Highway NH 63, Gulbarga–Gooty National Highway (in process w.e.f 23/01/2014). Diesel Loco Shed, Gooty is home to diesel locomotives of the ALCO WDG-2A, WDG-3A, WDM-3A and WDM-3D classes.

== Education ==
The primary and secondary school education is imparted by government, aided and private schools, under the School Education Department of Andhra Pradesh. Higher education facility bachelor's degree (BTech, Bsc, Bcom, BA) / master's degree(MCA, MBA).
