= Jeanne Dupleix =

Jeanne Dupleix (1706–1756) (née Albert) was the wife of Joseph François Dupleix, governor general of the French establishment in India in 1742-1754, and known for her influence during his tenure. She acted as his political advisor and is known to have influenced his policy against non-Christians. She was known to the Indians as Joanna Begum (Jân Begum).

== Family ==
She was born in 1706 at Pondicherry to Jacques-Théodore Albert and Élisabeth-Rose de Castro, and baptized on 2 June 1706.

Her father was from Paris. He was the surgeon of Company at Pondicherry. Her mother, Rosa de Castro, was a creole of partly Italian, partly Portuguese and Indian parentage from Madras. Rosa de Castro's father was Portuguese whereas her mother was a local woman. She had five sisters and two brothers.

She married a Mr. Vincens, one of the superior councillors of the Company, on 5 June 1719. He died at Chandannagar 26 September 1739 at the age of 60. On 17 April 1741, she married Dupleix who was President of Superior Council of Pondicherry and General Commandent of French Possessions in India.

=== Children ===
She had 11 children (5 boys and 6 girls) with Mr. Vincens.

1. Jaques-François born in 1720.
2. Pierre-Benoit born in 1721.
3. Marie Rose born in 1722, married Coyle de Barneval in 1738.
4. Jean-Baptiste-Pierre born in 1724.
5. Jeanne born in 1726, died in the same year.
6. Anne-Christine-Françoise born in 1727, married Duval d'Esprémesnil in 1743.
7. Jeanne Ursule born in 1728, married Corneille de Schonamille in 1743.
8. Éléonore born in 1730, died in 1731.
9. François-Joseph born in 1731, died in the same year.
10. Pierre-François-Xavier born in 1734.
11. Marie-François-Xavier born in 1736, familiarly known as chonchon. She was proposed to marry the Mogul Emperor in 1751, but married Marquis de Bussy in 1754.

After marriage with Dupleix, she gave birth to her 12th child, a boy. The infant was named Joseph as his father, but he died the same day.

== Political influence ==
She was the political adviser of her husband Dupleix during his entire administration of French India. Her antagonism to the native princes of India was seen in action during her husband's negotiations with them.

=== Religious Persecution ===
From the Private Diary of Ananda Ranga Pillai, it can be confirmed that she indulged in religious persecution against local Hindus. Few extracts from his diary confirm this.

- Thursday 17th, March 1746,

"On Wednesday night at.11, two unknown persons entered the Iswaran temple carrying in a vessel liquid filth, which they poured on the heads of the gods around the altar, and into the temple, through the drain of the shrine of Iswaran; and having broken the pot of dirt on the image of the god Nandi, they went away through a part of the building which had been demolished...."

- Saturday 31st, December 1746,

"It was reported tonight at 7 that an earthen jar filled with filth was thrown from within the grounds of the church of St.Paul into the temple of Vedapuriswaran. It very nearly fell on the head of Shankar Aiyan, who was at the shrine of the God Pillaiyar on his way round the temple in the performance of his religious duties. When the jar struck the ground and broke to pieces the stench emitted was unbearable ... the temple was now doomed to destruction...."

- Sunday 8th, September 1750,

"Yesterday 200 soldiers, 60 or 70 troopers and sepoys were stationed at St Paul’s Church in view of the matter on hand. This morning, M Gerbault (the engineer), the priests with diggers, masons, coolies and other 200 in all, with spades, pickaxes and whatever needed to demolish walls began to pull down the southern wall of the Vedpuri Ishwaran Temple and the outhouses. At once the temple manager, Braahmans and mendicants came and told me ... Just then ... news was brought that Father COEURDOUX, the superior of St. Paul’S church had kicked the inner shrine with his foot and had ordered the Coffrees to remove the doors and the Christians to break the Vaahanams ...(Pillai now went to Governor Dupliex in an attempt to save the temple as did the other caste leaders who sought to save the temple’s movable articles but it was all to no avail)"

"...then Father COEURDOUX of Karikal came with a great hammer, kicked the Lingam, broke it with his hammer, and ordered the Coffrees and the Europeans to break the images of Vishnu and other gods. Madame Dupleix went and told the priest that he might break the idols as he pleased. He answered that she had accomplished what had been impossible for fifty years, that she must be one of those Mahatma (great soul) who established this Christian religion in old days and he would publish her fame through the world ... Then the native convert Varlam also kicked the great Lingam nine or ten times with his sandals in the presence of Madame and the priest and spat on it out of gladness and hoping that the priest and Madame will also regard him as Mahatma. Then he followed Madame. I can neither write nor describe what abominations were done in the temple..."

...Before M.Dupleix was made Governor, and when he was only a councillor, all the Europeans and few Tamils used to say that if he becomes governor, he would destroy the Eswaran Temple. The saying has come to pass. Ever since his appointment he is seeking to do so, but he had no opportunity. He tried to get Muttayya Pillai to do it in May May or June 1743. But the later would not consent, though the Governor threatened to cut his ears off and beat him publicly and even to hang him...

Ananda Ranga Pillai quotes about her in his Private Diary,

I have heard and read in books also, extraordinary accounts of the cunningness of the women. But Madame Dupleix surpasses them all a thousand times. The Europeans, both men and women, Hindus and Muhammadans alike, all curse her as a pupil of devil who will ruin the town.

== Death ==
She died at Paris on 4 December 1756 at the age of 50. Her funeral was performed on next day at the Parish Marie Magdaleine de la Ville l'Évêque.

== Bibliography ==
- George Bruce Malleson (1 January 1999). Dupleix. Rulers of India series. Adamant Media Corporation. ISBN 978-0-543-92442-1.
