= Battle of Arnee =

1751 battle during the Second Carnatic War

Coordinates: 12°41′N 79°17′E

- Part of the Second Carnatic War
Date	3 December 1751
Location	Arnee (now Arani, Tamil Nadu)
Result	British-Maratha victory

Belligerents
(Kingdom of Great Britain) Great Britain; British East India Company; Maratha Empire	Kingdom of France; French East India Company; Nawab of Arcot (Chanda Sahib)

Commanders and leaders
Robert Clive (Maratha Empire) Murari Rao	Chanda Sahib; Raza Sahib

Strength
1,100; 200 British regulars 300 Sepoys; 600 Marathas	4,800; 300 French; 2,500 Arcot Infantry, 2,000 Arcot Cavalry

Casualties and losses
c. A dozen Sepoys killed or injured	50 French killed or injured 150 Indians killed or injured

The Battle of Arnee (or Battle of Arni) occurred on 3 December 1751 during the Second Carnatic War. A British-led force under the command of Robert Clive defeated and routed a much larger Franco-Indian force under the command of Raza Sahib.

== Background ==
The loss of the capital Arcot significantly damaged the prestige of Chandra Sahib and his French allies. Despite the victory, the Carnatic region remained highly contested in the ongoing struggle for hegemony between the British and the French.*

== Battle ==
Less than three weeks after Arcot, Clive encounter the Franco-Indian force near the small town of Arni, about twenty miles south of Arcot on December 3. Raza Sahib's army, having retired to nearby Vellore, had been reinforced by the French. On the other hand, Clive's forces had been supplemented by the Marathas under Morari Rao, who had been convinced that the price offered for their participation was high enough.

Clive drew his men up in a defensive position on a small hill behind flooded rice fields with only a narrow causeway for access. On the right he deployed his sepoys in the shelter of a small village, and on the left the Maratha cavalry in a palm grove. On midday, French and Indian forces attacked Clive under cover from several cannons firing on the British position. Clive's artillery fire proved more effective and forced the French vanguard to move along the causeway with their artillery, making them easy targets for Clive's guns.

As Raza Sahib's forces approached the village, they came under intense fire from the sepoys and retreated to take shelter in the lower rice fields, where they became bogged down under fire. Panic set in and they floundered about in disarray and retreated. To the left, however, a contingent of Raza Sahib's troops advanced towards the Maratha position. The Marathas launched one cavalry charge after another to push them back, the well-disciplined French-led troops repulsed them up to five times.

Clive ordered two guns forward to support the Marathas; in the rush, the ammunition was forgotten, and Clive had to order the gunners to retreat to fetch it – but to do so slowly, so as not to give the impression that the British were retreating. Puzzled by the maneuver, French commanders assumed that Clive had ordered reinforcements to capture their exposed guns on the causeway. Raza Sahib ordered part of his force away from the left flank to secure them, which the Marathas immediately exploited by launching a successful attack on the French and Indian cavalry and driving them back. Concurrently, the sepoys now attacked the French reinforcements sent to protect the guns, who were already trapped by musket fire from the protected positions in the village.

The remainder of Clive's forces on the hill now attacked the troops down the causeway. At first, the French and Indians fought back furiously and tried to make a stand three times, but they were relentlessly pushed back. The Marathas forced them back on their left flank, and succeeded in capturing Raza Sahib's war chest of 100,000 rupees; the Maratha attacks continued to the night, when Clive's forces finally broke off the assault. By dawn on the next day, Sahib's forces were gone. Their baggage, along with the dead and wounded strewn about the battlefield.

== Aftermath ==
Unlike the successful defence of Arcot, Clive's victory at Arni was won in an open battle through tactics, discipline and resourcefulness. Following the battle, hundreds of opposing sepoys defected to Clive's force and were accepted into its ranks. Clive believed that the victories at Arcot and Arni had sufficiently secured the British position in the region, allowing him to return to Madras.

== Bibliography ==
- Faught, C. Brad (2013). Clive: Founder of British India. Dulles Town Center, VA: Potomac Books.
- Harvey, Robert (2014). Clive: The Life and Death of a British Emperor. Thomas Dunne Books.
- Sandler, Stanley L. (ed.) (2002). Ground Warfare: An International Encyclopedia, volume 1. Oxford, England: ABC-CLIO.
