= Battle of Seringham =

1753 battle

- Part of Second Carnatic War
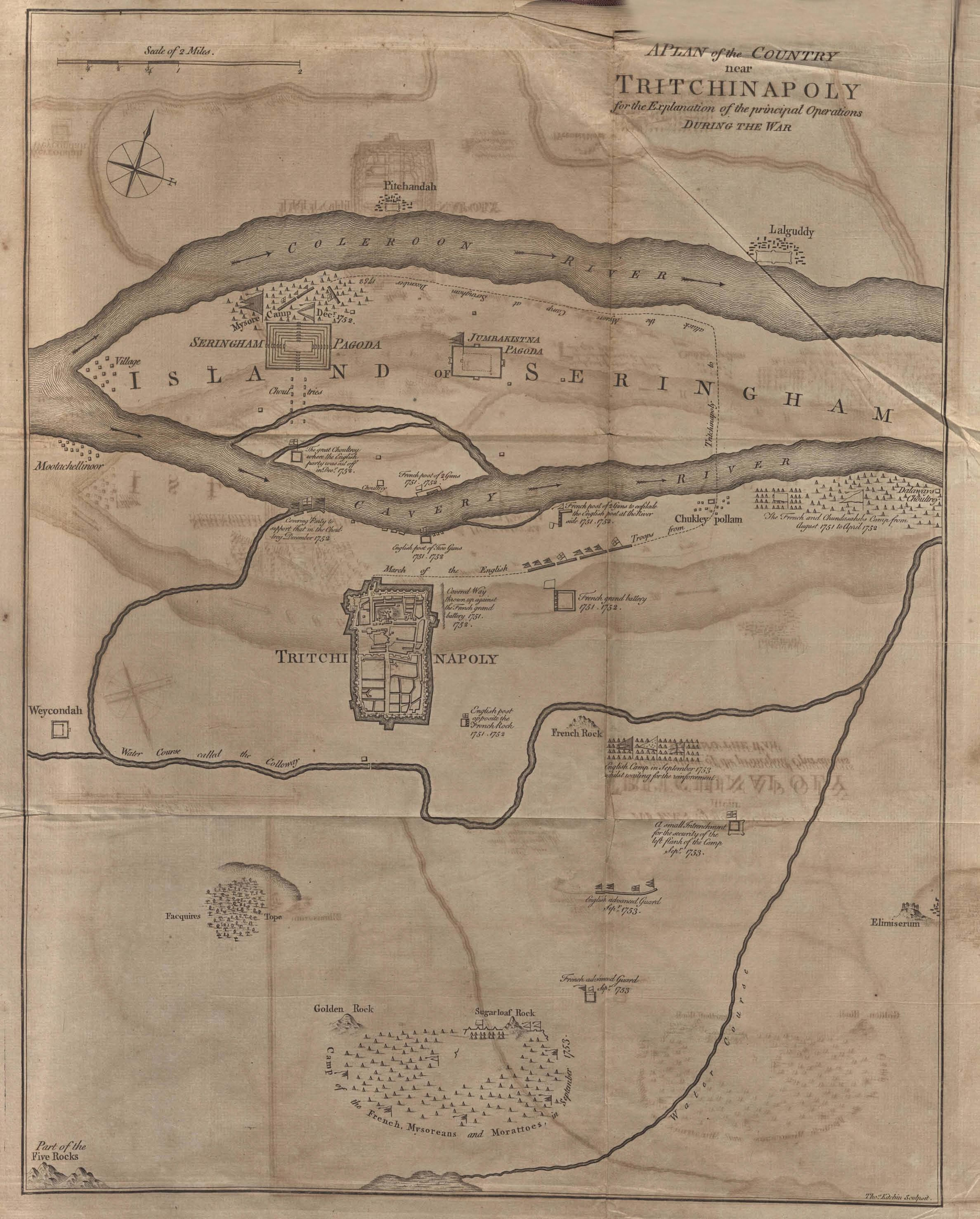
- Island of Seringham During Second Carnatic War
Date	12 April – 8 June 1753
Location	Srirangam, near Trichinopoly, India 10°31′N 78°25′E
Result	British–Maratha victory

Belligerents
Great Britain: East India Company; Maratha Empire: Thanjavur Marathas	France: French East India Company; Nawab of Arcot

Commanders and leaders
Stringer Lawrence; Robert Clive; Captain Dalton; Murari Rao; Manoji (Thanjavur)	Law (surrendered) d'Auteil (surrendered); Chanda Sahib (executed) (surrendered)

Strength
1,000 troops	620 troops (French), 700 sepoys (French)

Casualties and losses
	758 French soldiers, 2,000 sepoys
- Chanda Sahib killed after his surrender

The Battle of Seringham was fought on the island of Srirangam between 1,000 troops of the British East India Company commanded by Stringer Lawrence and a confederacy of French East India Company troops and Chanda Sahib.

== Prelude ==
Following their victory at Bahour, the British East India Company troops entered the city of Trichinopoly and took position there. Contrary to the orders from Dupleix to fall back on Pondicherry, French troops under the Scotsman Law retreated at once to the island of Srirangam to the north of Trichinopoly and planned to attack and oust the British from Trichinopoly.

On 12 April 1753, Lawrence sent a detachment of 400 men under Captain Dalton to attack Chanda Sahib's troops and drive them out. But with scanty knowledge of the place and the terrain, Dalton and his men were caught unaware by Law who, however panicked, allowed them to retreat safely. Law, then decided to implement his strategy of retreating to Seringham, also known as Srirangam.

== Events ==
Soon after the retreat of the French forces, the British troops advanced and on 17 April 1753, captured Samayapuram to the north of Srirangam. The French troops were now completely encircled.

On 10 April 1753, d'Auteil set up at the head of 620 troops to relieve Law. On 25 April, he reached Utatur, 50 miles (80 km) north of Samayapuram. d'Auteil proceeded to the Coleroon river avoiding Clive's army and sent a messenger to inform Law of his movements but the messenger was captured by Clive who forced him to retreat to Utatur. Taking advantage of Clive's departure from Samayapuram, Law sent a force of 80 Europeans and 700 sepoys to take Samayapuram but was repulsed.

Following this incident, the Thanjavur Maratha allies of the British East India Company took Coiladdy on 7 May 1753. On 20 May 1753, Stringer Lawrence sent an army of 1050 troops under Captain Dalton to Utatur forcing d'Auteil at fall back on Pondicherry. Law attacked Dalton's troops but was repulsed and retreated to Srirangam once again. On 8 June 1753, Clive attacked d'Auteil at Volcondah and forced him to surrender along with his army.

With the situation turning desperate, Law and Chanda surrendered 758 French soldiers and 2000 sepoys. Chanda had agreed to pay the commander of the Kingdom of Tanjore, Manaji, for safe passage. However, immediately upon reaching the Manaji's camp, Chanda Sahib was seized and eventually beheaded.
