= Gooty Fort =

Ruined hill fort in Gooty, Andhra Pradesh, India

- Anantapur district, Andhra Pradesh; Near Gooty in India
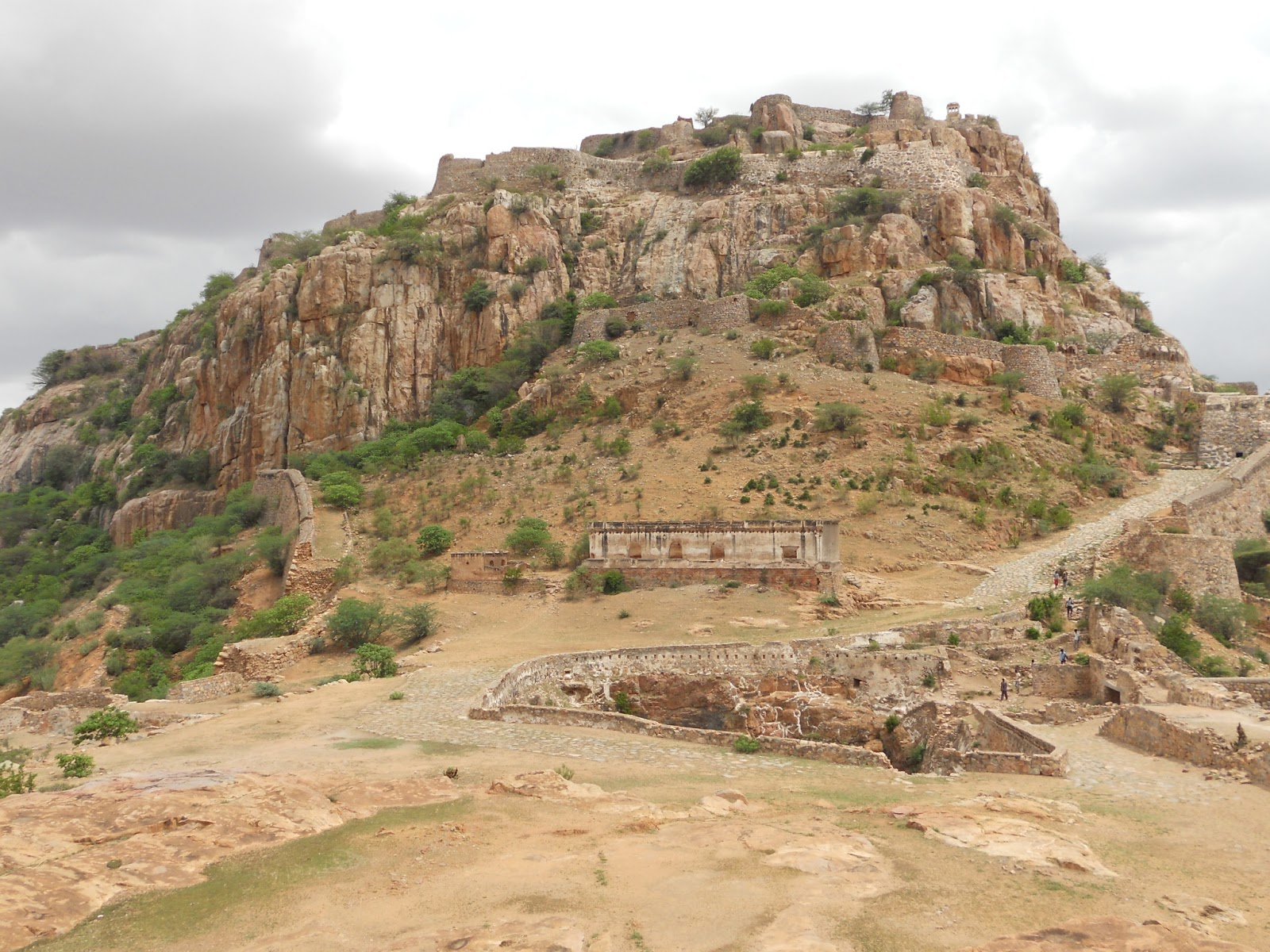

Site information
- Type: Fortress

Location
- Location in Andhra Pradesh, India Gooty Fort (India)
- Coordinates: 15.1133979°N 77.6514648°E

Garrison information
- Past commanders: Murari Rao, Thomas Munro

The Gooty Fort, also known as Ravadurg and Gutti Kota, is a ruined fort located on a hill in the Gooty town of Andhra Pradesh, India. The town of Gooty (originally, "Gutti") is located in the Ananthapur district of Andhra Pradesh. It is one of the centrally protected monuments of national importance.

== History ==
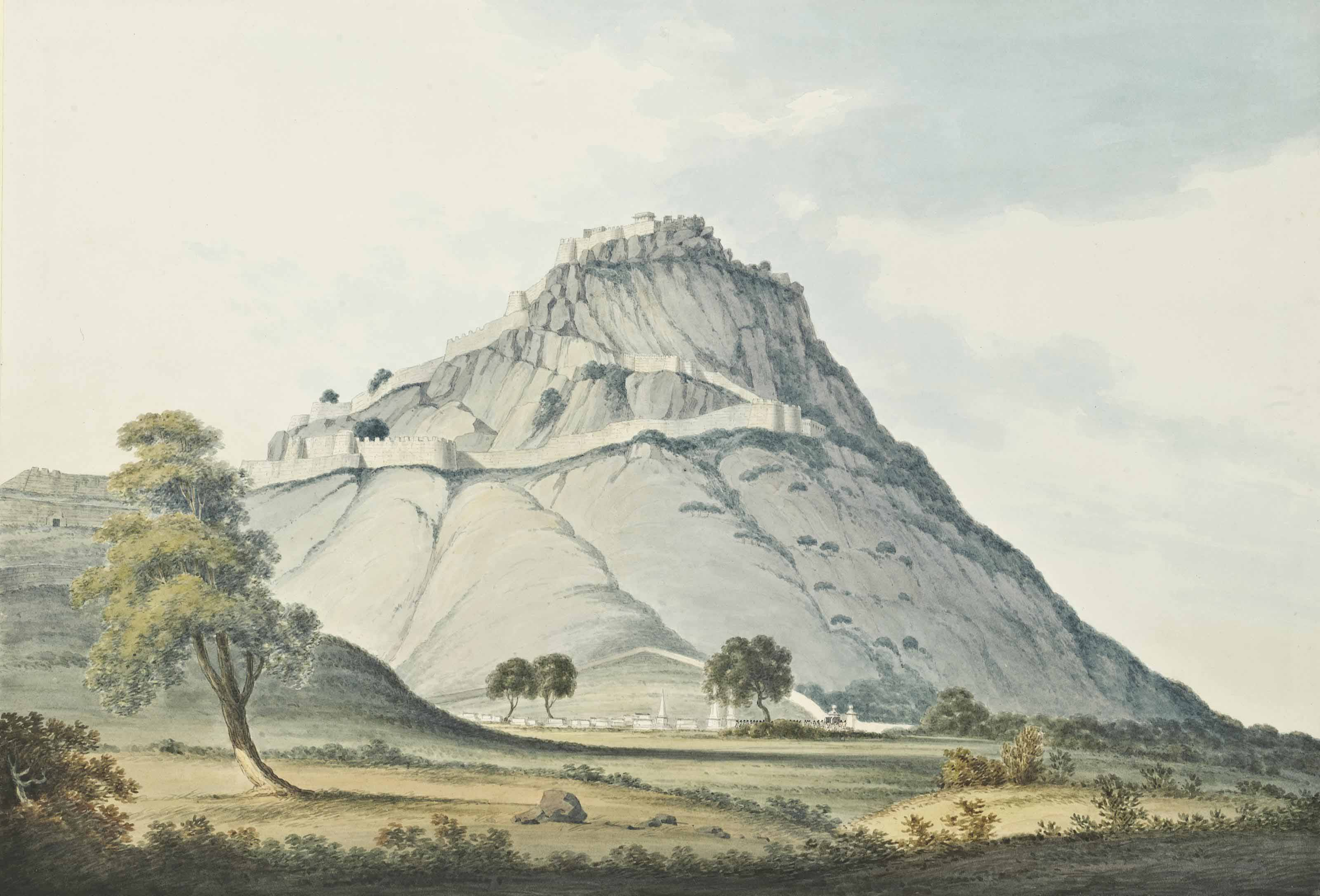
Gooty Fort, Andhra Pradesh

Eight inscriptions have been found on the rocks near to the Narasimha temple situated within the fort premises. These inscriptions are seriously damaged, but appear to be from the reign of the Western Chalukya king Vikramaditya VI (r. c. 1076-1126 CE). The earliest of the existing fortifications and other structures can be dated to the late Chalukya period.

The fort later came under the control of the Vijayanagara Empire. During the reign of Venkata II (r. c. 1584-1614), the Vijayanagara lost the fort to the Qutb Shahi dynasty. The Mughals appear to have controlled the fort after their conquest of the Qutb Shahi capital Golconda. Around 1746 CE, the Maratha general Raja Murarirao Ghorpade captured the fort, and made it his permanent residence eight years later. He repaired the fort, and commissioned the stucco ornamentation of the small gateways.

In 1775 CE, the Mysore ruler Hyder Ali attacked and besieged the fort. After two months, Murari Rao was forced to surrender, as he ran out of water supplies. The fort later came under the control of the East India Company. Its administrator Thomas Munro was buried at the cemetery located at the foothill.

== Architecture ==
The fort is located on a group of hills that rise up to 680 m above the sea level. The hills are connected by lower spurs. The citadel of the fort is located on the westernmost hill. It has only one entrance known as "Mar Gooty." The summit of the citadel has two buildings, apparently a granary and a gunpowder magazine. The ruined Narasimha temple is located near the summit. On a 300 m high cliff, there is a small pavilion called "Murari Rao's seat", which provides a panoramic view of the town below. It is said that the Maratha general Murarirao Ghorpade used to play chess and swing here.

The lower fortifications comprise a series of ramparts, which are connected by gateways and flanked by bastions. Numerous reservoirs excavated on the rock clefts were used to trap the seasonal rainwater. 108 wells were also dug within the fort walls.

There are several ruined buildings within the fort, including granaries, storerooms, and magazines. Some of these were used as prisons by the East India Company administrator Thomas Munro.
