= Murari Rao =

Maratha general (1699–1779)

- Senapati; Hindurao

Raja of Sandur
- Reign: 1731 – 8 May 1779
- Predecessor: Sidhoji Ghorpade
- Successor: Sidhoji II
- Born: 1699; Sandur, Maratha Empire (present-day Sanduru, Karnataka, India)
- Died: 8 May 1779 (aged 79–80); Kabbaldurga, Mysore Kingdom (present-day Kabbaldurga, Karnataka, India)
- Spouse: Sagunabai
- House: Ghorpade
- Father: Hindu Rao
- Religion: Hinduism
- Military career
- Conflicts: Maratha–Nizam Wars: Siege of Trichinopoly; Siege of Trichinopoly; Maratha–Mysore wars: Battle of Ooscota; Carnatic wars: Siege of Arcot; Battle of Arnee; Battle of Seringham; Siege of Trichinopoly

Murari Rao (Murari Rao Ghorpade, Marathi pronunciation: [muɾaːɾiɾaːʋ ɡʱoːɾpəɖeː]; 1699 – 8 May 1779) was a Maratha general and statesman who held Gooty and the surrounding territories, which extended eastward to Madras and Pondicherry. From 1741 to 1743, he administered the fort of Tiruchirappalli and its surrounding regions. He was the grandnephew of Santaji Ghorpade and served as the chief of Sandur, a cadet branch of the Ghorpades of Mudhol.

Murari Rao's administration represents the only period of Maratha occupation in Tiruchirappalli. Murari Rao occupied Tiruchirappalli at the head of a strong Maratha army after defeating and imprisoning the Carnatic general, Chanda Sahib, in 1741 with the help of Raghuji I. However, he was forced to relinquish the fort by Asaf Jah. The Nizam sieged Trichinopoly for four months, and after receiving no reinforcements, Murari Rao was eventually bought off by the Nizam and handed the fort over to him on 29 August 1743. Murari Rao was a disciple and an ardent devotee of Satyabodha Tirtha Swami of Uttaradi Matha. Murari Rao Ghorpade was the founder of the Ghati Subramanya Temple and the Makalidurga Fort.

== Assistance to Nayaks of Chitradurg ==
In 1748, the Chief of Harapanahalli, a traditional adversary of Chitradurga, besieged the fort of Mayakonda, a stronghold of Chitradurga. Aligning himself with the Nawab of Savanur and the Keladi ruler, the Harapanahalli Chief faced the Nayak of Chitradurga, who was supported by the Maratha commander Siddhoji Ghorpade of Gutti. The ensuing battle resulted in the death of the Chitradurga ruler, Madaka Nayak the Elder. In 1749, his successor, Kasturi Rangappa Nayak II, enlisted the aid of Murari Rao of Gutti, successfully lifting the siege of Mayakonda and restoring Chitradurga's control over the fort.

== Wars With Hyder Ali ==
Murari Rao also fought in battles against Hyder Ali and Tipu Sultan. He was the ruler of Sandur State till its annexation by the Mysore Sultanate. He defeated Hyder Ali in Battle of Ooscota but was later defeated and imprisoned at Kabbaldurga fort near Bangalore till his death.
