= Jeanne Albert =

American politician

Jeanne Albert is an American politician. She was elected to the Vermont House of Representatives in 2026.
