= Joseph François Dupleix =

Governor-General of French India from 1742 to 1754

Governor-General of French India
- In office 14 January 1742 – 15 October 1754
- Monarch: Louis XV
- Preceded by: Pierre Benoît Dumas
- Succeeded by: Charles Godeheu; As Acting Governor-General

Personal details
- Born: 23 January 1697 Landrecies, France
- Died: 10 November 1763 (aged 66) Paris, France
- Spouse: Jeanne Albert
- Parent: François Dupleix (father)
- Occupation: Governor-General of French India

Joseph François Dupleix (French pronunciation: [ʒozɛf fʁɑ̃swa dyplɛks]; Unknown – 10 November 1763) was Governor-General of French India and rival of Robert Clive.

== Biography ==
Dupleix was born in Landrecies, on January 23, 1697. His father, François Dupleix, a wealthy fermier général, wished to bring him up as a merchant, and, in order to distract him from his taste for science, sent him on a voyage to India in 1715 on one of the French East India Company's vessels. He made several voyages to the Americas and India, and in 1720 was named a member of the superior council at Bengal. He displayed great business aptitude, and in addition to his official duties made large ventures on his own account, acquiring a fortune.

In 1730 he was made superintendent of French affairs in Chandernagore. In 1741, he married Jeanne Albert, widow of one of the councillors of the company. Albert was known to the Hindus as Joanna Begum and proved of great help to her husband in his negotiations with the native princes.

His reputation procured him in 1742 the appointment of governor general of all French establishments in India. Dupleix saw in the constant succession disputes among the Princes of India an opportunity to advance the interests of the French in India, and for this purpose he entered into relations with the native princes, and adopted a style of oriental splendour in his dress and surroundings. He built an army of native troops, called sepoys, who were trained as infantry men in his service and also included the famous Hyder Ali of Mysore.

The British were alarmed by this, but the danger to their settlements and power was partly averted by the bitter mutual jealousy which existed between Dupleix and Bertrand François Mahé de La Bourdonnais, French governor of the Isle of Bourbon (today's La Réunion).

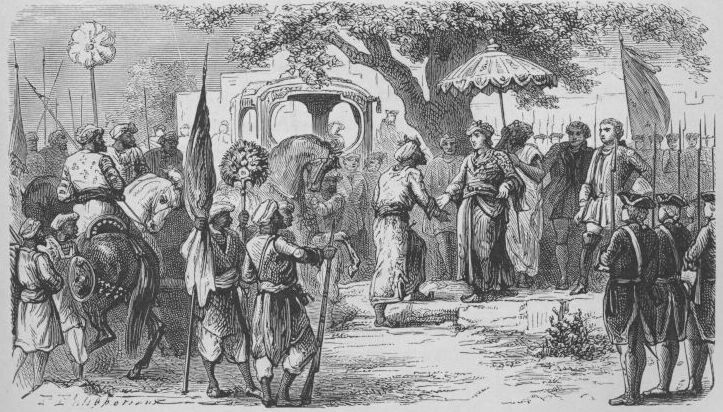
Dupleix meeting the Subadar of the Deccan, Muzaffar Jung

When the city of Madras capitulated to the French following the Battle of Madras in 1746, Dupleix opposed returning the town to British rule, thus violating the treaty signed by La Bourdonnais. He then sent an expedition against Fort St David (1747), which won over the Nawab of Arcot, ally of the British. Dupleix again attempted the capture of Fort St David, and this time succeeded.

In 1748 Calcutta was besieged by the French, but in the course of the operations news arrived of the peace concluded between the French and the British at Aix-la-Chapelle. Dupleix next entered into negotiations concerning the subjugation of southern India. He sent a large body of troops to the aid of the two claimants of the sovereignty of the Carnatic and the Deccan. The British sided with their rivals to prevent the plans of Dupleix from materializing.

In 1750 the Subadar of Deccan gifted the Alamparai Fort to the French. This was a token of his appreciation for the services rendered by Dupleix and the French forces.

From 1751, Dupleix tried to expand French influence in Burma by sending the envoy Sieur de Bruno, and by providing military assistance the Mon in their conflict with the Burmese. Bruno proved remarkably successful in this effort, resulting in closer ties between the French and the Mon. However, the advent of the Seven Years' War meant that as French attentions were elsewhere this relationship came to nothing.

In 1754 the French government, anxious to make peace, sent out to India a special commissioner with orders to supersede Dupleix and, if necessary, to arrest him. These orders were carried out harshly, what survived of Dupleix's work was ruined at a blow, and he himself was compelled to embark for France on 12 October 1754. He had spent his private fortune in the prosecution of his public policy, but the company refused to acknowledge the obligation, and the government would do nothing for a man whom they persisted in regarding as an ambitious and greedy adventurer. He died in obscurity on 10 November 1763.

== Commemoration ==
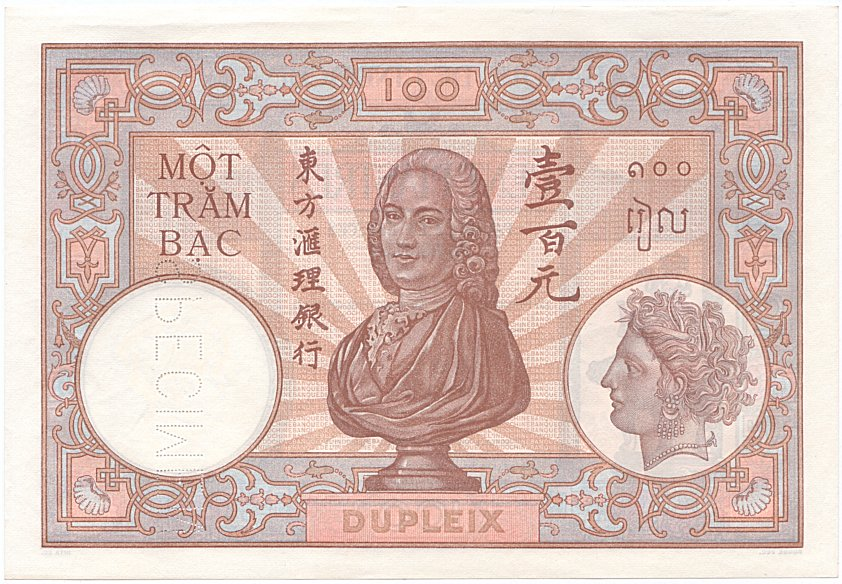
Dupleix on Banque de l'Indochine banknote

A number of things were named in his honour:

- A square, road and metro station in the 15th arrondissement of Paris are named after him.
- Four French warships have borne his name (beside two commercial ships):
  - The steam corvette Dupleix (1861–1887), famous for her involvement in the Japanese revolution
  - A 7,700-tonne armoured cruiser (1897–1919)
  - A 10,000-tonne cruiser (1929–1942), scuttled in Toulon
  - The F70 type frigate Dupleix
- College Dupleix was the former name of Kanailal Vidyamandir and the Chandannagar College in Chandannagar, West Bengal.
- A road in New Delhi near the Indian parliament named after him.
- Rue Dupleix (Dupleix Street) was the former name of Nehru Street in Pondicherry.

=== Statue of Dupleix at Puducherry Beach ===
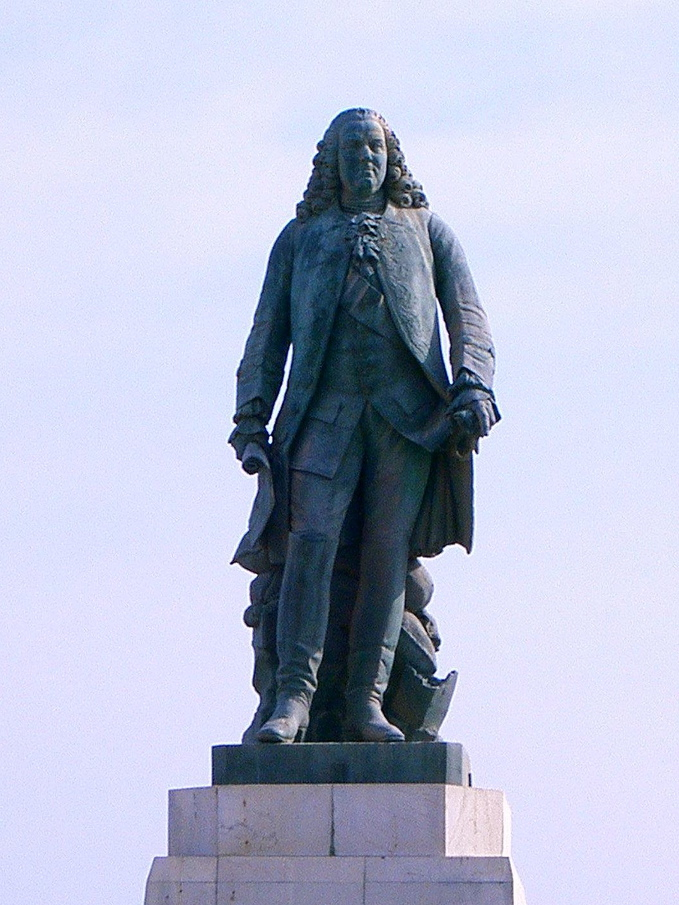
Monument to Dupleix in Puducherry

French recognition of Dupleix's contribution came only in 1870, with the commissioning of two statues – one in Puducherry and the other in France. The former statue is now situated in Goubert Avenue at the end of Rock Beach. It was first installed on 16 July 1870. In 1979 the statue was moved from the middle of the current Bharathy park to its current location at the beach.

Dupleix is represented as a man of commanding stature. In the large nose and massive under jaw, some resemblance may be traced to Oliver Cromwell as commonly represented in his portraits. In the statue, Dupleix wears court dress with bag wig and long riding boots; in his right hand is a plan of Puducherry, his left reposing on the hilt of his sword.

Restoration of the Dupleix statue was undertaken by the Public Works Department (PWD) of the government of Puducherry in 2014.

== See also ==
- Ananda Ranga Pillai
- French colonial empires
- Carnatic Wars
- France in the Seven Years' War
- Great Britain in the Seven Years' War

== Sources ==
Government offices
Preceded by Pierre Benoît Dumas	Governor-General of French India; 14 January 1742 – 15 October 1754	Succeeded by Charles Godeheu Le commissaire (Acting)
