= St. Andrew's Church, Puducherry =

St. Andrew's Church
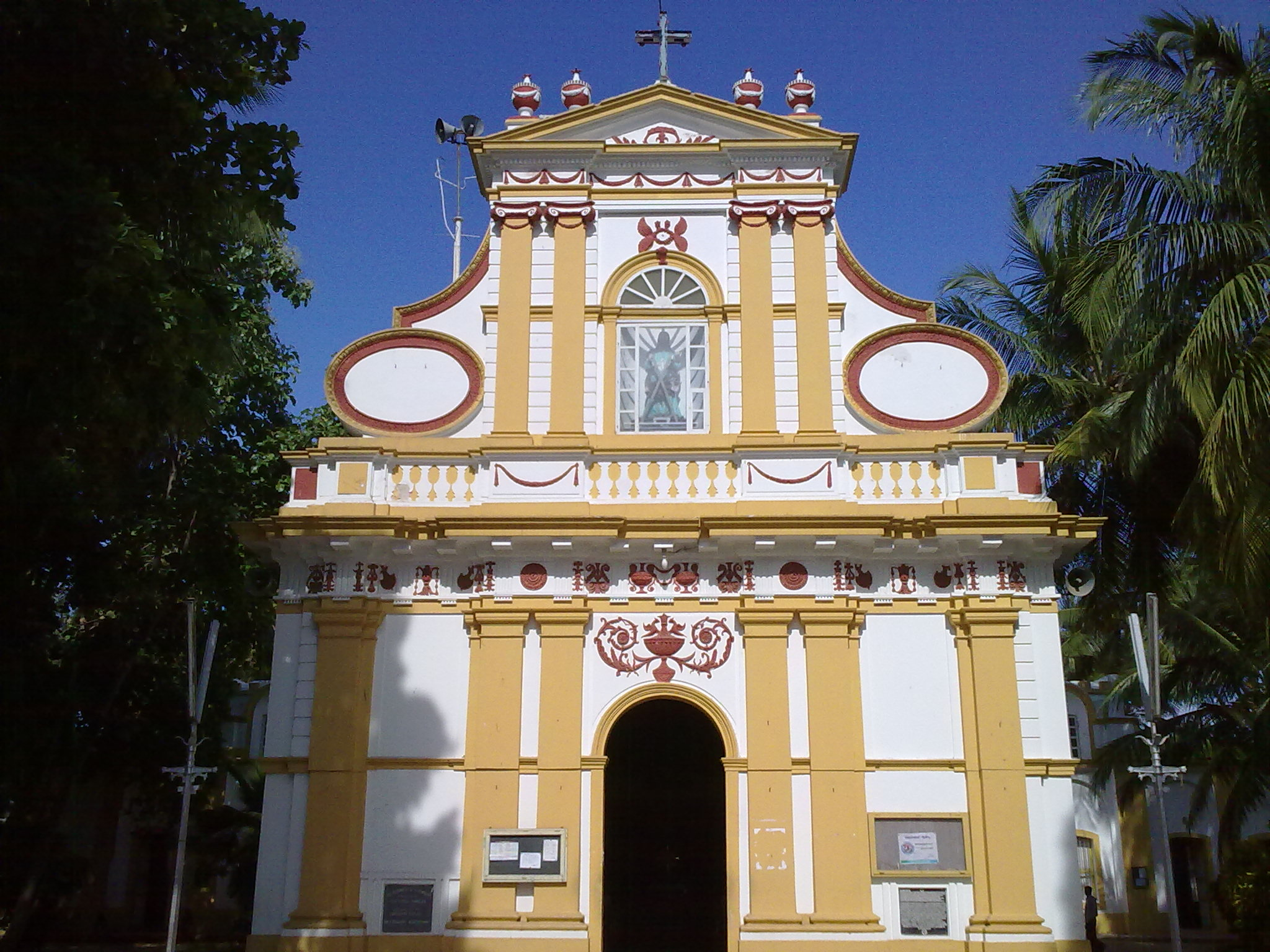
- Front view of the church

- Location within Puducherry Location within Tamil Nadu Location within India
- 11°55′54″N 79°47′40″E
- Location: Reddiarpalayam, Puducherry
- Country: India
- Denomination: Catholic
- Website: standrewschurchpondy.com/index.html

History
- Status: Parish church
- Founded: 1745

Architecture
- Functional status: Active
- Architectural type: Chapel
- Style: Gothic architecture

Administration
- Archdiocese: Archdiocese of Pondicherry and Cuddalore

St. Andrew's Church is one of the oldest churches in Reddiarpalayam area of Puducherry, a Union territory in South India. The original structure was built in Gothic architecture in 1745 by Kanakaraya Mudali, the longest serving dubash of the French East India Company. During the opening of the Church, Mudali hosted a feast that included all castes and religions, the first of its kind that is recorded in the history of South India. It is believed that the Church was destroyed by the British in 1761 and was later rebuilt in 1830. It is the first Church in South India to have an inscriptions made in Tamil during the times.

St. Andrew's Church is a working church with hourly prayer and daily services and follows Roman Catholic sect of Christianity. The chapel was controlled by Capuchin priests initially and then changed hands to Petiti Seminaire School Fathers up to 1860. In modern times, it is under the dominion of Archdiocese of Pondicherry and Cuddalore. It is one of the most prominent landmarks in Puducherry.

== Architecture ==
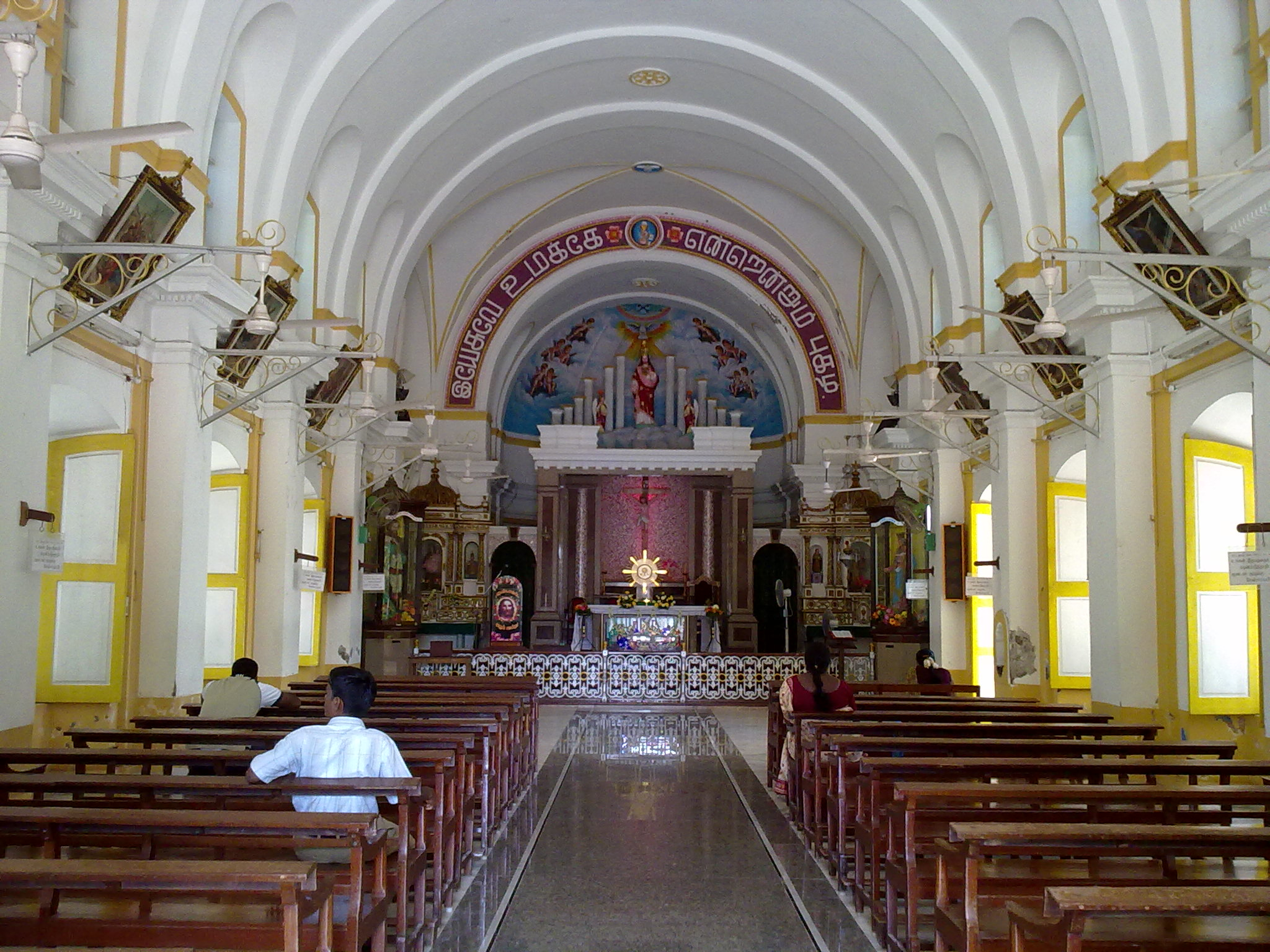
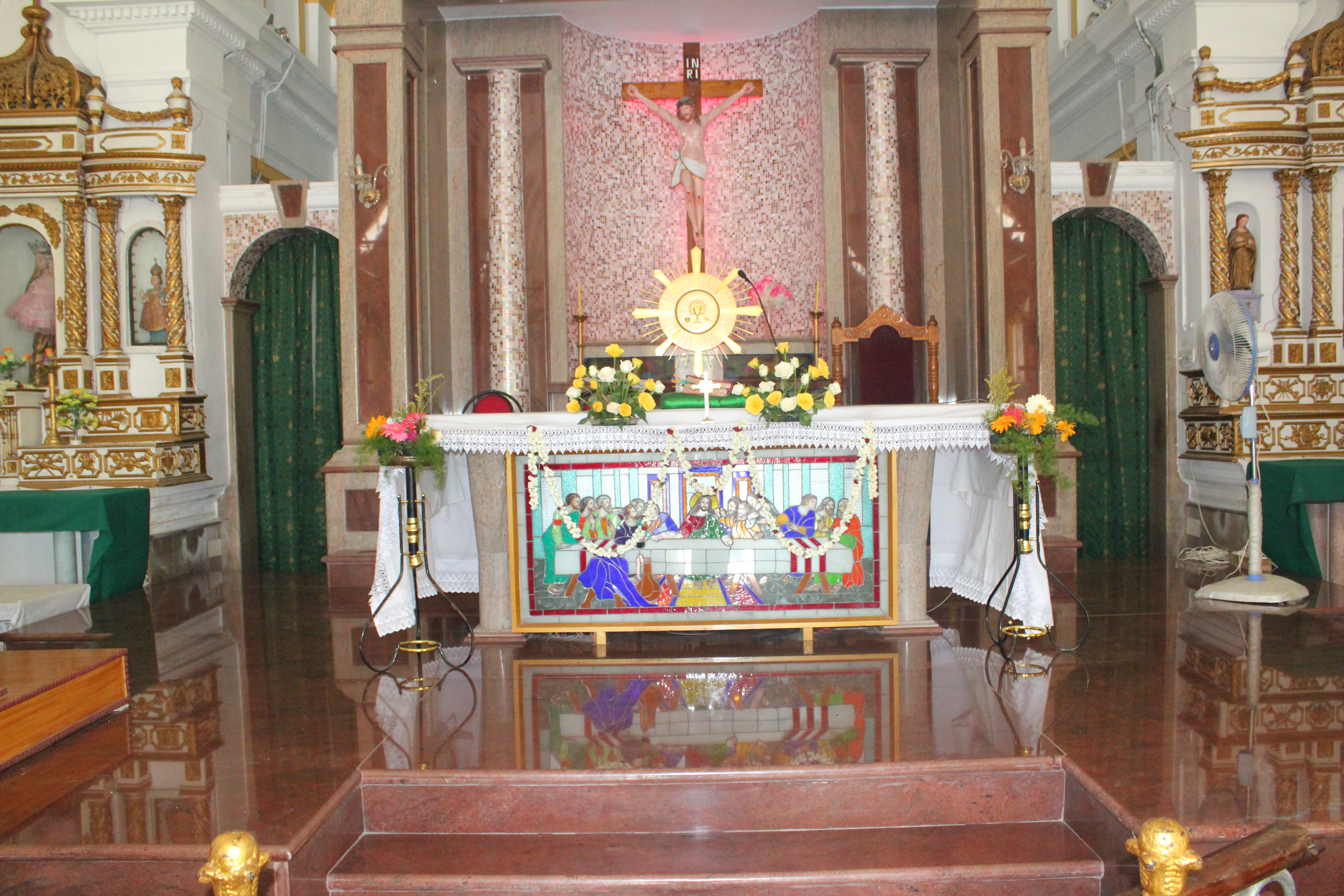
Altar of the temple

The church is built in Gothic architecture. The altar has conventional Catholic images in the altar and a vestry for the devotees. The bust size statue of Kanakaraya Mudali is housed over his tomb in the precincts of the church. The plaques of Our Lady and St. Andrew are housed in glass chambers in standing posture on either side of the altar in the walls facing the devotees. A grotto of Ou Lady of Lourdes is located outside near the entrance.

The church is believed to be the first of its kind to have an inscription in Tamil. The church is one of the most visited and a prominent landmark in the town.

== History ==
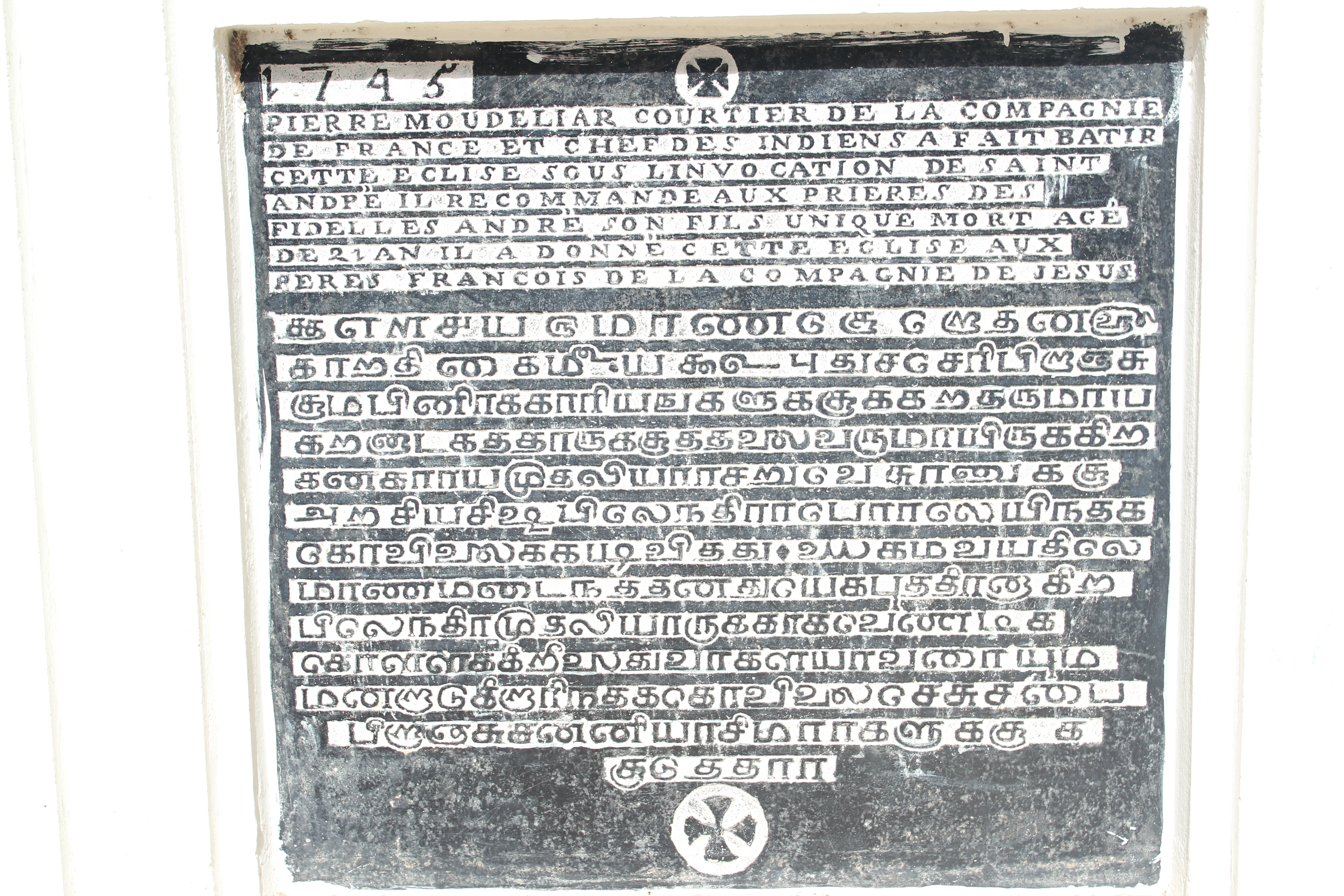
Tamil inscriptions, the oldest one found in churches in South India

The details of the church are found in the inscriptions made in the temple in Tamil, the first one of its kind in South India. Pondicherry was founded by 1674 by Francois Martin, while the French East Indian Company by Thaniappa Mudaliar in 1691 CE. The colony passed hands between the French and British colonial Empire till 1816 when it became a permanent colony of the French. Some accounts place that the church was built in 1675 by Capuchins following the Apostle St. Andrew. Other accounts place that the church was built in the fort by Father Ephraim de Nevers in 1642 as a temporary structure, which would go on to be modified as a permanent structure in 1675. As per other accounts and also the official history of the Church, it was built by Kanakaraya Mudali (1696- 1746), the grandson of Thaniyappa Mudaliyar and the longest serving dubash for the French Colonial Empire in 1745. He hosted a multi caste religious feast in the region subsequently attended by people across different castes and religions in the region. It is believed that the Church was destroyed by the British in 1761 and was later rebuilt in 1830.

== Worship practises ==
St. Andrew's Church was originally under the dominions of the cathedral and later changed hands to Petit Seminaire School Fathers up to 1860. The priests serving in the church were originally only French, but during modern times, Tamils have also been appointed. In modern times, the Church is administered by the Archdiocese of Pondicherry and Cuddalore. Mass is offered in the church from Monday to Saturday at 6 a.m. An additional Sunday Vigil Mass is offered at 5 p.m. on Saturdays. On Sundays, Mass is at 5 a.m., 6 a.m., and 5 p.m.

The feast of the namesake is commemorated on November 30 every year. But the feast of the Blessed Virgin Mary under the title Our Lady of Presentation (Note: It commemorates Our Lady at the Presentation of Jesus. Not to be confused with Presentation of Mary.) is considered the main feast of the parish. It is celebrated for eight days, starting with flag hoisting on 24 January and ending on 2 February.
