= Safdarjung's rebellion =

1753 rebellion

Date	10 May 1753
Location	Delhi
Result	Mughal-Rohillas alliance victory

Belligerents
Oudh State; Kingdom of Bharatpur	Mughal Empire; Rohilla Afghans

Commanders and leaders
Safdar Jung; Suraj Mal; Sayyid Salabat Khan Zulfiqar Jang	Ahmad Shah Bahadur; Intizam-ud-Daulah; Imad-ul-Mulk; Najib ad-Dawlah

The Safdarjung's rebellion occurred on 10 March 1753 during the waning years of the Mughal Empire. It was characterized by a conflict between Safdarjung, the Nawab of Oudh, and the Mughal emperor Ahmad Shah Bahadur, alongside his court factions.

== Background ==
Tensions between Safdarjung and Intizam-ud-Daulah, another prominent noble, had been escalating since March 1753. Emperor Ahmad Shah Bahadur lacked the authority to control these powerful nobles. Although the emperor and his mother initially ordered Safdarjung to return to his governorship in Oudh, Safdarjung delayed his departure. Eventually, on 26 March 1753, he left Delhi but, instead of returning to Oudh, set up camp just outside the city with his army. Safdarjung wavered between allying with the emperor or taking action against him.

For a time, both sides hesitated to act, but Safdarjung's position shifted after receiving reinforcements from Suraj Mal, the Jat ruler, and Salabat Khan. Gaining confidence, Safdarjung encouraged the Jats to loot Old Delhi. On 9 May 1753, the Jats plundered the city, burning several areas. Many civilians fled to the fortified New Delhi, while the Jats extracted lakhs of rupees from the city's outskirts.

In response, on 13 May 1753, Ahmad Shah Bahadur dismissed Safdarjung as Wazir (prime minister) and appointed Intizam-ud-Daulah in his place, with Imad-ul-Mulk as Mir Bakshi (chief military officer). Safdarjung retaliated by declaring a eunuch as a rival emperor under the name Akbar Ādilshāh and appointing himself as Wazir and Sarbuland Khan as Mir Bakshi.

== Battle ==
Between 9 May and 4 June 1753, numerous skirmishes took place, largely favoring Safdarjung. However, the arrival of Najib Khan and his Rohilla forces to aid the emperor changed the tide. A significant assault on Delhi's walls on 5 June failed, marking the beginning of Safdarjung's decline. By 7 November, Safdarjung had suffered several defeats and was pushed back to Ballabgarh.

One of the pivotal moments for Safdarjung was the death of his favored general, Rajendra Gossain, from a musket shot. Devastated, Safdarjung refused to enter the battlefield personally, which demoralized his troops. The Jats and Qizilbashes on Safdarjung's side continued to fight against the Marathas and the imperial forces, but the morale of his men weakened, leading to defections to the emperor's camp.

Meanwhile, the emperor received reinforcements from several regional rulers, and the Marathas exploited the situation by attacking Safdarjung's rear, looting his camp. Suraj Mal, recognizing the deteriorating situation, entered negotiations with Intizam-ud-Daulah. Desperate for peace, Ahmad Shah Bahadur sought the assistance of Sawai Madho Singh of Jaipur. Madho Singh successfully mediated a peace treaty between the emperor and Safdarjung. As a reward, the emperor granted Madho Singh the fort and district of Ranthambore.

Safdarjung and the other warlords eventually left the capital. However, the conflict left the emperor financially strained, contributing to his eventual dethronement six months later.

== Aftermath ==
The rebellion had severe financial consequences for the Mughal Empire. The emperor's army and its allies, numbering around 80,000 troops, cost the imperial treasury approximately 24 lakh rupees per month. The prolonged conflict, which lasted seven months, left the emperor indebted by 1 crore and 68 lakhs. Additionally, the imperial forces had not been paid for two years, and the emperor was only able to raise two lakhs by selling his personal jewelry.

Following the rebellion, Imad-ul-Mulk, the de facto ruler of Delhi, sought assistance from the Marathas and orchestrated an attack on Jat territory. In January 1754, the Marathas, led by Raghunath Rao, alongside Mughal forces, laid siege to the Kumher Fort, ruled by Suraj Mal. Despite a strong resistance from Suraj Mal, the Marathas failed to capture the fort and eventually accepted 30 lakh rupees as compensation. Furthermore, Imad-ul-Mulk and Raghunath Rao extorted an additional two crores from Suraj Mal, which they had promised to deliver to the emperor as Peshkash (tribute).

== See also ==
- Battle of Kumher (1754)
- Battle of Delhi (1764)
