= Ghazi ud-Din Khan Feroze Jung =

Ghazi ud-Din Khan Feroze Jung may refer to:

- Ghazi ud-Din Khan Feroze Jung I - (1649-1710 CE)
- Ghazi ud-Din Khan Feroze Jung II - (?-1752 CE)
- Ghazi ud-Din Khan Feroze Jung III - (1736-1800 CE)
