= Sayyid Salabat Khan Zulfiqar Jang =

Kashmiri noble of Mughals

Sayyid Salabat Khan Zulfiqar Jang was a Mughal noble of Kashmiri descent and the Mir Bakhshi and Amir-ul-Umara of Ahmad Shah Bahadur.

== Background ==
Originally named Sayyid Hussain Khan, he was born as the son of Saadat Khan, Mir Muhammad Taqi Hussaini. Salabat Khan was the brother-in-law of the Mughal emperor Farrukhsiyar. They were ethnic Kashmiris belonging to the Marashi clan. His father Saadat Khan was appointed governor of Kashmir on the accession of Farrukhsiyar in place of Inayatullah Khan Kashmiri, and was the late Mir-i-Atish, or general of the artillery. Although they attempted to support the Mughal Emperor Farrukhsiyar, Salabat Khan's father was killed in a battle against the Barah Sayyids, while Salabat Khan escaped alive. The later Mughal emperor used to refer to him as Nana Baba.

== Biography ==
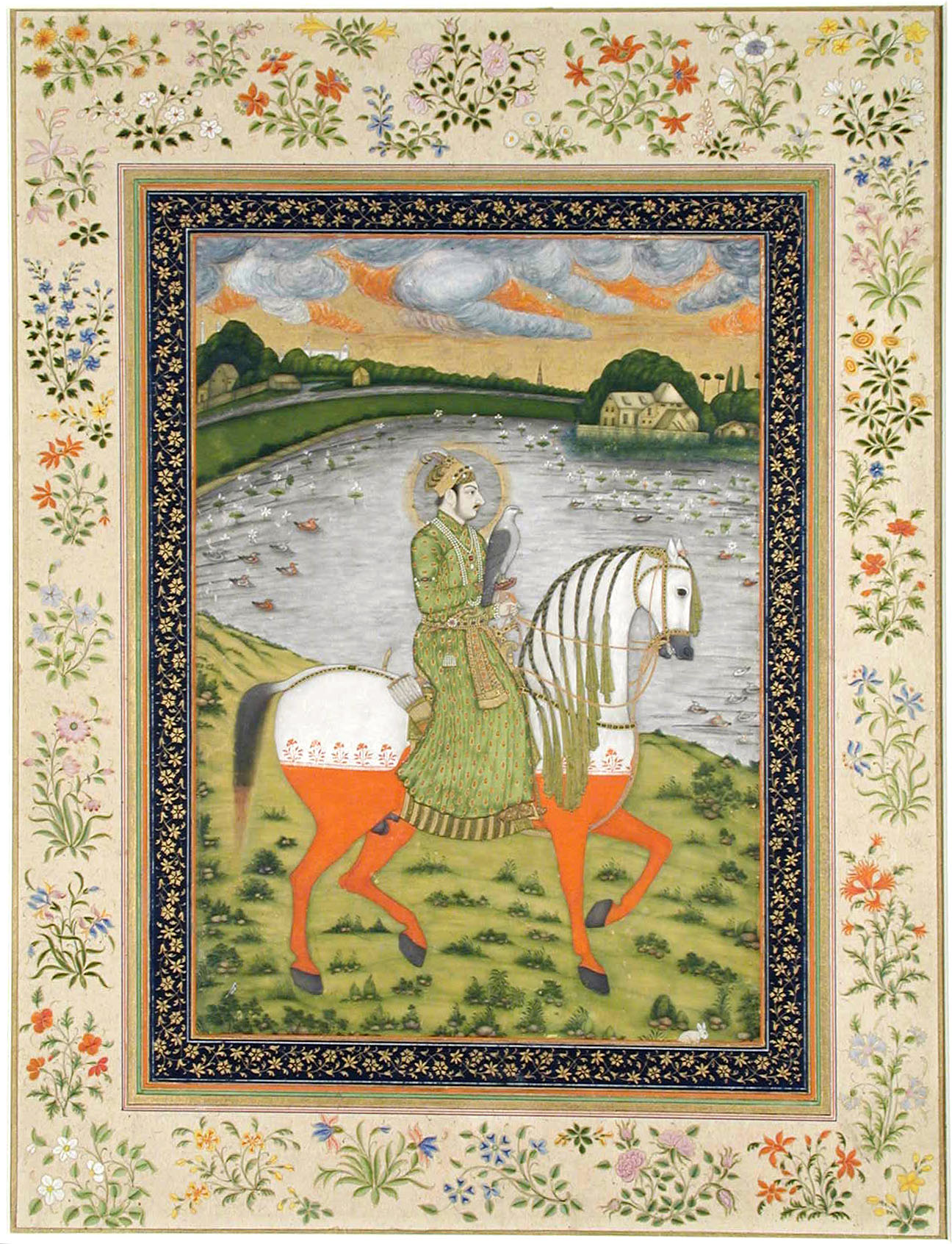
The Emperor Ahmad Shah Bahadur

On the death of Asaf Jah in 1748, Salabat Khan was made the Mir Bakhshi in 29 June. He gained the governorship of Ajmer and Agra, with the Faujdari of Narnaul. In 1740-1750 Salabat Khan ravaged Mewat and captured the fort of Neemrana. The Jats clashed with the Mughal army at Saraj Sobhachand, inflicting losses on it. In April 1750 he came out to invade Rajputana with an army of 18,000 in order to support Bakht Singh against Ishwari Singh. But as neither side desired war, after little fighting the Mughal army left after Ishwari Singh promised a small tribute. This unsuccessful campaign was the last attempt of the dying empire to assert its authority over Rajputana.

In June 1751, Salabat khan insulted the emperor and his favourite Javid Khan, the eunuch. This was reported by Javid Khan to the emperor, resulting in Salabat Khan's dismissal from the post of Mir Bakhshi and Amir-ul-Umara. Salabat Khan sold everything he had and lived in seclusion as a Dervish.

After the disbandment of the Indian Muslim cavalry regiment known as the Sin-Dagh, Imad-ul-Mulk attempted to call to his aide Salabat Khan, the ex-Bakhshi of the last emperor, who had been living in retirement and disgrace at Agra. But this last great noble of Farrukhsiyar and Muhammad Shah was now an aged phantom only, and he sunk into his grave on 6 June 1757.

== Family ==
His son Ahmad Ali Khan was the Bakhshi of the Ahadis.
