= Grand vizier =

Title of heads of government in the Islamic world

Grand vizier (Arabic: الوزير الأعظم, romanized: al-Wazir al-a'zam; Persian and Ottoman Turkish: صدر اعظم, romanized: sadr-ı aʾzam; Turkish: sadrazam) was the title of the effective head of government of many sovereign states in the Islamic world. It was first held by officials in the later Abbasid Caliphate. It was then held in the Ottoman Empire, the Mughal Empire, the Sokoto Caliphate, the Safavid Empire and Cherifian Empire of Morocco. In the Ottoman Empire, the grand vizier held the imperial seal and could convene all other viziers to attend to affairs of the state; the viziers in conference were called "Kubbealtı viziers" in reference to their meeting place, the Kubbealtı ('under the dome') in Topkapı Palace. His offices were located at the Sublime Porte. The Prime Minister of Pakistan is referred to in Urdu as Wazir-e-azam, which translates literally to grand vizier.

Initially, the grand viziers were exclusively of Turk origin in the Ottoman Empire. However, after there were troubles between the Turkish grand vizier Çandarlı Halil Pasha the Younger and Sultan Mehmed II (who had him executed), there was a rise of slave administrators (devshirme). These were much easier for the sultans to control, as compared to the free administrators of Turkish aristocratic origin.

== Etymology ==
The term Grand Vizier is the English translation of the Ottoman Turkish titles Vezir-i Azam (وزير اعظم) or Sadrazam (صدر اعظم), both from Classical Persian.

Linguistically, the core components of these titles are derived from the Arabic language. The word Vizier originates from the Arabic wazīr (وزير), which is derived from the Semitic triliteral root W-Z-R (و ز ر), meaning "to bear a burden," "to carry," or "to support." This reflects the historical administrative role of the official in carrying the burdens of the state on behalf of the sovereign. Another theory for the etymology of the word is derivation from Middle Persian (see Vizier).

The component Azam (أعظم, aʿẓam) translates to "supreme," "great," or "greatest." The term Sadr (صدر, ṣadr) literally translates to "chest," but is used in political and administrative contexts to denote the "forefront," "head," or "chief."

The i between the components is the ezafeh.

The rank and institution of the wazir were formally established as a state office during the Abbasid Caliphate. The specific compound titles Vezir-i Azam and Sadrazam were later institutionalized to designate the highest absolute deputyship within the Ottoman Empire.

== Examples ==
=== Ottoman Empire ===
Coat of arms of the Grand Vizier in Ottoman Empire

The term vizier was originally used in the Abbasid Caliphate in the 8th century AD. This position was later adopted by the Ottomans in the early 14th century, by the Seljuks of Anatolia. During the nascent phases of the Ottoman state, "vizier" was the only title used. The first of these Ottoman viziers who was titled "Grand Vizier" (French spelling: grand-vézir (Note: In languages of ethnic minorities: Armenian: Mec epark‘osi; Bulgarian: Велик везир Velikyi vezyr; Greek: Μεγάλου Βεζύρου (Megalou Vezyrou); Ladino: gran vizir)) was Çandarlı Halil Pasha the Elder. The purpose in instituting the title "Grand Vizier" was to distinguish the holder of the sultan's seal from other viziers. The initially more frequently used title of vezir-ı a’zam (وزیر اعظم) was gradually replaced by another one, sadr-ı a’zam (صدر اعظم from Arabic صَدْر "front part, bosom, forehead, lead, forefront" and أعْظَم "superior, major, maximal, paramount, grand", informally pronounced sadrazam), both meaning "grand vizier" in practice.

Halil Pasha the Elder reformed the role of the vizier in several ways. Several viziers before him held an equivalent, but differently named office; he was the first who held the position of "Grand Vizier", during the reign of Murad I. He was the first advisor with a military background – his forerunners had come from a more scholarly class of men. It is also significant that he was the first of a political family that, at the time, rivaled the Ottoman dynasty itself. Several of Çandarlı Halil Pasha the Elder's kin went on to hold the office of Grand Vizier in the decades following his death.

Çandarlı Halil Pasha the Younger, the grandson of Pasha the Elder, was also highly influential in shaping the role of the Grand Vizier. During the reign of Mehmed II, the Younger opposed the siege of Constantinople and the ongoing hostilities with Christians. Two days after the siege was won by Mehmed II, the Younger was executed for his opposition. After his death, the position of Grand Vizier was chosen nearly exclusively from the kul system. Often, the men who were chosen had a Byzantine or Balkan background. According to Gábor, this was usually a political move, designed to appease powerful European factions to Ottoman supremacy. In fact, it was easier for the sultan to control an enslaved and non-Turk administrator. In the Ottoman Empire, executing a Grand Vizier of Turkish origin (in the event they were rebellious) and an enslaved foreigner would also give rise to different reactions. Further, the devshirme were less subject to influence from court factions. From the very beginning, the Turcoman were a danger that undermined the Sultan's creation of a strong state.

Grand Viziers gained immense political supremacy in the later days of the Ottoman Empire. Power was centralized in the position of the Grand Vizier during the Köprülü era. Köprülü Mehmed Pasha was a powerful political figure during the reign of Mehmed IV, and was appointed to the office of Grand Vizier in 1656. He consolidated power within the position and sent the Sultan away from the city on hunting trips, thus stopping Mehmed's direct management over the state. Next, he forcibly removed any officers suspected of corruption; those who did not leave were executed. He also conducted campaigns against Venice and the Habsburgs, as well as quelling rebellions in Anatolia. On his deathbed five years later, he convinced Mehmed to appoint his son (Köprülü Fazıl Ahmed Pasha) as the next Grand Vizier, thus securing his dynasty a position of supreme power in the Empire. It was during the Köprülü era that the Ottoman Empire reached its largest geographic expansion across Europe, Asia Minor, and Africa.

In Ottoman legal theory, the Sultan was supposed to conduct affairs of state exclusively via the Grand Vizier, but in reality, this arrangement was often circumvented. As the Ottomanist Colin Imber writes, the sultan "had closer contact with the pages of the privy chamber, the kapi agha, the kizlar agha or with other courtiers than he did with the Grand Vizier, and these too could petition the sultan on their own or somebody else’s behalf. He might, too, be more inclined to take the advice of his mother, a concubine, or the head gardener at the helm of the royal barge, than of the Grand Vizier".

After the Tanzimat period of the Ottoman Empire in the 19th century, the Grand Viziers came to assume a role more like that of the prime ministers of contemporary Western monarchies.

Forty nine Grand Viziers of Albanian ethnicity served the empire during the Ottoman period and most of them were southern Albanians (Tosks).

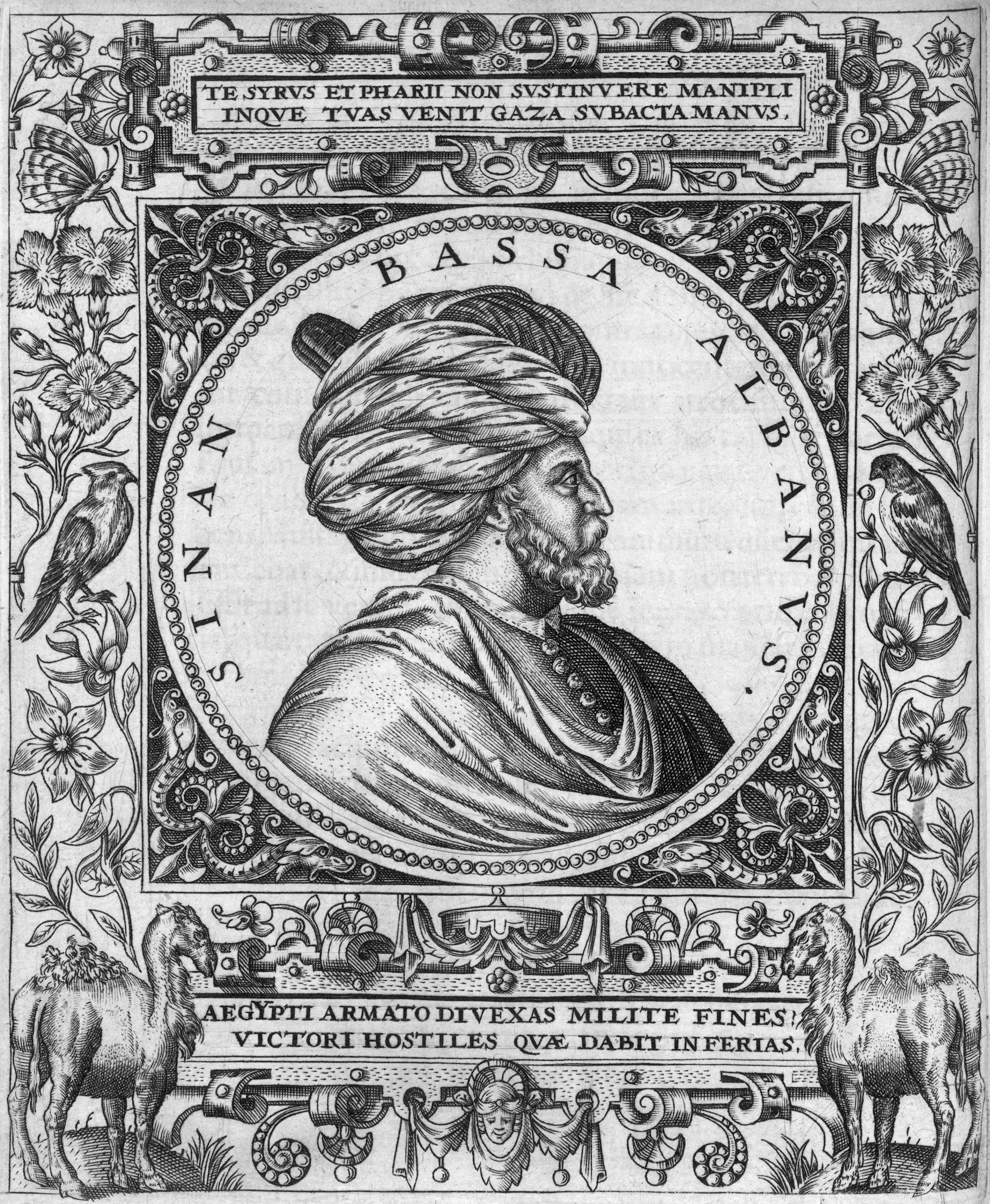
Koca Sinan Pasha

=== Mughal Empire ===
Bairam Khan was the Grand Vizier of the Mughal Empire, who led the forces of Akbar to victory during the Second Battle of Panipat.

Abu'l-Fazl ibn Mubarak, also later served as Grand Vizier during the reign of Akbar.

Saadullah Khan, Grand Vizier of the Mughal Empire during the reign of Shah Jahan, made a significant contribution to the organization and administration of the Mughal Empire and is among the best regarded of the line of Mughal Grand Viziers.

During the reign of Aurangzeb, Ali Quli Khan was bestowed this title.

Later general Zulfiqar Khan Nusrat Jung became Grand Vizier, his fame as one of the most greatest military leaders in the Mughal Empire would lead to his downfall when rogue generals executed him in a power struggle after the death of Aurangzeb.

In 1718, Balaji Vishwanath, leader of the antagonistic Maratha Confederacy, secured the right to collect Chauth and Sardeshmukhi from the Subahs of the Mughal Empire by the rogue Vizier Syed Hassan Ali Khan Barha, whose grip over the Deccan had substantially weakened. Asaf Jah I, however, refused to grant Chauth to the Maratha Confederacy during its onset in 1718 and in 1721, after the nobility of the Mughal Empire had the two Sayyid Brothers assassinated. However, the Marathas had already expanded up to the Narmada River, and entrenched themselves in that region thereafter. Baji Rao I later instigated war by collecting Chauth in 1723, and trying to expand Maratha rule in the Deccan and beyond, causing the outbreak of the later Mughal-Maratha Wars.

Qamaruddin Khan was handpicked to be the Grand Vizier of the Mughal Empire, by Asaf Jah I. He successfully repelled Baji Rao I during the Battle of Delhi (1737), and negotiated peace after the occupation of the Mughal Empire by the forces of Nader Shah. He fell in battle after being struck by a stray artillery shell, in battle against Afghan forces in the year 1748.

After defeating Ahmad Shah Durrani, the new Mughal emperor, Ahmad Shah Bahadur, posted Safdarjung, Nawab of Oudh as Mughal Grand Vizier, Feroze Jung III as Mir Bakshi and Muin ul-Mulk (Mir Mannu), the son of late Grand Vizier Qamaruddin Khan, as the governor of Punjab.

Safdarjung's efforts to defend the reign of Ahmad Shah Bahadur from treacherous subjects failed.

Shuja-ud-Daula served as the leading Grand Vizier of the Mughal Empire during the Third Battle of Panipat. He was also the Nawab of Awadh, and a loyal ally of Shah Alam II.

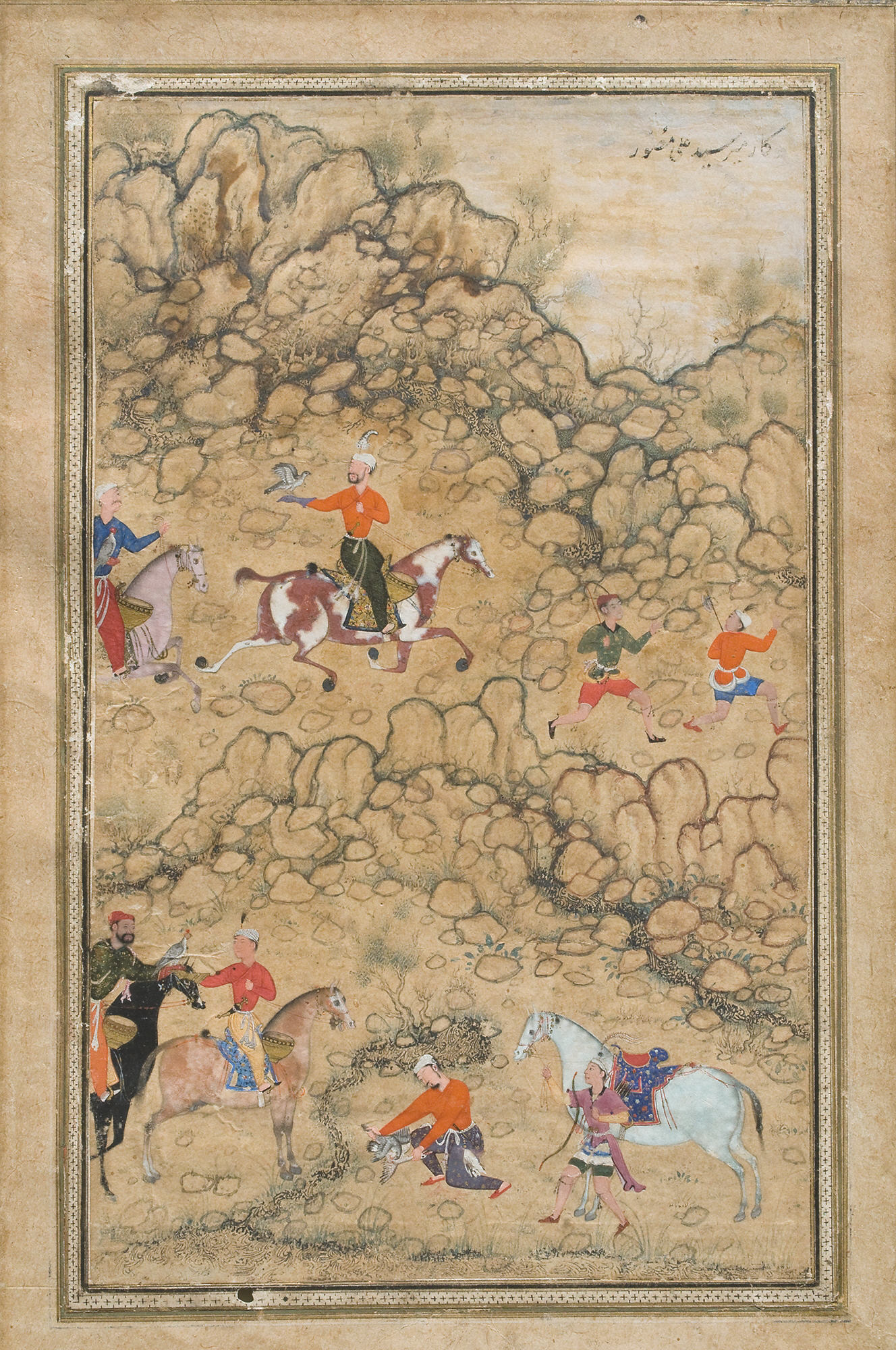
Bairam Khan

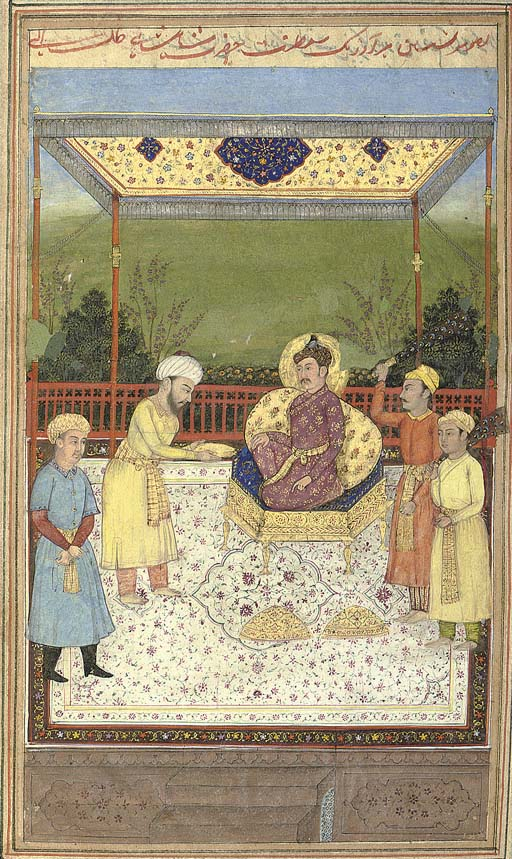
Abu'l Fazl Ibn Mubarak presenting the Akbarnama to the emperor (D. 1602 AD)

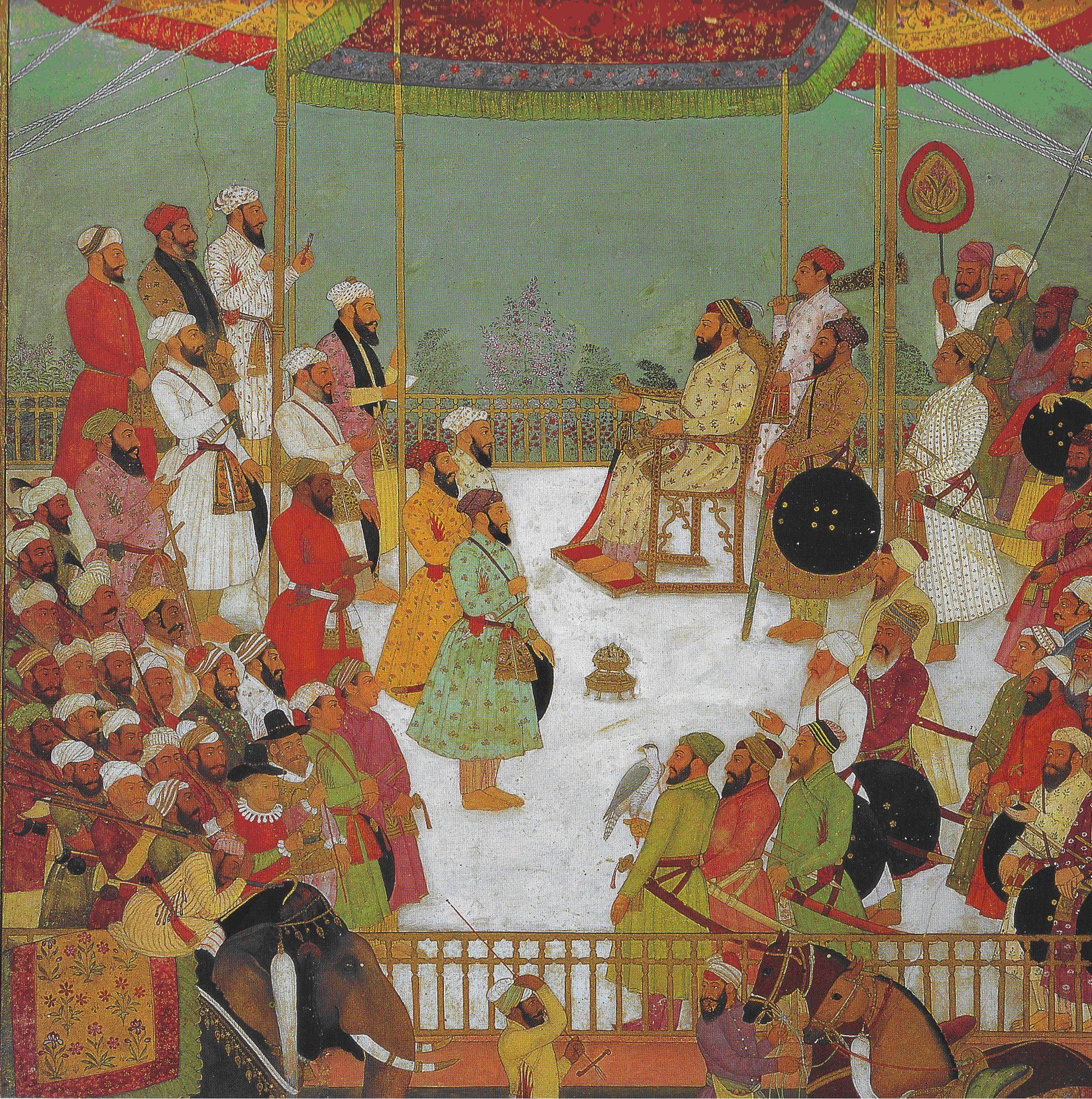
Sadullah Khan

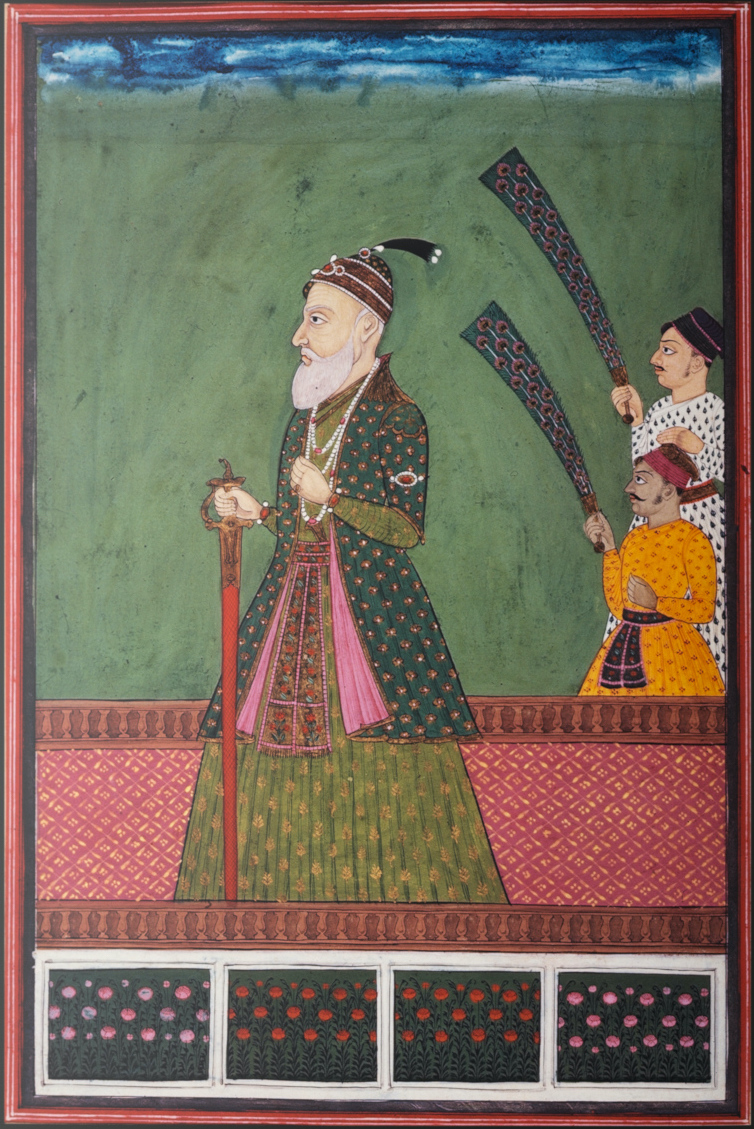
Qamar-ud-din Khan, Asif Jah I became viceroy of the Deccan in 1722 (after resigning as Grand Vizier).

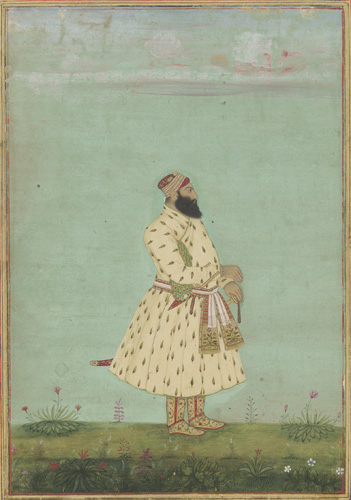
Safdarjung

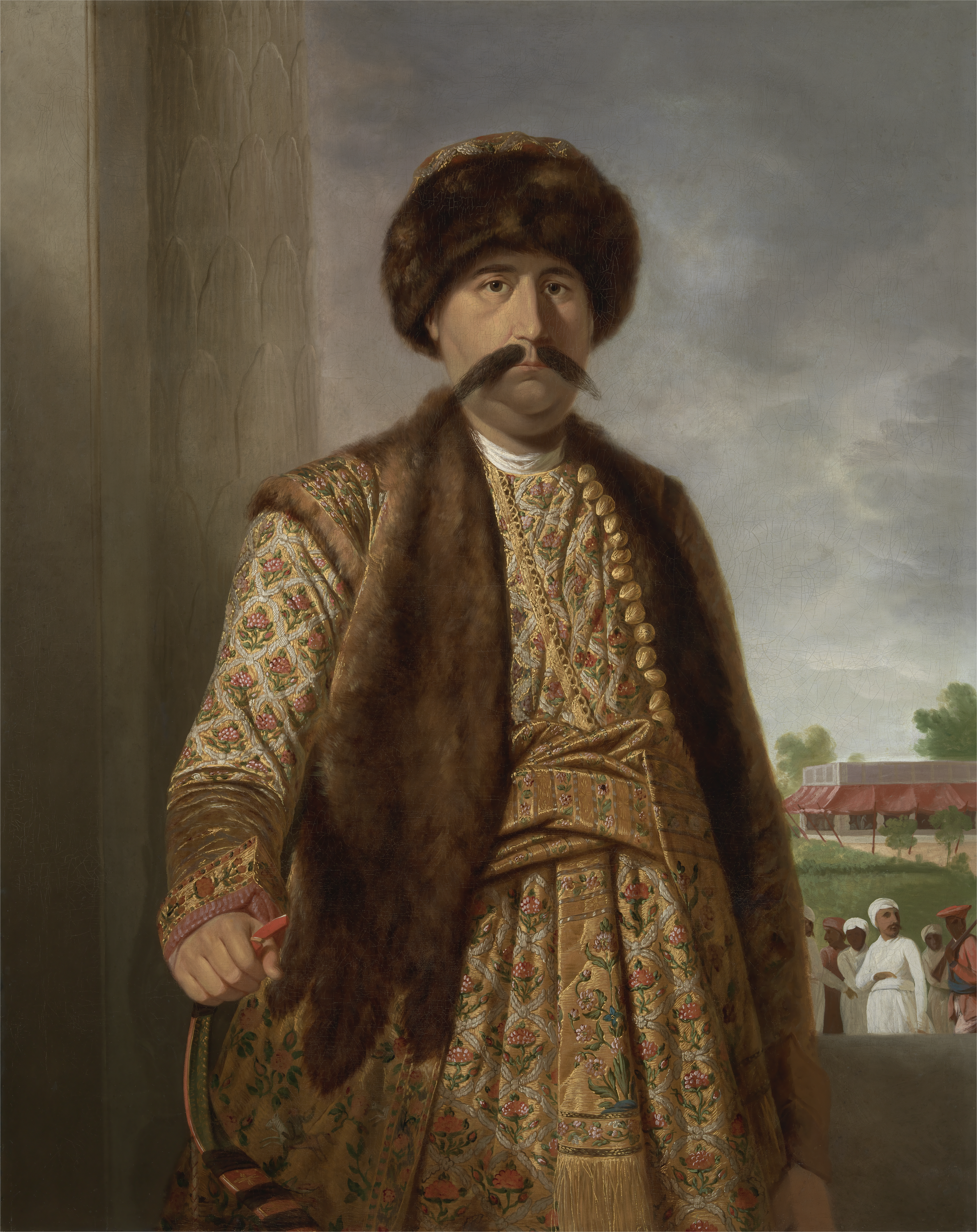
Shuja-ud-Daula

=== Iran ===
In Qajar Iran the chief minister of the Shah came to be styled sadr-e aʿzam. Willem Floor writes that the title was conferred for the first time in 1809, on Mirza Shafi Mazandarani, the chief minister of Fath-Ali Shah, and that it was adopted "following the rule (qanun) of the Ottoman empire". The Cambridge History of Iran likewise notes that the earliest Qajar chief ministers bore the Safavid-era title eʿtemad al-dawla rather than sadr-e aʿzam. Abbas Amanat dates the office slightly earlier, describing Agha Mohammad Khan's appointment of Hajji Ebrahim as sadr-e aʿzam as the first occasion in recent memory on which such a rank had been recognised in the Iranian divan.

The word sadr had a separate and older career in Iran, where from about 1380 until the end of the 18th century it denoted the head of the state religious establishment. That office was abolished early in the Qajar period and is not the ancestor of the Qajar premiership.

A cabinet organised in October 1872 gave the post its fullest formal definition. Writing in the Encyclopædia Iranica, Guity Nashat records that the shah appointed and dismissed the sadr-e aʿzam, who in turn appointed and dismissed the other ministers subject to the shah's approval, could intervene in the internal affairs of any ministry, and served as the sole channel of communication with the sovereign. How much of that authority a given holder actually exercised depended on his standing at court. Mirza Aqa Khan Nuri was styled "irremovable" chief minister (sadr-e aʿzam-e bila-ʿazl) by royal decree, which, as Amanat puts it, meant if it meant anything that the shah himself could not dismiss him. His fall nonetheless closed the line of powerful Qajar premiers that had begun with Qaʾem-Maqam Farahani and continued through Aqasi, Amir Kabir and Nuri himself, and opened a period of autocratic rule by the shah. Amir Kabir, described by Hamid Algar as one of the most capable and innovative figures to appear in the whole Qajar period, held the office under Naser al-Din Shah together with the titles amir-e kabir and atabak; Amin al-Soltan held it under the last three Qajar monarchs.

Neither the Constitution of 1906 nor its Supplementary Fundamental Law of 1907 abolished the post in so many words. The 1906 text mentions the sadr-e aʿzam once, in Article 33, while the Supplement names no head of government at all and deals with ministers collectively. The title raʾis al-wozara, which later became the usual one, was not a creation of the constitutional period either: Mirza Yusof Mostawfi al-Mamalek held it officially in 1882, ranking below the sadr-e aʿzam. The last holder of the senior title was Mirza Nasrollah Khan Moshir al-Dawla, who took office in August 1906 and was obliged to resign in March 1907; Amin al-Soltan, appointed head of the new government in May 1907, is described by historians as prime minister rather than sadr-e aʿzam.

English-language scholarship on Qajar Iran generally renders sadr-e aʿzam as "chief minister", "prime minister" or "premier" rather than "grand vizier", and Amanat states explicitly that he prefers the former translations for the office.

== Notable fictional grand viziers ==
- Ahoshta Tarkaan (The Horse and His Boy)
- Iznogoud (comic series)
- Zigzag (The Thief and the Cobbler)
- Jafar (Aladdin)
- Mas Amedda (Star Wars)
- Zurvan (Prince of Persia: The Sands of Time/The Two Thrones)
- Vizier Alemshah (Kuruluş: Osman)
- Barbudo Grande, and later Titus A. Cromwell (Grand Vizier(s) of the Imperial Corsairs Elite Dangerous)

== See also ==
- List of grand viziers of Persia
- List of Mughal grand viziers
- List of Ottoman grand viziers
- List of Safavid grand viziers
- Sokoto Grand Vizier
- Wuzurg framadar

== Sources ==
- Imber, Colin (2002). The Ottoman Empire, 1300–1650: The Structure of Power. Palgrave Macmillan. ISBN 0-333-61387-2.
