= Javed Khan Nawab Bahadur =

Irani daroga

Javed Khan (c. 1695 – 1752) was an Irani daroga (head of police) under the emperor Muhammad Shah (1719–1748), and as effective regent during the reign of his successor Ahmad Shah Bahadur (1748-1752), during the decline of the Mughal empire.

In 1722, Javed Khan was described as a "handsome eunuch of youthful age and robust personality" as he was made chief eunuch of the royal household. Upon the accession of Ahmad Shah Bahadur in 1748, Javed Khan was conferred the title of Nawab Bahadur by the Emperor, on the insistence of his mother, Udham Bai. Due to the weak leadership of the emperor, he acted as effectively as regent and took the leadership of the so-called "court party", pitted against Nawab Wazir, Safdar Jung.

He was the paramour of Udham Bai, mother of Ahmad shah.

In 1752, he was killed by Safdar Jang, which resulted in his falling out of favour with Udham Bai, and consequently the latter's attempts to reassert control resulted in a full blown civil war between the Irani and Turani parties of the Empire.
