= Alamgir II =

Mughal emperor from 1754 to 1759

Alamgir II عالمگیر دوم
- Padishah; Al-Sultan Al-Azam
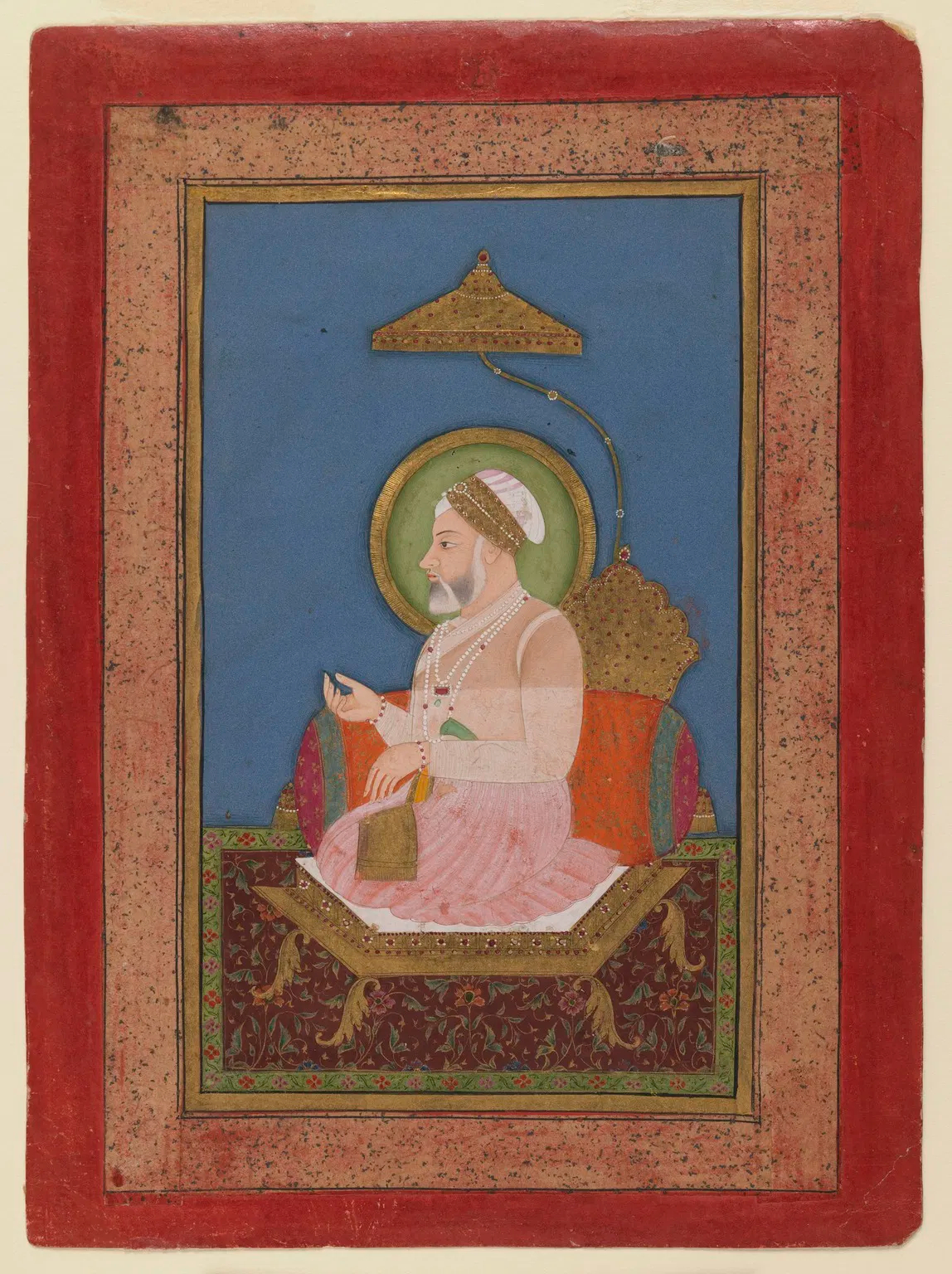
- Portrait by Sukha Luhar, c. 1756

Mughal emperor
- Reign: 3 June 1754 – 29 November 1759
- Predecessor: Ahmad Shah
- Successor: Shah Jahan III
- Regent: Imad-ul-Mulk (1754–1756)
- Mir Bakhshi: Najib-ud-Daulah (1756–1759)
- Born: Mirza Aziz-ud-Din; 6 June 1699; Burhanpur, Mughal Empire
- Died: 29 November 1759 (aged 60); Kotla Fateh Shah, Maratha Empire
- Burial: Humayun's Tomb, Delhi, India
- Spouses: Zinat Mahal; Zinat Afruz Begum (m. 1758)
- Issue: Shah Alam II; Gauhar-un-Nissa Begum; Khair-un-Nissa Begum; Daulat-un-Nissa Begum
Names
- Mirza Aziz-ud-Din Alamgir II
Regnal name
- Alamgir II
- House: Mughal dynasty
- Dynasty: Timurid dynasty
- Father: Jahandar Shah
- Mother: Anup Bai
- Religion: Sunni Islam (Hanafi)

Mirza Aziz-ud-Din Muhammad (Persian: عزیزالدین محمد; 6 June 1699 – 29 November 1759), better known by his regnal name Alamgir II (Persian: عالمگیر دوم), was the fifteenth Mughal emperor from 1754 to 1759. He was the son of Jahandar Shah.

Born Mirza Aziz-ud-Din, the second son of Jahandar Shah, was raised to the throne by Imad-ul-Mulk after he deposed Ahmad Shah Bahadur in 1754. On ascending the throne, he took the title of Alamgir and tried to follow the approach of Aurangzeb (Alamgir I). At the time of his accession to the throne he was 55 years old. He had no experience in administration or warfare as he had spent most of his life in jail. He was a weak ruler, with all the power resting in the hands of his vizier, Imad-ul-Mulk.

In 1756, Ahmad Shah Durrani invaded India once again and captured Delhi and plundered Mathura. While the Marathas became more powerful because of their collaboration with Imad-ul-Mulk, and dominated the whole of northern India. This was the peak of the Maratha expansion, which caused great trouble for the Mughal Empire, already weak with no strong ruler. Relations between Alamgir II and his usurping vizier, Imad-ul-Mulk had now deteriorated, their troubled relation would culminate in the murder of Alamgir by Imad-ul-Mulk. Alamgir II's son Ali Gauhar escaped persecution from Delhi, while Shah Jahan III was placed on the throne.

== Early life ==
Alamgir II was born Aziz-ud-Din on 6 June 1699 at Burhanpur and was the second son of Muizz-ud-Din, himself the son of the future emperor Bahadur Shah I. His mother was a Rajput princess, Anup Bai, with little clarity about her existence.

Aziz-ud-Din was seven when his great-grandfather Aurangzeb died in the Deccan. After the death of his grandfather Bahadur Shah I and the war of succession that followed, his father Jahandar Shah was defeated by the next Mughal Emperor, Farrukhsiyar.

Aziz-ud-Din was then imprisoned in 1714 by Asaf Jah I under Farrukhsiyar. From 1714 to 1754 he was in captivity. After the death of Ahmad Shah Bahadur, he was released in 1754 by the usurping Vizier Ghazi ud-Din Khan Feroze Jung III. He perceived Aziz-ud-Din as a frail personality who would not object to his regime. Therefore, on 2 June 1754, Aziz-ud-Din was given the title Alamgir II by the vizier out of his own recommendation, as he wanted to follow the centralized approach of Aurangzeb.

== Succession to throne ==
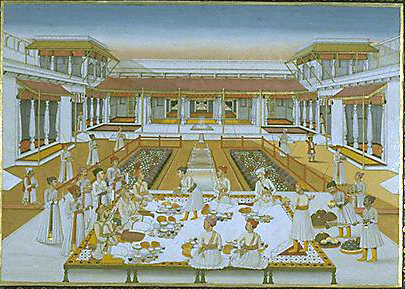
Imad-ul-Mulk, a persecutor of the Mughal imperial family, holds a banquet.

Imad-ul-Mulk hired Maratha mercenaries to do his bidding and put all the imperial revenues into his own pocket and starved Alamgir II's family. He also persecuted Ali Gauhar, the elder son of Alamgir II.

Since then, relations between Alamgir II and Imad-ul-Mulk's regime were so bad that the latter got him assassinated in November 1759.

== Reign ==
After the emergence of Alamgir II the Mughal Empire had impulsively began to re-centralize, particularly when many Nawabs sought the gratification of the Mughal Emperor and his co-ordination regarding their resistance to the Maratha. This development was clearly unwelcome by Imad-ul-Mulk who sought to strengthen his authoritarianism with the undaunted support of the Marathas. His Amir-ul-Umara and Mir Bakhshi continued to be Mirza Ashraf, the son of Khan Dowran VII (a noble in the reign of Farrukhsiyar and Muhammad Shah).

=== Alliance with the Durrani Empire ===
In the year 1755, the acclaimed Mughal viceroy of Punjab, Moin-ul-Mulk died, his widow Mughlani Begum desperately sought the assistance of Ahmad Shah Durrani to halt any succession struggle and to quell the Sikh rebels in the eastern regions.

Ahmad Shah Durrani and his forces then marched into Lahore in the year 1756 and appointed his son Timur Shah Durrani as the new viceroy at Lahore, under the protection of the commander Jahan Khan and also placed Adina Beg as the Faujdar of Doab. Ahmad Shah Durrani then plundered Sikh and Hindu inhabitants in the unstable and outlawed eastern regions of the Punjab.

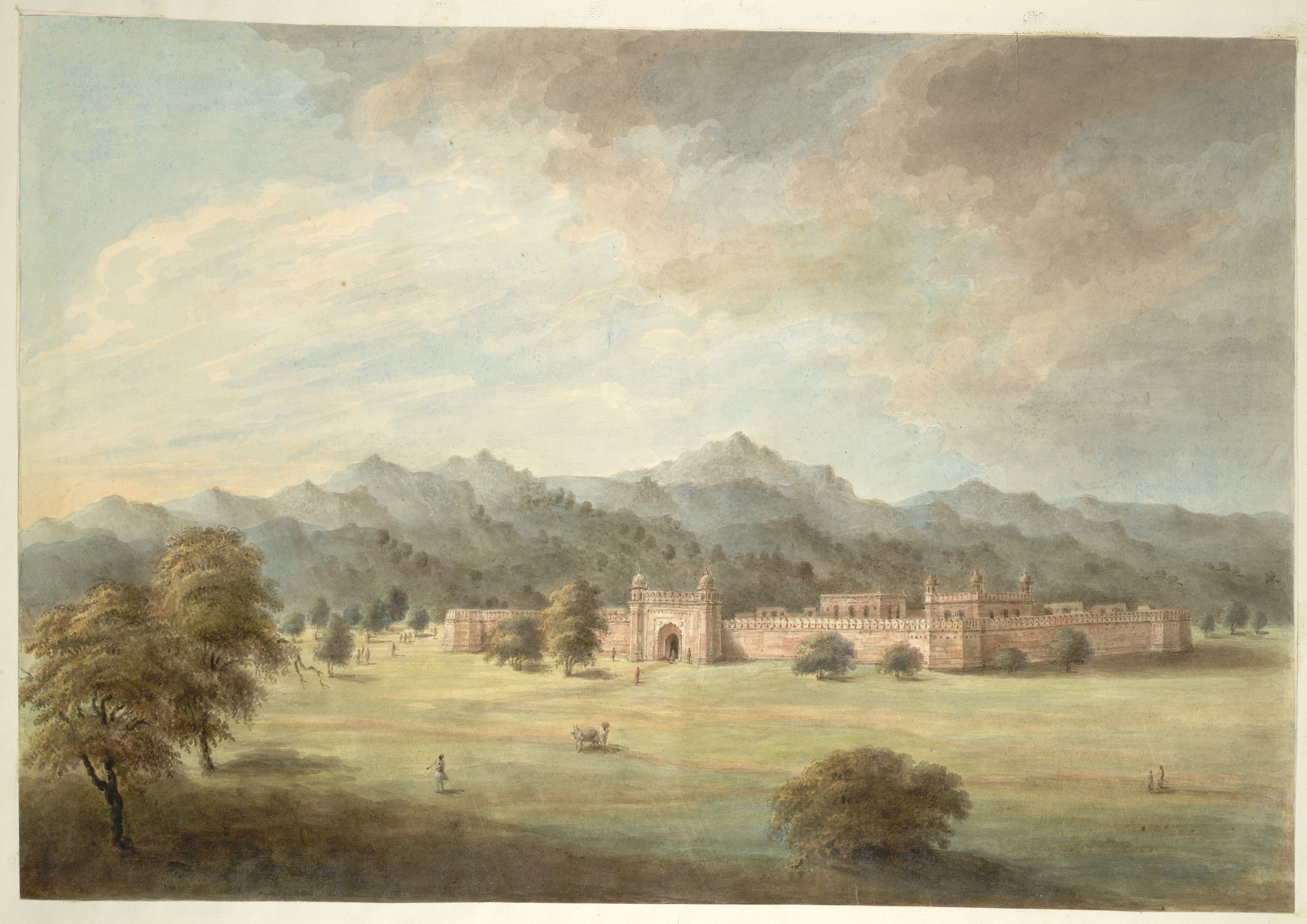
Patthargarh fort (literally meaning: "stone stronghold") outside Najibabad, built by Najib ad-Dawlah in 1755, during the reign of the Mughal Emperor Alamgir II.

He then marched towards Delhi, in January 1757, the Mughal Emperor Alamgir II with courtiers such as Shah Waliullah, nobles such as Najib-ul-Daula, and the imperial family went to meet Ahmad Shah Durrani, whose forces then engaged the Marathas in combat and threatened to overthrow and execute the regime of Imad-ul-Mulk in the sacking of Delhi.

Ahmad Shah Durrani's relations with the Mughal Emperor, strengthened further when his son Timur Shah Durrani was chosen as the suitor of Alamgir II's daughter Zuhra Begum. Ahmad Shah Durrani himself also married Hadrat Begum the daughter of the former Mughal Emperor Muhammad Shah.

Ahmad Shah Durrani returned to Kabul leaving his forces led by his son Timur Shah Durrani consolidating themselves inside the garrisons of Lahore where they founded the Zamzama cannon with the assistance of Mughal metalsmiths.

He was supported by Mohammad Bahawal Khan II (Nawab Amir of Bhawalpur) and Muhammad Nasir Khan I (Khanate of Kalat).

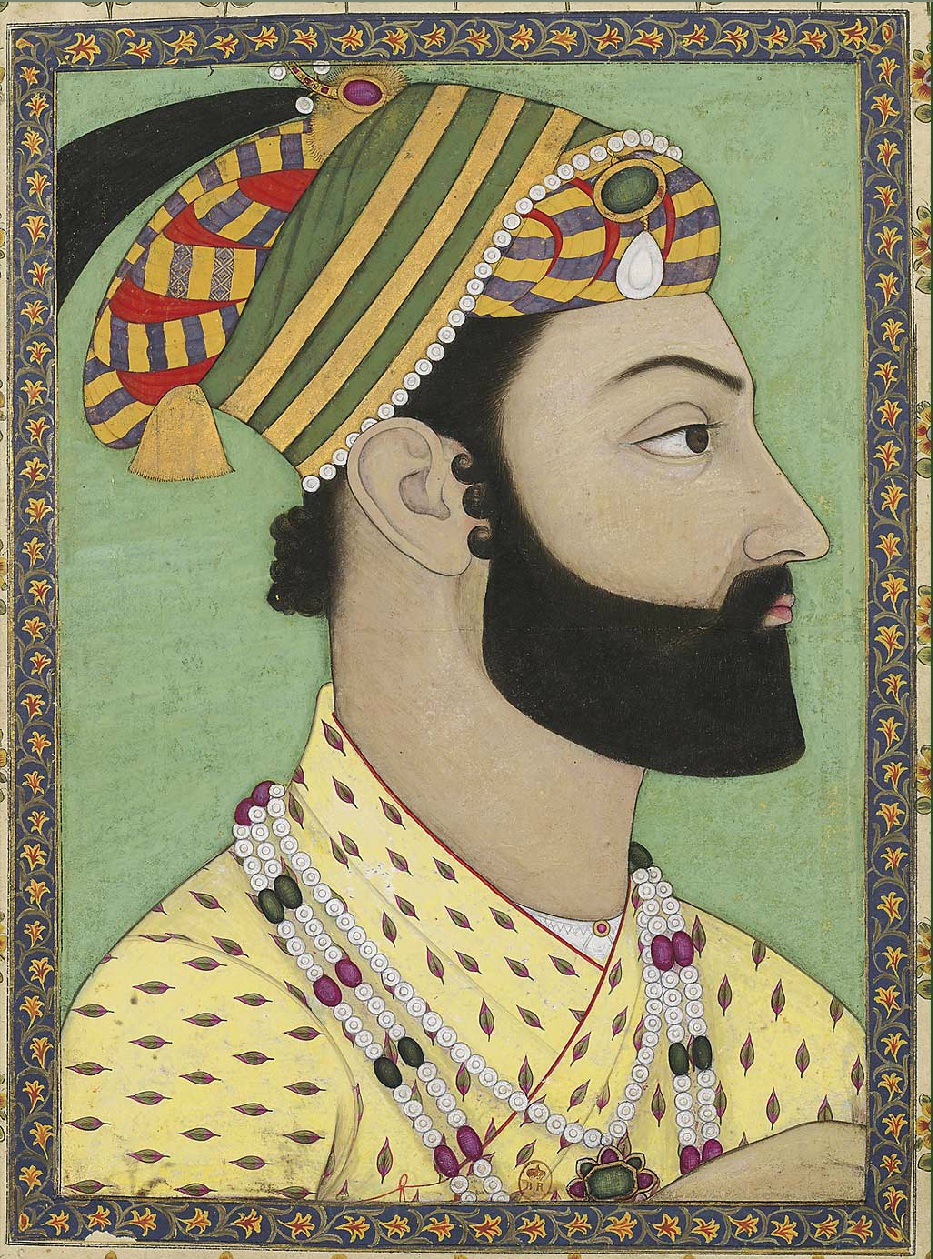
Ahmad Shah Durrani.

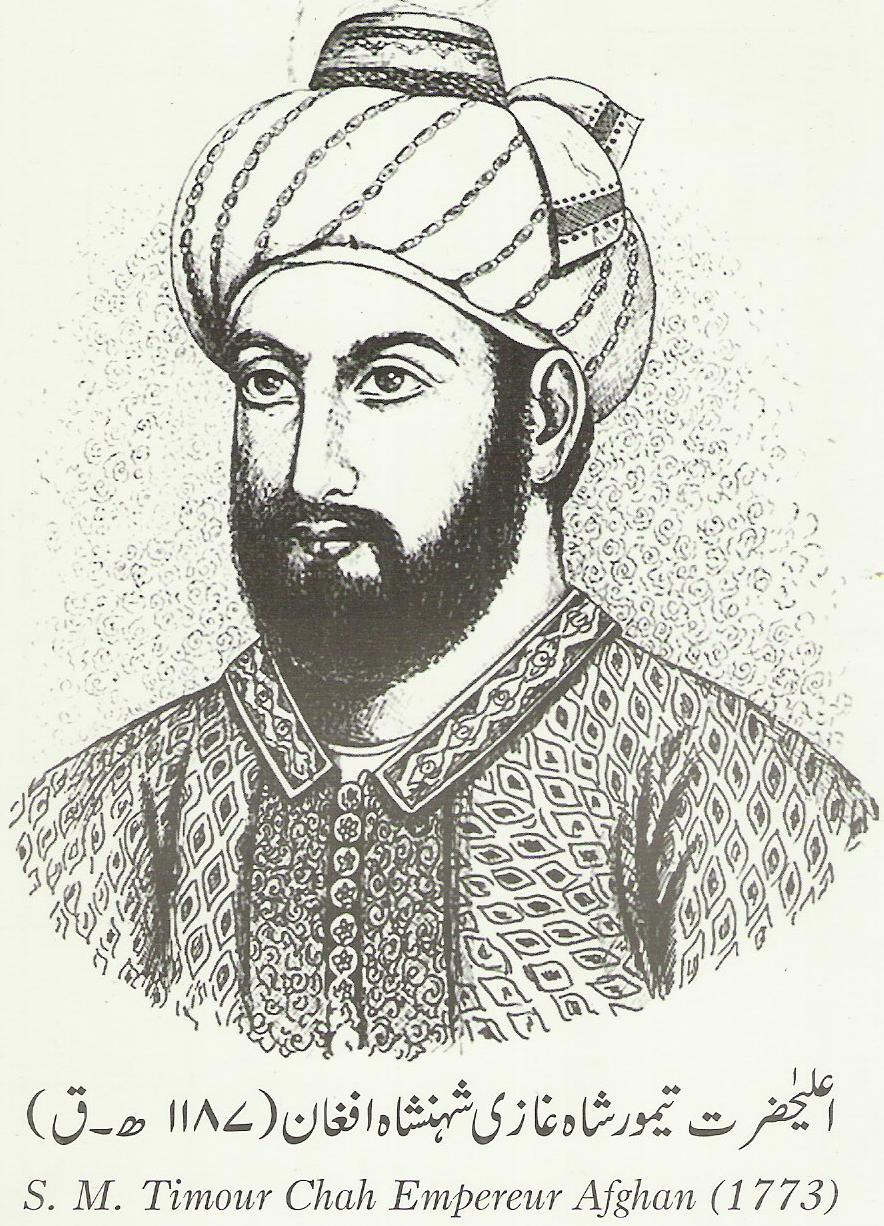
Timur Shah Durrani.

=== Siege of Delhi (1757) ===
In July 1757, the Marathas led by Raghunathrao rejected the alliance established between the Durrani Empire and the Mughal Empire, they were assisted by Imad-ul-Mulk and encamped 30 km opposite to the Red Fort and occupied all the villages by the Jamuna they began to besiege Delhi.

The Marathas fought against Alamgir II's incumbent Mir Bakhshi ("Paymaster") Najib-ul-Daula along with his lieutenants Qutub Shah and Aman Khan and a Mughal Army of 2,500 garrisoned inside the metropolis of Delhi. The angry Maratha set ferries ablaze and stopped food supplies from entering Delhi, while Najib-ul-Daula positioned his heavy artillery outside the vicinity of the Red Fort.

Unable to gain any assistance from Ahmad Shah Durrani, who was engaged in quelling various rebellions near Herat; Najib-ul-Daula surrendered after resisting the combined brigands of Maratha Confederacy for more than five months, he conceded defeat and withdrew to Najibabad. When the Marathas entered Delhi the emperor Alamgir II and his royal family had somehow fled to Bharatpur State. The Marathas looted and plundered the city and the people of Delhi. Mosques and Shrines built by the Mughals were desecrated; and the Peshwa conspired to place Vishwasrao upon the Mughal throne.

Imad-ul-Mulk was reappointed Mir Bakhshi and with the support of the Marathas. Not long after entering Delhi the Marathas encountered a Jat regiment sent by Suraj Mal who now began to claim sovereignty over Delhi. The Jat also plundered Delhi but soon afterwards made it possible for Alamgir II and the Mughal royal family to return to Delhi from Bharatpur.

However, despite losing control of Delhi, Najib-ul-Daula and his associates, such as Qutub Khan and Abdus Samad Khan the Mughal Faujdar of Sirhind, continued to challenge the Maratha Confederacy and its allies during confrontations at Saharanpur and Shahabad Markanda. In response the Marathas sacked the inhabitants of Taraori, Karnal and Kunjpura.

The Maratha attack upon Kunjpura triggered a military response by Ahmad Shah Durrani. Whose forces crossed the sacred rivers of India in search of their Maratha opponents.

=== Subjects opposing the Maratha Confederacy ===
In the year 1756, Alamgir II sympathised with the cause of his loyal Nawabs of Kurnool, Cuddapah and Savanur, when their assigned territories were ravaged and plundered until 1757 by the Maratha chieftain Balaji Baji Rao.

=== Third Carnatic War (1757–1763) ===
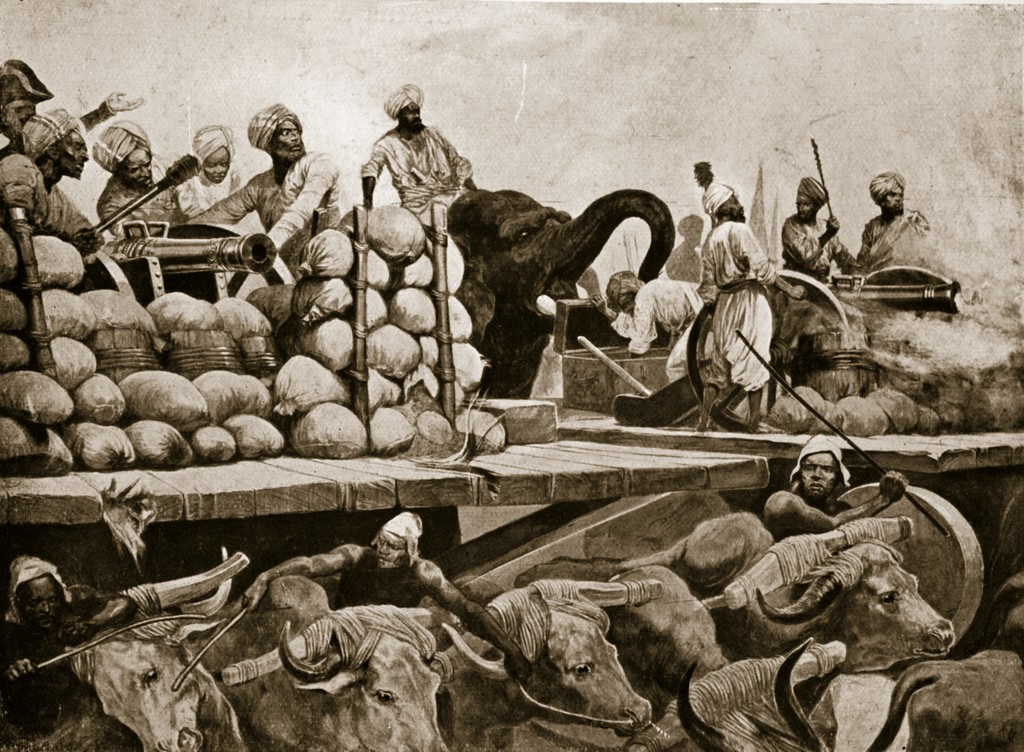
Mughal artillerymen at Plassey during the Carnatic Wars.

==== Loss of Bengal ====
Alamgir II grieved the death of Alivardi Khan the famous Nawab of Bengal, who annually pledged 5 million dams to the imperial court. His successor Siraj-ud-Daula was recognised as the next Nawab of Bengal, but he faced internal rivals who refused to consider the firman granted by Alamgir II to Siraj-ud-Daula. These internal conflicts would lead Siraj-ud-Daula to hastily annex Calcutta from the English East India Company, without the permission of the Mughal Emperor Alamgir II and Salabat Jung. Siraj-ud-Daula was quickly defeated by Clive who recaptured Calcutta and defeated Siraj-ud-Daula during the Battle of Plassey in the year 1757. After the annihilation of his entire army Siraj-ud-Daula fled and was killed by the forces of the treacherous Mir Jafar. The deceased Siraj-ud-Daula's pretensions were criticised in the Mughal imperial court by Ghulam Husain Tabatabai, and Alamgir II refused to recognise Mir Jafar as the next Nawab of Bengal. In response to the imperial court's decision Mir Jafar thus consolidated and allied with the manipulative Imad-ul-Mulk against the imperial family.

==== Authority in the Deccan ====
Throughout Alamgir II's reign French commandant de Bussy and Lally and their allies such as Salabat Jung and Hyder Ali greatly contributed to the advancement of forces in the Deccan opposed to the utter dominance of the Maratha renegades, their achievements had earned them fame throughout the influential circles within the Mughal Empire. In the year 1756, Salabat Jung's forces utilised heavy muskets known as Catyocks, which were attached to the ground, it was known to have fired more rapidly than a cannon. These new weapons would completely reverse fortunes of the Maratha rebels. Soon after the Battle of Plassey, the French commander De Bussy, also entitled Saif-ud-Daula Umdat-ul-Mulk and Mansabdar of 7000, by the Mughal Emperor Alamgir II. He captured the Northern Circars from the British along with his assistant Hyder Jung the "Vakil" (attorney) representing the French within the Mughal Empire and Salabat Jung. However the Northern Circars were retaken by Forde in the year 1758 and De Bussy was recalled to France. Fearing the worst, Salabat Jung reconciled with the English East India Company and recognised their protectorate and was soon overthrown by his own brother Nizam Ali Khan.

=== Raja of Kashmir ===
In 1754, the Durrani governor of Kashmir, Sukh Jiwan Mal, expelled his deputy and asserted independence. To ratify his claim, he asked Alamgir II to recognise him as the sole representative of Kashmir. Alamgir II, in an agreement, conferred the title of Raja upon Sukh Jiwan.

=== Nawab of Punjab ===
Adina Beg, the former Nazim of Doaba, was appointed as the governor of Punjab by Nana Saheb I after his victory over the Durranis. Adina, who rather served as an autonomous ruler, was designated as the Nawab of Punjab by Alamgir II as he bestowed upon him the title of Zafar Jang Bahadur.

=== Nawab of Bhopal ===
In the year 1758, the Mughal Army of Faiz Mohammad Khan the Nawab of Bhopal was treacherously attacked by his step-mother Mamola Bai who suddenly besieged the Mughal garrison at Fortress of Raisen in 1758, according to the layout of the Marathas. The outraged Mughal Emperor Alamgir II, then issued a firman supporting Faiz Mohammad Khan was the Nawab of Bhopal the only chosen administrator of Raisen, the emperor also granted the title Bahadur to Faiz Mohammad Khan the Nawab of Bhopal. However the fort remained under the control of Mamola Bai and the renegade Nanasaheb Peshwa. The fortress of Raisen was quickly retaken by Faiz Mohammad Khan in the year 1760, after the tragic assassination of Alamgir II and after Sadashivrao Bhau threatened to ravage Bhopal prior to the Third Battle of Panipat. It is believed that Faiz Mohammad Khan's Sepoys were among those who had cut off the various supply routes of the Marathas just before the Third Battle of Panipat.

=== Nawab of Cambay ===
Najm-ad-Dawla supported British presence in Cambay. Turning much of his estate into an international "safe zone". Although it is likely that he too had to face threats from the Maratha climax.

=== "Nawab of Mysore" ===
In 1758, Hyder Ali and his Sepoys captured Bangalore from "Khande Rao of the Maratha Confederacy".

In honour of his achievements during the Carnatic Wars, the king gave him the title "Nawab Haider Ali Khan Bahadur".

=== Zenith of the Maratha Confederacy ===
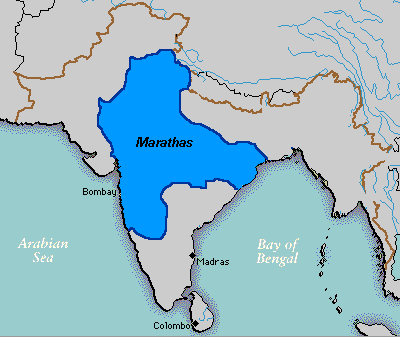
Maratha Confederacy at its zenith in 1760, the Peshwa discussed abolishing the Mughal Empire and placing Vishwasrao on the imperial throne in Delhi.

In 1758 the Marathas led by Raghunathrao occupied Lahore after extracting an extortion of imperial wealth from Imad-ul-Mulk, together they conspired the overthrow of young Timur Shah Durrani. Raghunathrao drove out Jahan Khan and Timur Shah Durrani, the son and viceroy of Ahmad Shah Durrani. Timur Shah Durrani and his forces were forced to retreat from Lahore to Peshawar under the force of attacks from Sikhs and Marathas. This victory made the belligerent Peshwa, grandiosely sack Delhi, and stated his intentions of placing Vishwasrao on the Mughal throne.

=== Assassination ===
Many of his actions had angered the people of India. Fearing a backlash in the summer of the year 1759 Prince Ali Gauhar escaped from Delhi.

Agitated by the daring escape, Imad-ul-Mulk and Sadashivrao Bhau reckoned that Alamgir II was about to advance his son Prince Ali Gauhar, to dispossess and overthrow their regime.

After detailed consideration Imad-ul-Mulk and an angry mob of various ethnic groups plotted to murder the Mughal Emperor Alamgir II and the assassinations of prominent members of his family in the winter of 1759.

==== Aftermath ====
The defeat of Alamgir II's son-in-law, Timur Shah Durrani by the Marathas in the year 1760, provoked the wrath of Ahmad Shah Durrani, who launched a massive campaign gathering more troops than ever before. In response to Imad-ul-Mulk and Sadashivrao Bhau; Najib-ud-Daula and his firm alliance of principal Muslim nobles in the Mughal Empire and Ahmad Shah Abdali recaptured Delhi and placed it under the nominal authority of Shah Alam II. In the south Hyder Ali and his Mysore Army ferociously attacked the Maratha. Meanwhile, Shah Alam II anticipated the collapse of the Maratha and declared Shuja-ud-Daula his Grand Vizier and Najib-ud-Daula as his honorary Mukhtar Khas (Chief Representative). These developments eventually culminated into rise of religious and political loyalties that eventually clashed at the "Third Battle of Panipat" in the year 1761.

== Foreign relations ==
=== Seven Years' War ===
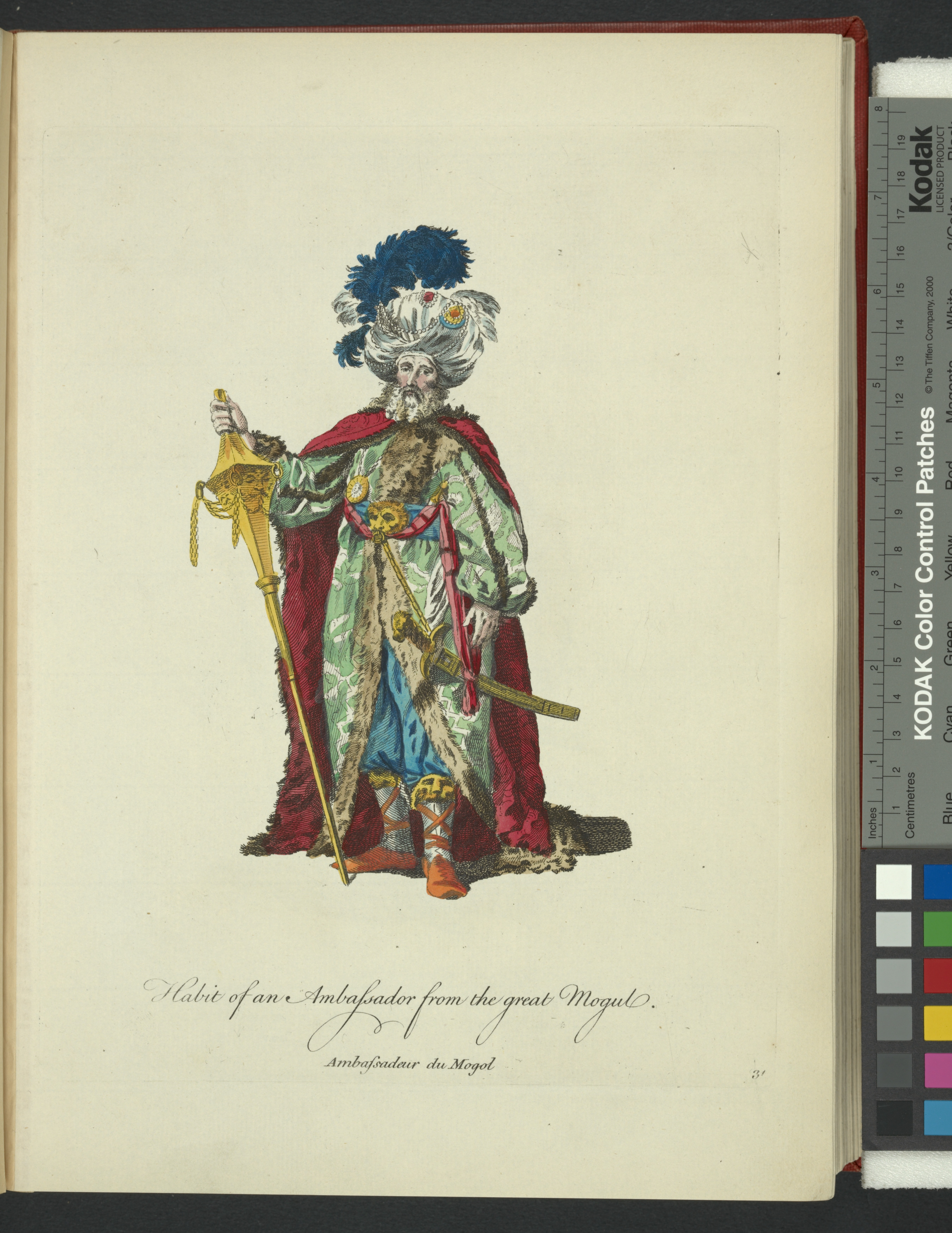
the Mughal Ambassador

In 1756, the Seven Years' War had broken out and Alamgir II was supported by various international belligerents of that war. It was the first global war in which the Mughal emperor had his involvement apart from the boundaries of India. Alamgir II was initially involved in that war because the British were hasty in their attempts to conquer Bengal Subah.

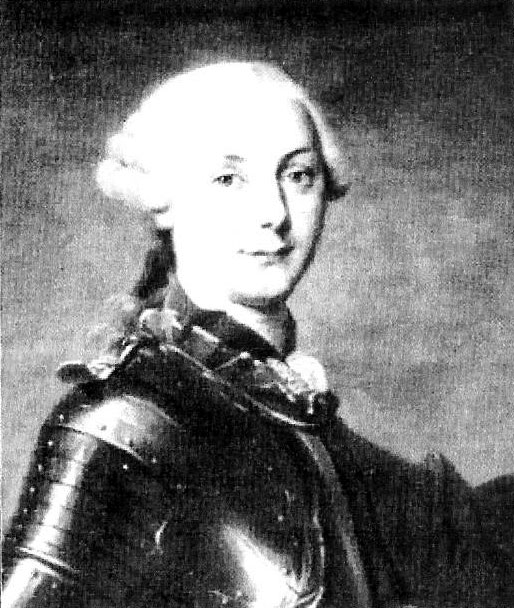
A portrait of Marquis de Bussy-Castelnau.

In 1755, De Bussy received letter from new Mughal Emperor Alamgir II requesting French assistance to put down the Maratha Confederacy. Alamgir II asked if it was possible for De Bussy to dispatch a French contingent of 1000 strong to protect the Mughal Empire's capital at Delhi. Alamgir II also promised to pay a hefty sum for the maintenance of the French and even promised to settle disputes in the Carnatic Wars in favour of the French East India Company.

In 1757, Alamgir II had successfully achieved peace between the Durrani Emirate and the Mughal Empire. Alamgir II even secured a matrimonial alliance when Timur Shah Durrani married Gauhar Afroz Begam the daughter of the Mughal Emperor Alamgir II in February 1757 and Ahmad Shah Durrani married Hazrat Begum the daughter of the former Mughal Emperor Muhammad Shah in 1757.

in the year 1751, the Swedish East India Company was operating in Surat as a co-belligerent of Alamgir II. They were probably instrumental in assisting the first Nawab of Junagadh.

It is believed that Alamgir II even tried to reconcile the English East India Company and the French East India Company before his death in 1759.

== Death ==
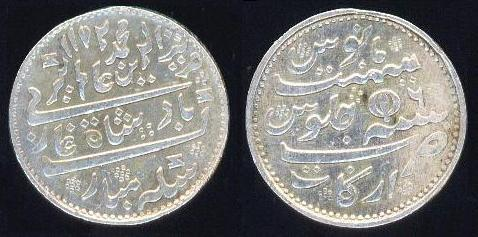
Silver rupee issued in the name of Alamgir II, date of AH 1172 (c. 1758).

The newly appointed Mughal Grand Vizier after Ahmad Shah Durrani's invasion was Najib-ud-Daula who tried to consolidate the remains of the Mughal Empire by uniting distant Faujdars (commanders), Nawab's and Nizams into a common cause against the Marathas. Fearing their wrath the deposed Imad-ul-Mulk aligned himself with the Maratha leader Sadashivrao Bhau and launched a counterattack against Najib-ud-Daula which lasted 15 days and resulted in the defeat of Najib-ud-Daula who was driven north.

Imad-ul-Mulk then feared that the Mughal Emperor Alamgir II would recall Ahmad Shah Durrani, or use his son Prince Ali Gauhar, to dispossess him of his newfound power with the Marathas. Therefore, Imad-ul-Mulk plotted to murder the Mughal Emperor Alamgir II and his family. A few Mughal Princes, including Ali Gauhar desperately managed to escape before assassination. In November 1759, the Mughal Emperor Alamgir II was told that a pious man had come to meet him, Alamgir II, ever so eager to meet holy men, set out immediately to meet him at Kotla Fateh Shah, he was stabbed repeatedly by Imad-ul-Mulk's assassins. The Mughal Emperor Alamgir II's death was mourned throughout the Mughal Empire, particularly by the Muslim populace.

== In popular culture ==
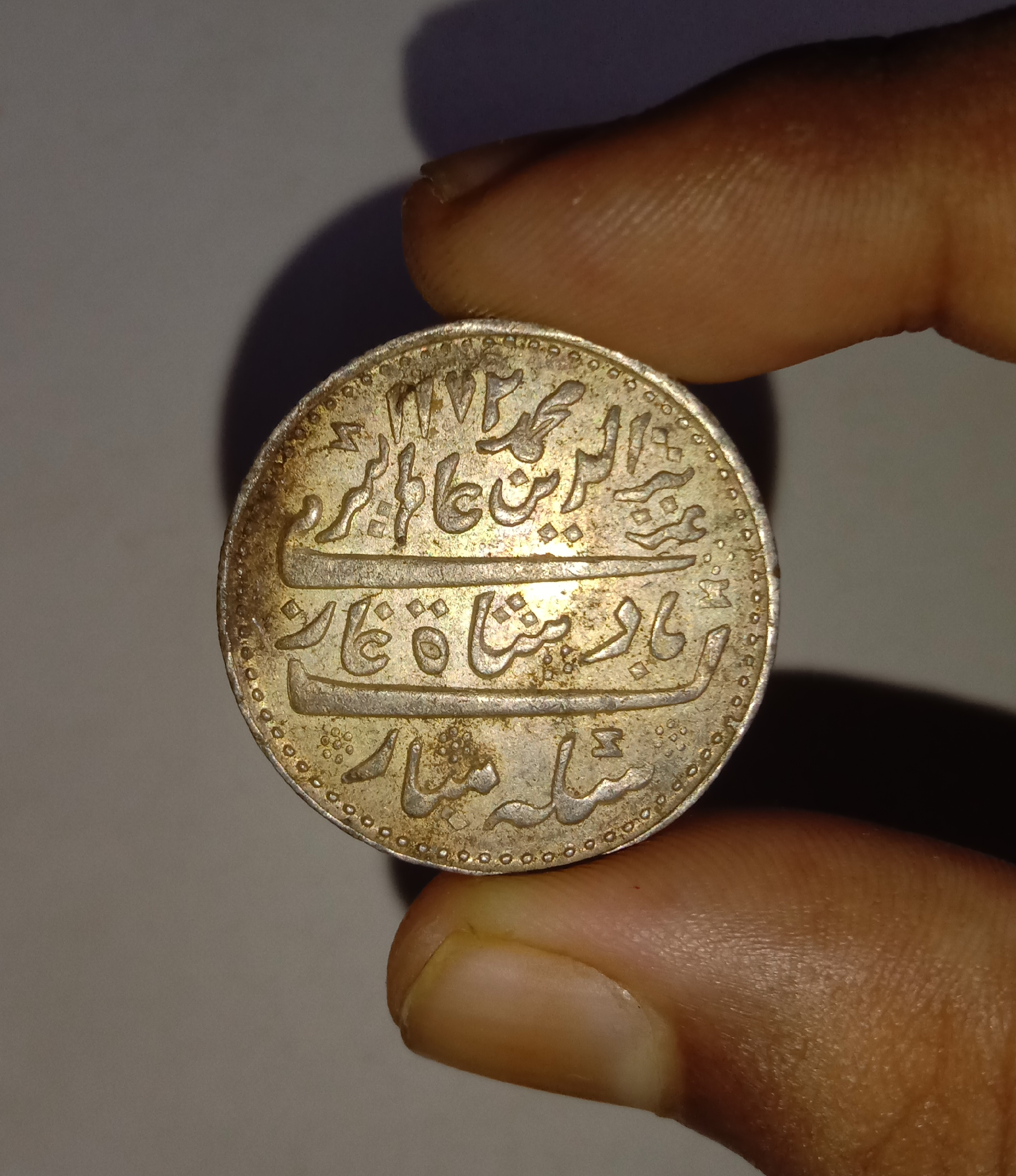
Silver Rupee of the Madras Presidency, minted in Arkat, struck in the name of Mughal emperor Alamgir II (posthumously).

- In the 2019 Bollywood war epic Panipat, the character of Alamgir II was portrayed by S. M. Zaheer.
- In the 1994 TV series The Great Maratha the character was portrayed by Arun Bali

== See also ==
- Shah Alam II
- Shivaji

Alamgir II Timurid dynasty
Preceded by Ahmad Shah Bahadur	Mughal Emperor; 2 June 1754– 29 November 1759	Succeeded by Shah Jahan III
