= Ahmad Shah Bahadur =

Mughal emperor from 1748 to 1754

Ahmad Shah Bahadur احمد شاه بهادر
- Padishah; Al-Sultan Al-Azam
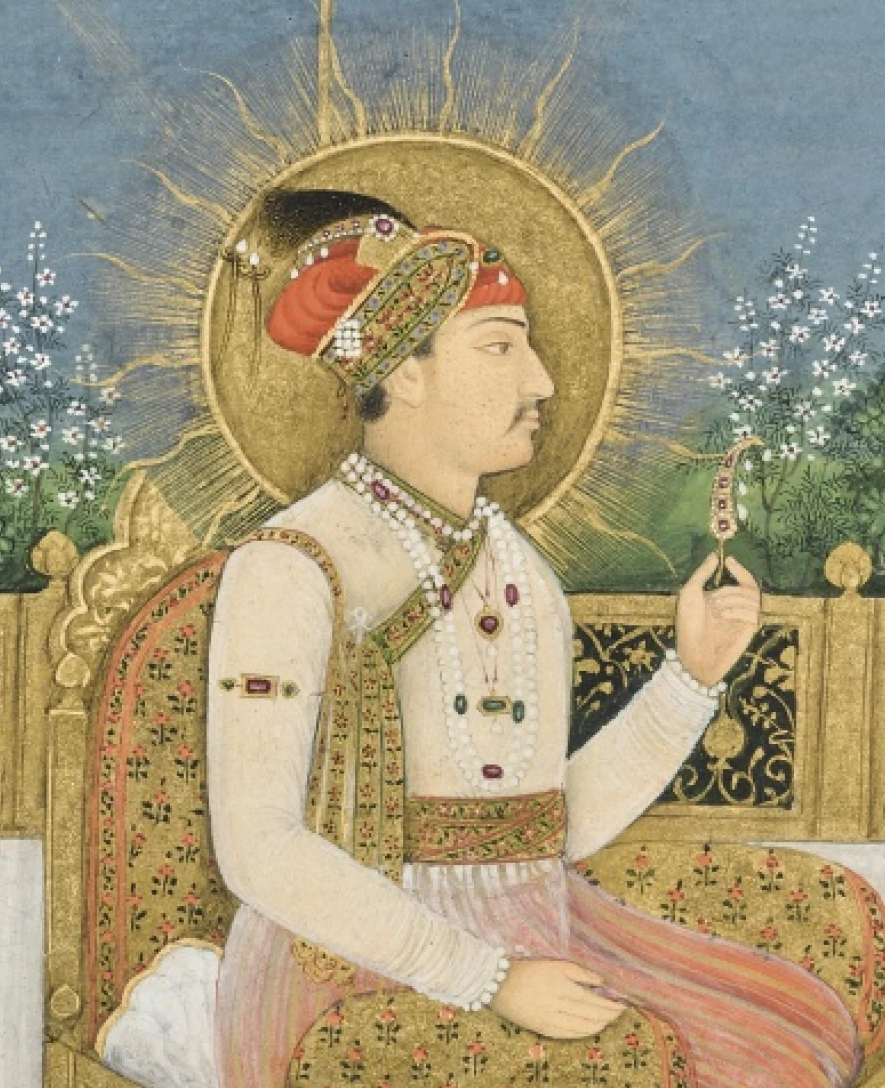
- Ahmad Shah enthroned, c. 1751

Mughal emperor
- Reign: 29 April 1748 – 2 June 1754
- Predecessor: Muhammad Shah
- Successor: Alamgir II
- Regent: Nawab Bahadur
- Viziers: Safdar Jung (1748–1753); Imad-ul-Mulk (1753–1754)
- Born: Mirza Ahmed Shah; 23 December 1725; Delhi, Delhi Subah, Mughal Empire
- Died: 1 January 1775 (aged 49); Delhi, Delhi Subah, Mughal Empire
- Burial: c. 1775; Moti Masjid, Mehrauli, Delhi, India
- Spouses: Inayetpuri Mahal; Sarfaraz Mahal; Rani Uttam Kumari
- Issue: Jahan Shah IV; Muhtaram-un-Nissa Begum; Dil Afruz Banu Begum
Names
- Mirza Abu-Nasir Mujahid ud-din Muhammad Ahmad Shah Bahadur Ghazi
- House: Mughal dynasty
- Dynasty: Timurid dynasty
- Father: Muhammad Shah
- Mother: Qudsia Begum
- Religion: Sunni Islam (Hanafi)
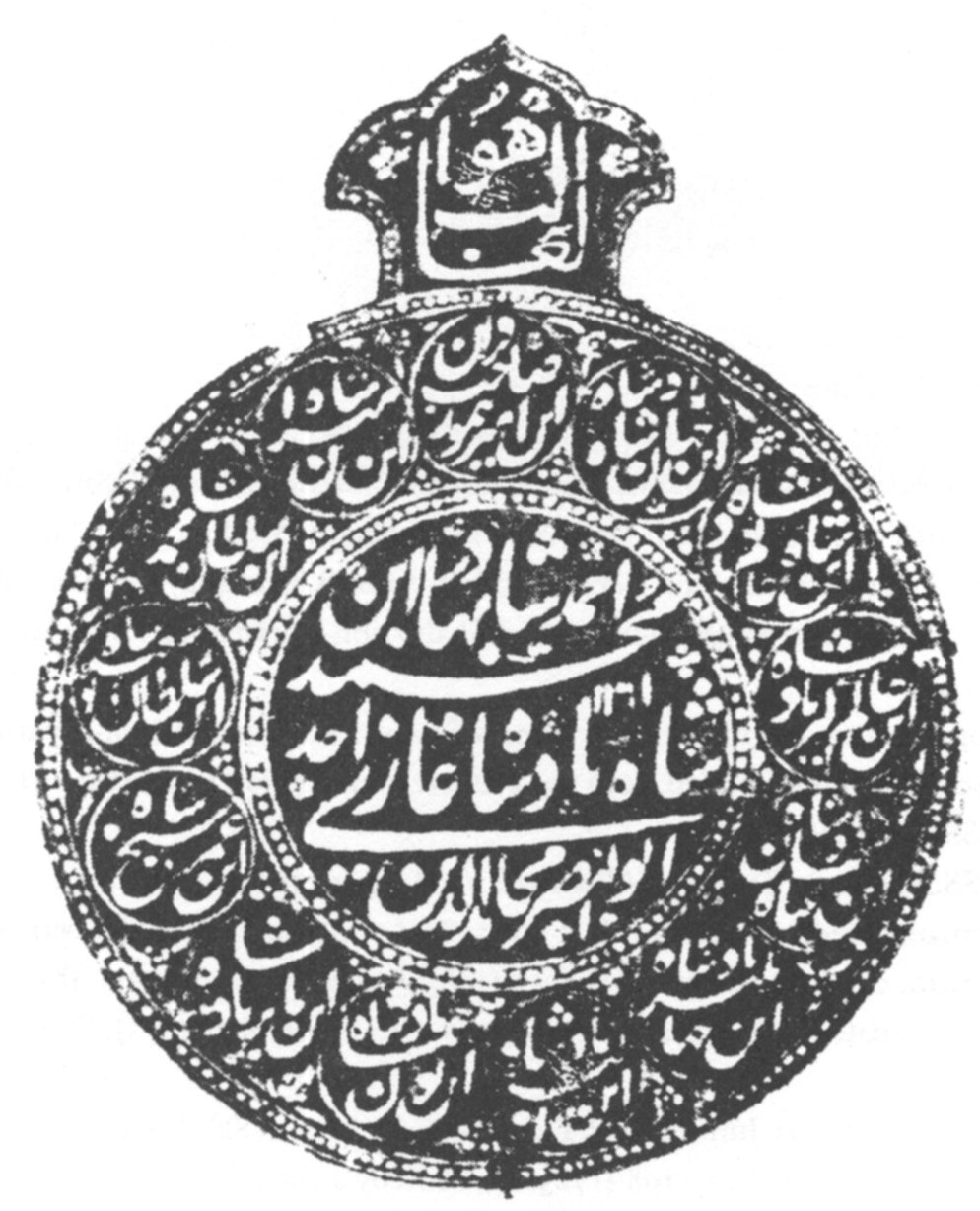
- Seal
- Military career
- Conflicts: Battle of Manupur (1748); Battle of Lahore (1752); Battle of Delhi (1753)

Ahmad Shah Bahadur (Persian: احمد شاه بهادر, 23 December 1725 – 1 January 1775), also known as Mirza Ahmad Shah or Mujahid-ud-Din Ahmad Shah Ghazi, was the fourteenth Mughal emperor from 1748 to 1754. Born to Emperor Muhammad Shah, he succeeded his father to the throne in 1748, at the age of 22. When Ahmed Shah Bahadur came to power, the Mughal Empire was in decline. Furthermore, his administrative weakness eventually led to the rise of the usurping Imad-ul-Mulk.

As a Prince, he defeated Ahmed Shah Abdali in the Battle of Manupur in 1748, Ahmed Shah Bahadur inherited a much weakened Mughal state as emperor for six years, but left all affairs of state to rivalling factions. He was deposed by the Vizier Imad-ul-Mulk and later blinded along with his mother. He spent the remaining years of his life in prison and died in 1775.

== Early life ==
He was born in 1725 to the Mughal Emperor Muhammad Shah and his consort Qudsia Begum. Decentralization during his father's reign, the Maratha Wars and the blow from Nadir Shah's invasion had initiated the decline of the Mughal Empire.

As a young Prince Ahmad developed a weakness for women, though this was restricted under his father's supervision. He is also known to have been an illiterate and never took part in military training, largely due to the attitude of his miserly father, who stinted him and used to browbeat him, never even giving him a sufficient allowance requisite of imperial princes, despite the fact that at that time there was still no shortage of funds for the imperial household. He was strongly supported by his step-mother, Badshah Begum, who adopted him as her own son, after the loss of her biological child; this was instrumental in his succession to the throne; as well as by his mother, who managed the state affairs along with the Head Eunuch of the harem, Javed Khan Nawab Bahadur, during his reign, since he sought the harem more than his duties to the empire.

Ahmad Shah Bahadur was known preference for the VOC Dutch merchants in India, and his collections of rare local hounds of India are somewhat almost documented.

== Ahmad Shah Durrani's First Invasion of India ==
After the death of the Mughal viceroy of Lahore, Zakariya Khan Bahadur, his two sons, Yahya Khan Bahadur and Mian Shah Nawaz Khan, the Emir of Multan, fought each other for succession. After defeating his elder brother Mian Shah Nawaz Khan declared himself the Mughal viceroy of Punjab. This weakness was quickly exploited by Ahmad Shah Durrani who initiated another campaign with 30,000 cavalry to assist Shah Nawaz Khan, who was resented for tax-evasion in the Mughal imperial court and opposed by the Grand Vizier, Qamar-ud-Din Khan, who was the father-in-law of Yahya Khan.

In April 1748, Ahmad Shah Abdali joined by Shah Nawaz Khan invaded the Indus River Valley, prompting Noor Mohammad Kalhoro, the Nawab of Sindh, to dispatch reinforcements to assist the Mughal Army along the river banks. Prince Ahmad and Qamar-ud-Din Khan, Hafiz Rahmat Khan, Safdarjung, Intizam-ud-Daula, Nasir Khan the former Subedar of Ghazni and Kabul, Yahya Khan and Ali Mohammed Khan were dispatched by Muhammad Shah to command a large army of 75,000 to confront the 12,000 advancing Durrani's. During the Battle of Manupur (1748), in Sirhind by the river Sutlej both forces fought a decisive battle and Prince Ahmad was nominally victorious after a Durrani wagon filled with gunpowder exploded, he was thereupon conferred with the title Bahadur. In spite of this victory, Muhammad Shah seriously mourned the fall of Qamaruddin Khan, who was killed during the battle by a stray artillery shell. After Ahmad Shah Durrani's retreat the Mughal aligned Khanate of Kalat, Nawab Amir of Bhawalpur remained aligned to Mughal Empire. Qamaruddin Khan's son Moin-ul-Mulk, (Mir Mannu) also a recognised war hero from the Battle of Manupur, was instituted as the Mughal Viceroy of Punjab, by the new Mughal Emperor Ahmad Shah Bahadur.

=== Military innovations ===
The Battle of Manupur had a considerable impact on the tactical prowess of Ahmad Shah Bahadur. When he became emperor, he is known to have introduced and organised the Purbiya camel corps particularly in the years 1751–54 to combat the invading Durranis and the rebellious Sikhs in the North-West regions of his empire.

== Succession ==
The news of his confidant, Qamaruddin Khan's death during the Sirhind conflict (Battle of Manupur (1748)) led to Muhammad Shah's grave sickness and eventual death soon afterwards. Prince Ahmad ascended the throne on 18 April 1748 and was crowned on 28 April 1748 at Red Fort in Delhi. He assumed the title Abu Nasir Mujahid-ud-Din Ahmad Shah Ghazi.

He appointed Safdarjung, the Nawab of Oudh, as Grand Vizier, Sayyid Salabat Khan the Kashmiri in-law of Farrukhsiyar as Mir Bakhshi and Amir-ul-Umara, and Moin-ul-Mulk, the son of Qamaruddin Khan, as the governor of Punjab

The main servant of the Mughal court, Javed Khan, was given the official title of Nawab Bahadur and an army of 5000. Together with the emperor's mother, who was given a force of 50,000, Javed Khan became the effective regent. Javed Khan's rise to power and his authority was seen as an affront to the nobility and the aristocracy of the empire, and in particular to the emperor's soldiers.

== Internal transgressions (1750–1754) ==
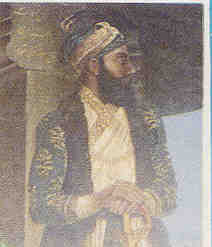
Safdarjung was a whistleblower against the cronyism of Qudsia Begum. He fell from grace due to his opposition to the eunuch Javed Khan.

Qudsia Begum made every effort to protect the high authority that was granted to Javed Khan and authorised him to use force against those who opposed and resented both him and her. After Safdarjung survived an assassination attempt in 1749 (plotted by Javed Khan), due to his response tensions erupted in the Mughal court when he tried to de-legitimise any relatives of his predeceasing Grand Viziers he also tried to drive out all the members of the imperial Afghan faction from positions of authority due to the stipends they received from the eunuch. These policies brought Safdarjung in conflict with the principal members of the Turani Faction and particularly Javed Khan.

In 1750, Javed Khan arrested the Mughal commander Sayyid Salabat Khan, who had demanded pay for his 18,000 troops who had been recalled to Delhi after completing the assigned expedition against Marwar. While imprisoned, Salabat Khan sold all his property to pay his troops in order to halt a possible revolt and thenceforth lived in poverty like a Dervish.

Angered by the policies of the Grand Vizier, Ahmad Khan Bangash attacked Safdarjung's possessions in Awadh, during which Safdarjung was wounded in the neck.

Safdarjung responded by amassing an army that included Jat and Maratha mercenaries. This defeated Qudsia Begum's loyalists in Rohilkhand, at which point Ahmad Shah demanded an immediate cease of hostilities. Safdarjung obeyed but also ordered his Turkish units, led by Muhammad Ali Jerchi, to assassinate Javed Khan for his involvement in the malevolence in August 1752.

Safdarjung's action cleared the path for the rise of Qudsia Begum's opponents within Javed Khan's faction, such as Intizam-ud-Daula.

== Campaign against Maratha Empire ==
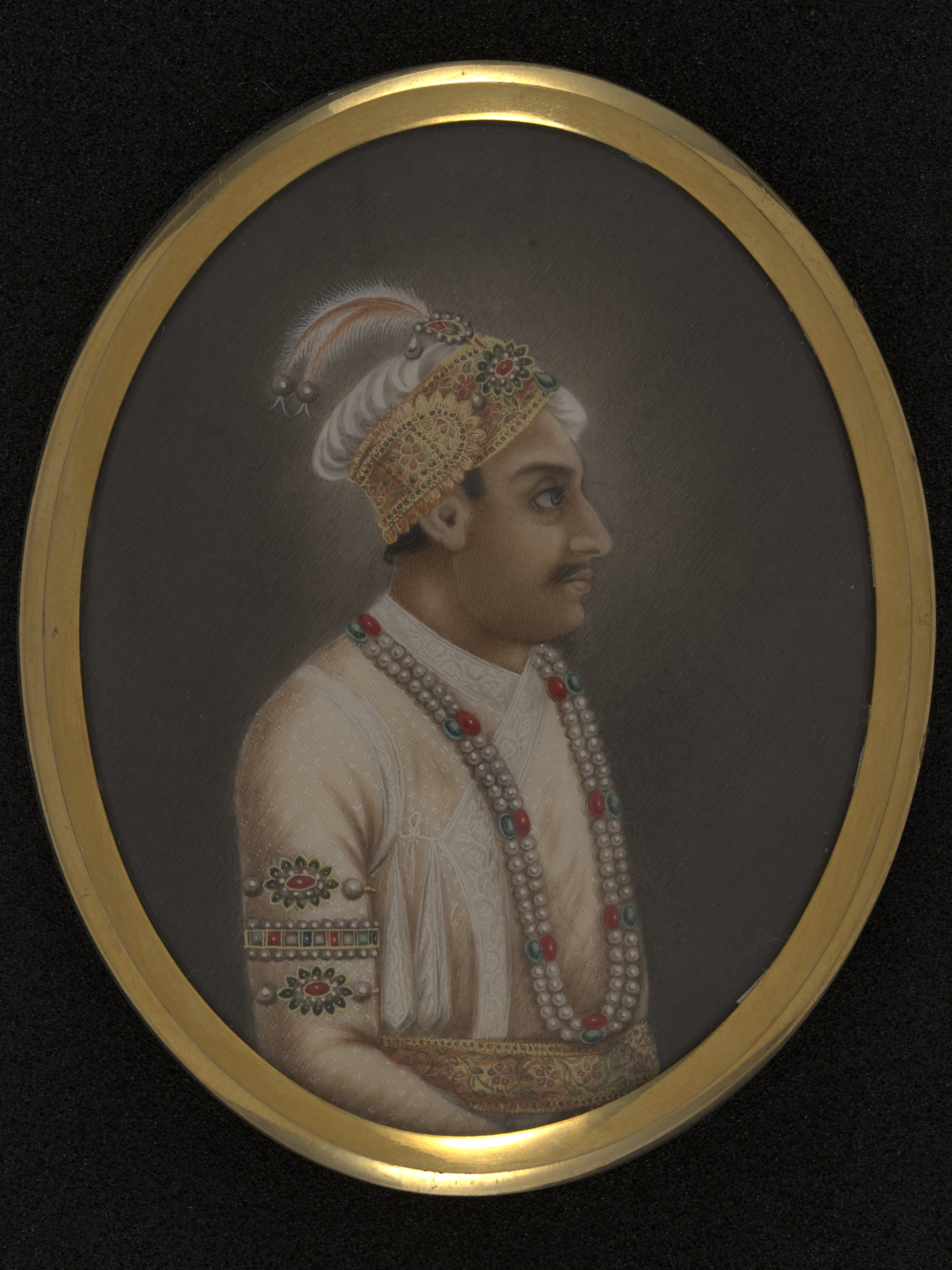
Ahmad Shah (1748-54).

In the year 1752 the Maratha Empire imposed a unilateral protectorate over the Mughal imperial court in Delhi This move caused the emperor and his subjects to retaliate against the Peshwa in 1754.

In May 1753, Ahmad Shah Bahadur chose the 18-year-old Ghazi ud-Din Khan Feroze Jung III famously known as Imad-ul-Mulk, the son of the dead Intizam-ud-Daula, to counter the growing influence of Safdarjung. Imad-ul-Mulk gathered opposition to Safdarjung, and was joined by Hafiz Rahmat Khan Barech, Qudsia Begum and Ahmad Shah Bahadur himself. Safdarjung was defeated and stripped of his estates and authority but the influence of his supporters such as Suraj Mal and the Capture of Delhi (1753) meant that he was forgiven and allowed to withdraw to Awadh.

In the aftermath of Delhi’s plundering and consequent alliance with the Marathas, Imad-ul-Mulk emerged as the new regent. However, his prowess was feared by Ahmad Shah Bahadur, who became estranged from him after Imad-ul-Mulk had collected 1,500,000 dams but refused to pay salaries to the Mughal army and imperial officials. Ahmad Shah Bahadur declared reinstatement of Safdarjung as his Grand Vizier. He tried to remove Imad-ul-Mulk from the imperial court, which caused Imad-ul-Mulk to send Aqibat Mahmud to arrest the emperor and then seek an alliance with the Maratha's led by Raghunathrao, the brother of the Peshwa Nanasaheb I.

Even though cannons and sharpshooters were loaded upon the elephants, the Emperor was defeated at Sikandarabad by the Maratha Empire.

According to the Marathas, 8000 warriors were captured (mostly women) and the imperial household was humiliated.

"Sikandarabad Incident" is considered to be the last raid conducted by the emperor against the Maratha empire.

But Imad-ul-Mulk and his allies had realised this plan. Aided by the Marathas, led by Malhar Rao Holkar, he defeated Safdarjung. The Emperor then collected a large army and camped at Sikandarabad, where the Maratha chieftain Raghunathrao, Malhar Rao Holkar and 2,000 Marathas, together with Imad-ul-Mulk, routed his army at the Battle of Sikandarabad (1754) and many Maratha soldiers raped the Imperial Mughal women including the princesses and queens of Mughal emperor Ahmad Shah. Ahmad Shah afterwards fled to Delhi, leaving his mother, wives and a retinue of 8,000 women behind. Imad-ul-Mulk with the support of Raghunathrao proceeded to Delhi, where he imprisoned both the emperor and his mother.

Meanwhile, following the battle at Sikandarabad, the ailing Safdarjung fled to Awadh and a Mughal general laid siege to Bhurtpore, which Suraj Mal and his Jat rebels controlled. After being reinstated as the Grand Vizier, Imad-ul-Mulk moved out of Delhi to support his lieutenant with a fresh supply of ammunition.

It was during this confrontation that Imad-ul-Mulk claimed that Ahmad Shah Bahadur sent secret dispatches to Suraj Mal, encouraging him to fight and promised to advance to the aid of the Jats. He had intercepted the letters, made peace with Suraj Mal, and returned to Delhi, where he blinded Ahmad Shah. After hearing of this action Safdarjung fell ill and died.

== Fragmented polities of the Mughal Empire ==
Ahmad Shah Bahadur inherited a weakened empire in both power and prestige. However, the Mughal Emperor still maintained symbolic hegemony over most other Indian princely states. Ahmad Shah maintained correspondence with distant loyal vassals and Nawabs, such as Chanda Sahib, Nawab of Tinnevelly (his southernmost subject), and Muzaffar Jung.

=== First Carnatic War (1746–1748) ===
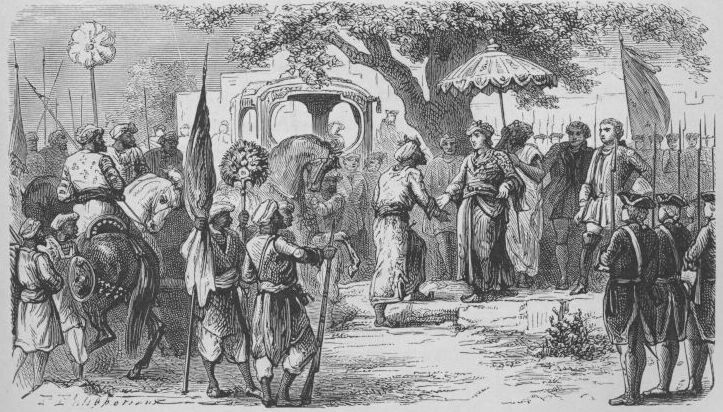
The Mughal Subedar of the Deccan Muzaffar Jang welcomes Joseph François Dupleix.

In 1749, Joseph François Dupleix allied with Chanda Sahib and Muzaffar Jung, the two strong designated Mughal administrators in the Deccan and sought bring them into power in their respective regions. Other leaders such as Hyder Ali also sided with the French. Soon the Chanda Sahib, Muzzafar Jung and the French led by Patissier and De Bussy had the capacity to defeat the alarmed Nawab of the Carnatic Anwaruddin Muhammed Khan during the Battle of Ambur.

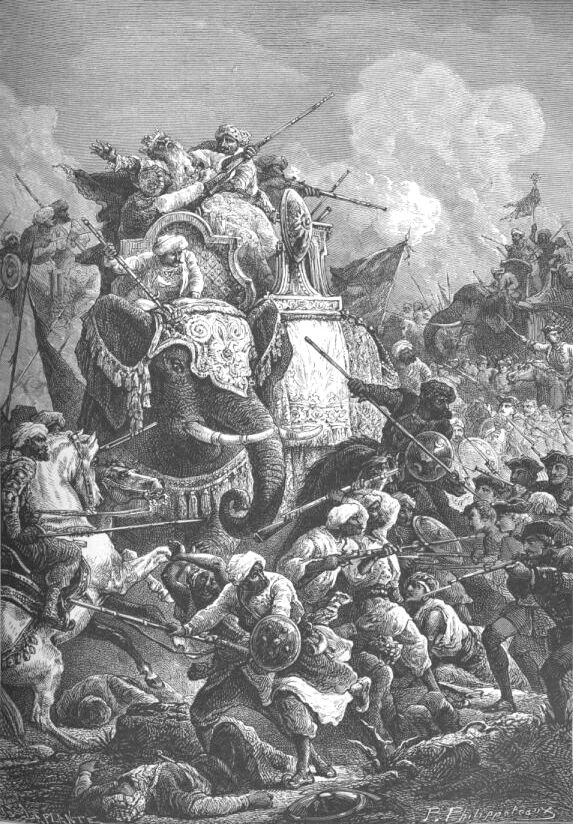
Death of the Nawab of Arcot in the Carnatic, during a battle against the French in 1749.

In response to this power struggle among the Mughal subjects in the Deccan, Muhammed Ali Khan Wallajah and Nasir Jung aligned themselves with the English in 1750. When Nasir Jung tried to recapture Gingee Fort, from De Bussy he was halted, defeated and killed by the forces of the troublesome Himmat Khan, the Nawab of Kadapa. Dupleix, who was the real power behind the successors, soon delegated a formidable governance to his allies: Muzaffar Jung was declared the Nizam of Mughal lands in eastern-Deccan and Chanda Sahib was declared the new Nawab of the Carnatic. The French were perceived as powerful aristocrats throughout the Mughal Empire; their English counterparts, however, had their reputations tarnished by the alleged acts of piracy since the days of Aurangzeb.

Stringer Lawrence and Nawab Wallajah in Madras

=== Ahmad Shah Bahadur and Nasir Jung ===
Previous Mughal Emperor, Muhammad Shah had bestowed upon Nizam-ul-Mulk, Asaf Jah I's son, Mir Ahmad Ali Khan Siddiqi Bayafandi, the title Nasir Jung, Later, Mughal Emperor Ahmad Shah Bahadur appointed him the Subedar of Deccan and bestowed him with the title Nasir-ud-Daula. However, Nasir Jung was killed by the renegade Himmat Khan in 1750.

=== Mughal Army expedition against Marwar ===
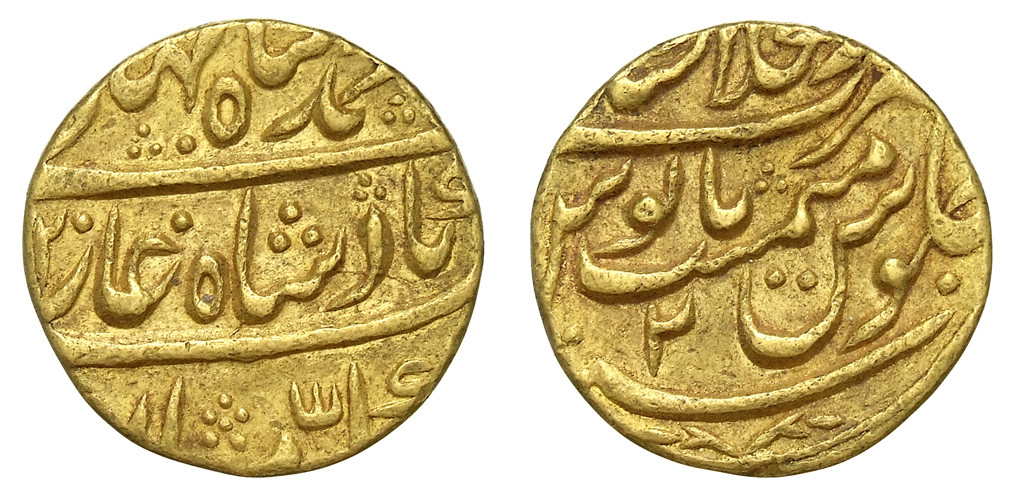
Coin of Ahmad Shah Bahadur

Salabat Khan, the Mir Bakhshi and commander of the Mughal army, was joined by Bhakt Singh in Marwar against the forces of Ram Singh and Ishvari Singh. The sides fought each other in 1750 at the Battle of Raona. Immediately after the battle, Ishwari Singh reconciled with Salabat Khan and the confrontation ended in ceasefire. Soon afterwards the Maratha Empire invaded Jaipur and Ishwari Singh committed suicide.

=== 2nd and 3rd Invasions of Ahmad Shah Abdali ===
In 1749, Ahmad Shah Abdali invaded India for a second time. The reasons for the invasion were the same as the first one, he claimed the revenue of 4 districts (Sarkars) of Punjab assigned for the support of the impoverished Subah of Kabul, an arrangement which existed previously in Mughal times and was imposed on the Mughals after they ceded that Subah to Nadir Shah in 1739. Abdali's forces fought Moin-ul-Mulk, the Mughal governor of Punjab, to a stalemate, but the latter was duped into signing a treaty accepting Abdali's demands.

The terms of the 1749 not being fulfilled, Abdali invaded India a third time in 1752 and swept all before him before the gates of Lahore. Here a fierce battle was fought, and Moin-ul-Mulk's brave lieutenant, Raja Koramal was killed. Moin-ul-Mulk was captured, but Abdali pardoned him due to his courageousness in battle, afterwards reappointed him governor of the Subah. The Mughal Court became frantic lest a repeat of 1739 should occur. The Grand Wazir, Safdar Jung enlisted the help of 50,000 Marathas on promise of a large sum of money, but before he could do anything, an equally frantic Emperor signed a peace treaty with the Abdali, acting upon the advice of his mother's favourite, the eunuch Javed Khan Nawab Bahadur. According to the terms of the treaty, Punjab (including Multan and Sindh) and Kashmir were to be administered by the Abdali in the Emperor's name, and any Governor of the Subah appointed by the Emperor had to have Abdali's approval. This was only a face saving gesture, in reality the Subah's had been ceded to the Afghans. They would be officially annexed by them in 1757, following Imad-ul-Mulk's aborted attempt to restore them to Mughal control.

=== Loss of Gujarat and Orissa to the Maratha Empire ===
Various chieftains of the Maratha Empire had defeated the subjects of Ahmad Shah Bahadur in Gujarat and Orissa. Until 1753 Gujarat continued to be a part of the Mughal Empire, but in that year the Imperial Governor was deposed by the Marathas, and it was during that havoc that the Raj Bovri Mosque complex was destroyed during a massive fray. In response to the annexation of Gujarat, the Mughal Emperor Ahmad Shah Bahadur appointed and strengthened the Nawab of Junagarh Nawab Muhammad Bahadur Khanji and bestowed various titles and authority to various entities loyal to the Mughal Empire in the region. Ahmad Shah Bahadur and Safdarjung also dispatched Salabat Khan and an army of 18,000 to an expedition to quell all rebels in Rajput territories and to gather support for the regions garrisons.

==== Alivardi Khan loses Orissa ====
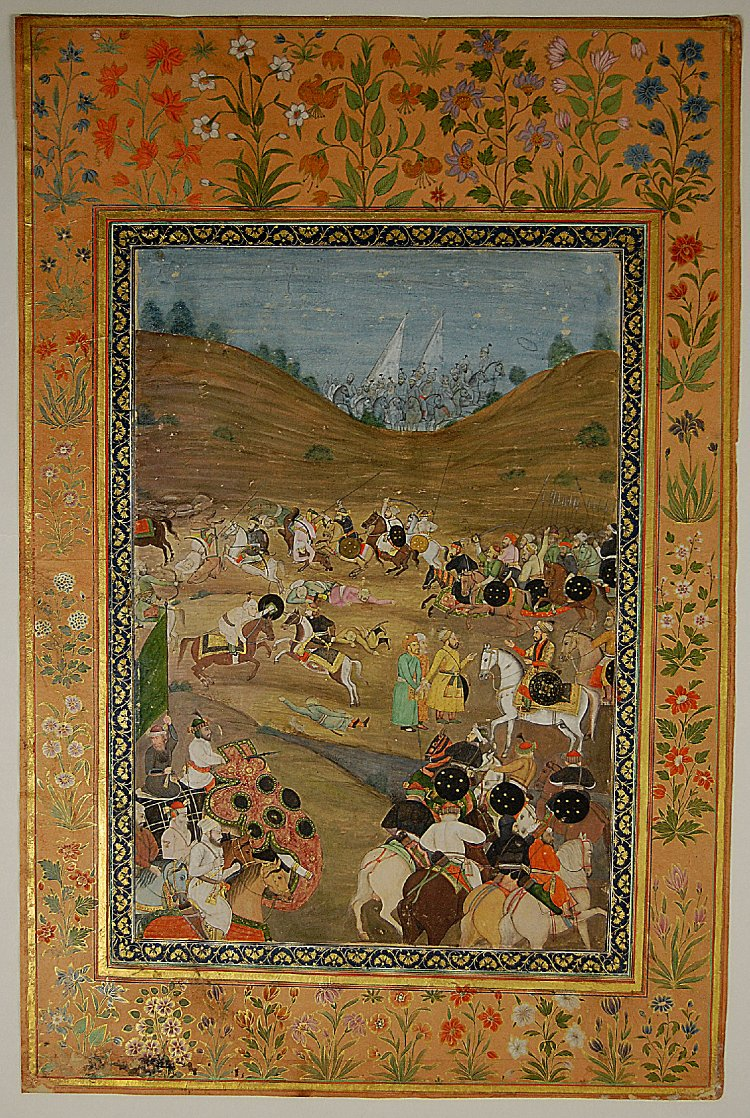
Alivardi Khan (Mughal Empire's viceroy of Bangal) captures two prisoners.

In 1751 after defending his territories from the Marathas for nearly 11 years, Alivardi Khan the Nawab of Bengal, and Faujdars from various regions such as Patna, Dacca and Orissa were overrun by large force of Marathas under the command of Raghoji I Bhonsle, who eventually annexed Odisha for the Maratha Empire. Only Midnapore remained in Mughal hands, and Alivardi Khan, the Mughal governor of Bengal, was forced to pay the Chauth tribute to the Marathas, as had been instructed to him by the late Emperor Muhammad Shah.

=== Second Carnatic War (1749–1754) ===
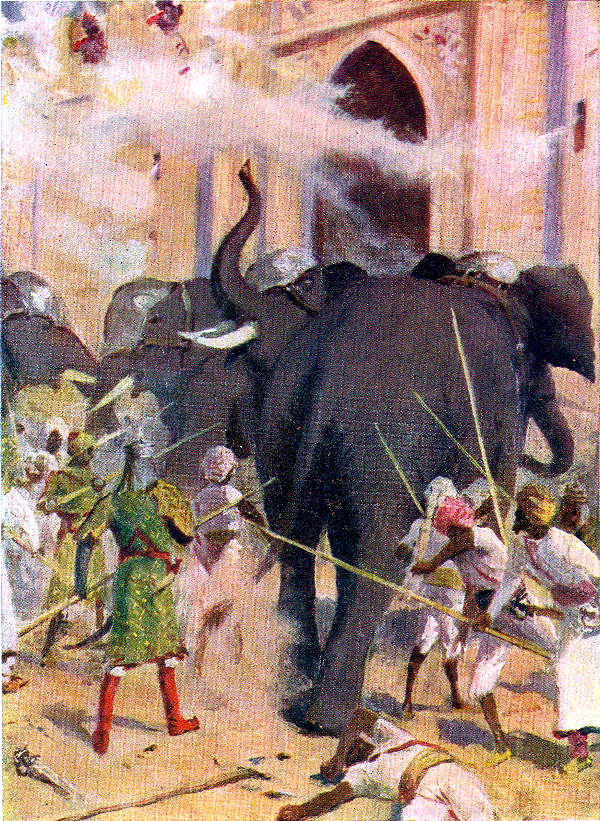
Siege of Arcot was a major battle fought between Robert Clive and the combined forces of the Mughal Empire's Nawab of the Carnatic, Chanda Sahib, assisted by a small number of troops from the French East India Company.

In 1751, Chanda Sahib and his lieutenants Reza Sahib and Muhammed Yusuf Khan were defeated by Muhammed Ali Khan Wallajah and Clive during the Battle of Arcot. Later onwards Muzaffar Jung faced the averse uncooperative Nawabs of Kurnool, Cuddapah and Savanur after they jointly attacked Muzaffar Jung's encampments of 3000 troops, during the confrontation the Nawab of Savanur was killed, the Nawab of Kurnool was shot and wounded but the apathetic Himmat Khan, the Nawab of Kadapa, challenged Muzaffar Jung to a duel. Charging their Howdah's at each other, they eliminated each other in combat.

=== French-Nizam Alliance ===
The news of Muzaffar Jung's death had created a great sense of shock and panic among the Mughals and the French were also affected by this unforeseeable event. De Bussy rose to the occasion and almost risked the wrath of the imperial court when he chose his brother Salabat Jung as the new Subedar of the Deccan, without the approval of Ahmad Shah Bahadur. Together they entered Hyderabad on 12 April and then marched against the Marathas to strengthen the Mughal garrison at Aurangabad on 18 June. Unwilling to allow his brother to gain power, Intizam-ud-Daula, an influential general in the Mughal army, abandoned his post and threatened to march into the Deccan with an army of 150,000 and overthrow Salabat Jung with the assistance of their Maratha adversary Balaji Bajirao.

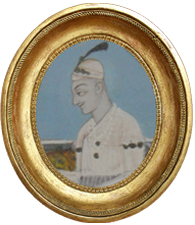
Salabat Jung and his French allies had inflicted defeat upon the Maratha Confederacy and enforced the Peace Treaty of Ahmadnagar.

French general De Bussy initially advanced through northern Maharashtra, but was ultimately compelled to withdraw by the traditional Maratha tactics of cutting of all the grain supplies. The conflict between the Nizam under De Bussy and the Peshwa ended with Treaty of Bhalke (1751) in which the Nizam Salabat Jung surrendered half of the revenues of Khandesh, plus the western half of Berar, plus the small province of Baglan (south and west of Khandesh) to the Marathas while retaining the cities of Aurangabad and Burhanpur and their associated forts - Daulatabad and Asir.

Intizam-ud-Daula was poisoned by his own troops for pursuing an alliance with Balaji Bajirao. The Nawab of the Carnatic Chanda Sahib was killed in a mutiny after he was defeated by Muhammed Ali Khan Wallajah and Clive in 1752. Muhammed Ali Khan Wallajah was then recognised as the next Nawab of the Carnatic, mainly by arousing the sympathies of Ahmad Shah Bahadur.

In 1756 Salabat Jung's forces utilised heavy muskets known as Catyocks, which were attached to the ground, it was known to have fired more rapidly than a cannon.

== Death ==
After his deposition in 1754, Ahmad Shah Bahadur was imprisoned at the Salimgarh Fort. He stayed there for the rest of his life, dying in 1775 at the age of 49 during the reign of Emperor Shah Alam II. One of his sons, (Mahmud Shah Bahadur Bidar-Bakht) reigned briefly in 1788 as Shah Jahan IV.

His tomb is located in a burial enclosure enjoined to the Moti Masjid, in the vicinity of Qutbuddin Bakhtiyar Kaki's dargah in Mehrauli.

Ahmad Shah Bahadur Timurid dynasty
Preceded by Muhammad Shah	Mughal Emperor; 26 April 1748– 2 June 1754	Succeeded by Alamgir II
