= Ghazi ud-Din Khan Feroze Jung II =

Mughal noble (1708–1752)

Intizam-ud-Daula, Ghazi ud-Din Khan Siddiqi Bayafandi Feroze Jung II (13 March 1708 – 16 October 1752) was the eldest son of Asaf Jah I Mir Qamaruddin Khan Siddiqi. He was born on 13 March 1709, his mother was Sa'id un-Nisa Begum, the daughter of a Sayyid nobleman at Gulbarga. He died in Aurangabad on 16 October 1752.

== Biography ==
In 1748, Asaf Jah I died and a family feud for the Nizamship ensued. Nasir Jung, second son of Asaf Jah I was overseeing the affairs of Deccan during the intermittent absence of Asaf Jah and claimed it for himself immediately after his death. Asaf Jah's third son Salabat Jang and grandson Muzaffar Jang were also in the fray. But Nasir Jung and Muzzafar Jung soon lost their lives and it was almost certain that Salabat Jang would inherit the position of Nizam.

Meanwhile, Ghazi ud-Din rose to the status of Captain General during the reign of Mughal emperor Ahmad Shah Bahadur. Refusing to be side-lined, he goaded Emperor Ahmad Shah Bahadur to issue a farman proclaiming him the subahdar of the Deccan. To stake a claim on Hyderabad, he formed an alliance with the Maratha Empire, agreeing to cede Khandesh and the territories to the west of the Berar, from the Tapti to the Godavari, and pay one million five hundred thousand rupees.

He reached the Deccan in September 1752 with a Maratha force from Delhi but died on 16 October in Aurangabad; poisoned at a dinner he attended at the behest of Nizam Ali's mother.

Before retiring to the Deccan, he installed his eldest son Ghazi ud-Din Khan Feroze Jung III better known as Imad-ul-Mulk in the Mughal court, where played a crucial role and kingmaker in the politics of Delhi for next several years.
