= Ghazi ud-Din Khan Feroze Jung III =

Mughal grand vizier from 1754 to 1760

- Imad-ul-Mulk; Amir-ul-umara
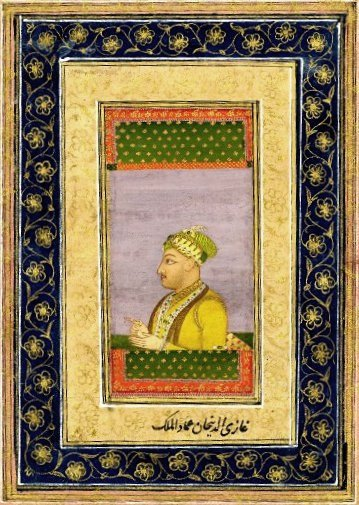
- Portrait

Grand Vizier of the Mughal Empire
- Tenure: June 1754 – March 1760
- Predecessor: Intizam-ud-Daulah
- Successor: Najib ad-Dawlah
- Born: Shahabuddin Feroz; June 1737; Narwar, Gwalior State, Maratha Empire
- Died: c. 1800; Khairpur, Sind State, Durrani Empire
- Spouse: Ganna Begum
Names
- Nizam Shahabuddin Muhammad Feroz Khan
- Dynasty: Asaf Jahi
- Father: Feroze Jung II

Feroze Jung III or Nizam Shahabuddin Muhammad Feroz Khan also known by his sobriquet Imad-ul-Mulk, was the grand vizier of the Mughal Empire.

He was the son of Ghazi ud-Din Khan Feroze Jung II and a grandson of the founder of the Asaf Jahi dynasty, Nizam-ul-Mulk, Asaf Jah I. After the death of his father in 1752, he was recommended by Nawab Safdar Jung to be appointed as Mir Bakhshi (Pay Master General) and received the titles of Amir ul-Umara (Noble of Nobles) and Imad ul-Mulk (Pillar of the Realm).

A controversial figure, Imad is well known for deposing, imprisoning and blinding Mughal emperor Ahmad Shah Bahadur, assassinating emperor Alamgir II, and torturing their family members including future emperor Shah Alam II.

He was declared to be an apostate by various Islamic scholars, including Shah Waliullah Dehlawi, and Durrani emperor Ahmad Shah Abdali.

== Early life and rise to power ==
Feroz Jung was raised under the scrutiny and austerity of his father Ghazi ud-Din, spending his days under the care of tutors and mullahs, and allowed the company of only eunuchs on Fridays. He was never allowed to mix with children of his own age or attend performances by musicians or dancing girls. He was appointed to the Mughal court by his father Feroze Jung II in 1752. The historian William Dalrymple describes the result as a "precocious intellectual achievement...undermined by unbounded ambition and profound immorality that led to his turning on all who helped him, starting with his patron Safdar Jang."

Safdar Jang, the Nawab of Awadh, and Wazir-ul-Malik-i-Hindustan (Prime Minister of Hindustan), had intervened to secure Feroz Jung's estates after the death of his father and had appointed him the imperial paymaster at the age of sixteen. The French military commander Jean Law described that Safdar Jang regarded Feroz Jung "like his own son and could scarcely have imaged that he was actually nursing a serpent at his breast."

Emperor Ahmad Shah Bahadur chose Feroz Jung to counter the powerful Safdar Jang. He formed a coalition with Hafiz Rahmat Khan Barech and Qudsia Begum, the emperor's mother to outmaneuver Safdar Jang out of the court.

According to Dalrymple, in 1753, a "civil war between the old vizier and his teenage replacement raged across the suburbs of the city for six months, from March to November, with the old and new cities of Delhi held by rival factions." Safdar Jang's Old Delhi stronghold was looted and destroyed, never to recover. According to the Mughal historian Ghulam Hussain Khan, "Old Delhi, which used to be even wealthier and populous than the new city, Shahjahanabad, was plundered and sacked so thoroughly that an infinity of people lost their consorts and children, and were totally ruined, besides numbers that were massacred." Safdar Jang would be forced to retreat to Awadh and would never recover, dying less a year later, due to the "shock and grief at his fall."

== De facto emperor ==
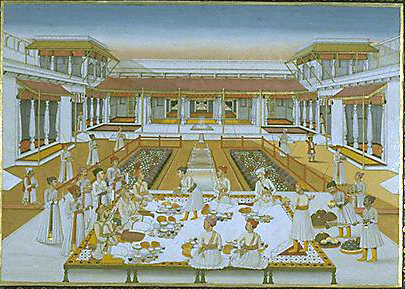
Imad ul-Mulk holds a banquet

Imad-ul-Mulk emerged as the de facto ruler of Delhi by calling on the Marathas for help and instigating them to attack the Jats of Bharatpur. The Marathas laid siege over the Kumher fort on 1 January 1754 but were unable to overcome the resistance of Suraj Mal. Imad-ul-Mulk had collected 1,500,000 dams but refused to pay salaries to the Mughal army and imperial officials, estranging him from the emperor.

Ahmad Shah Bahadur declared the reinstatement of Safdar Jang as his Grand Vizier and tried to remove Imad-ul-Mulk from the imperial court. This caused him to send Aqibat Mahmud to arrest the emperor and then seek an alliance with the Raghunath Rao, the brother of Maratha Peshwa Nanasabeb I.

=== Deposing Emperor Ahmad Shah Bahadur ===
The Marathas, aided by Malhar Rao Holkar, defeated Ahmad Shah Bahadur's army in what came to be known as Battle of Sikandrabad (1754) in May 1754 and captured members of the emperor's household, including 8,000 women. Ahmad Shah Bahadur fled toward Delhi while the ailing Safdar Jang fled to Awadh. Imad-ul-Mulk, with the support of Raghunath Rao, proceeded to Delhi, and deposed Ahmad Shah Bahadur on 2 June 1754 and imprisoned at the Salimgarh Fort in December.

Imad-ul-Mulk released Prince Aziz-ud-Din from prison and crowned him emperor with the regnal name Alamgir II. The 55-year-old prince had been in prison since 1714 when his father emperor Jahandar Shah was overthrown by Farrukhsiyar. He had no experience of administration or warfare, serving as another puppet Mughal emperor with all power vested with Imad-ul-Mulk. He supposedly intercepted the secret dispatches from Ahmad Shah Bahadur to Suraj Mal where the imprisoned emperor promised to aid to the Jats if they continued to hold out against the Mughal army besieging Bharatpur. Imad-ul-Mulk made peace with Suraj Mal, returned to Delhi and had Ahmad Shah Bahadur and his mother Qudsia Begum blinded with hot needles.

=== Ahmad Shah Durrani's invasion ===
Afghan emperor Ahmad Shah Durrani invaded India for the fourth time in 1756, on the invitation of Mughlani Begum to defeat Sikh rebels in Punjab. They conquered the Lahore, Sirhind, Delhi, Vrindavan and plundered Mathura.

Ahmad Shah occupied Delhi in January 1757 and imprisoned emperor Alamgir II. He attempted to impose an alliance on the Mughals by marrying Hadrat Begum, the daughter of Muhammad Shah, and having his son Timur Shah Durrani marry Zuhra Begum, daughter of Alamgir II. In April 1757, Ahmad Shah reinstalled Alamgir II as the titular emperor, and began his return to Afghanistan. However, actual control of Delhi was given to Najib-ud-Daula, the Rohilla Mir Bakhshi of the Mughal army who had defected to support Ahmad Shah's invasion, in return for an annual tribute of 20 lakh rupees. Ahmad Shah Durrani returned to Kabul, leaving his forces led by Timur Shah, consolidating themselves inside the garrisons of Lahore.

After the departure of the Afghans from Delhi, Imad-ul-Mulk, who had been paying the Marathas a tribute, invited them to remove the Rohillas from Delhi. In the ensuing Battle of Delhi, a 40,000-strong Maratha army led by Raghunath Rao expelled Najib ad-Dawlah from the city. The Marathas, now the de facto rulers of Delhi, appointed Antaji Mankeshwar as the governor and retained Alamgir II as the emperor. Imad-ul-Mulk would be declared an 'apostate' by Islamic scholars and Ahmad Shah Durrani for inviting the Hindu Marathas to defeat the Muslim Rohilla Afghans.

=== Maratha conquest of Lahore ===
In 1758, Peshwa Raghunath Rao drove out Timur Shah Durrani and Jahan Khan out of Lahore after extracting imperial wealth from Imad-ul-Mulk. The Afghans were forced to retreat to Peshawar under the force of Maratha and Sikh attacks. The combined Maratha-Sikh force massacred the Afghan garrison, wounding Jahan Khan and killing his son. The Afghans quickly vacated the forts of Peshawar and Attock and retreated west to Afghanistan. Buoyed by success, Ragunath Rao grandiosely sacked Delhi and signalled his intention to place his brother Balaji Baji Rao's son Vishwasrao on the Mughal throne.

=== Escape of Prince Ali Gauhar and assassination of Alamgir ===
"Some ill-designing people had turned his brain, and carried him to the eastern part of the Empire, which would be the cause of much trouble and ruin to our regimes."

— Feroze Jung III's letter to Mir Jafar, after the escape of the Mughal crown prince Ali Gauhar.

Imad-ul-Mulk feared that emperor Alamgir would invite Ahmad Shah Durrani or use his son, Prince Ali Gauhar to dispossess him of his newfound power. He began to plot the assassination of the emperor and members of the royal family in the winter of 1759. Fearing for his life, Wali al-Ahd (crown prince) Ali Gauhar organised a milita and escaped Delhi for the Bengal Subah to strengthen his position by attempting to regain control over Bengal, Bihar and Odisha. Imad-ud-Mulk ordered Mir Jafar, the Nawab of Bengal to advance as far as Patna to capture or kill Ali Gauhar.

In November 1759, emperor Alamgir II was told that a pious man had come to meet him; ever so eager to meet holy men, set out immediately to meet him at Kotla Fateh Shah, he was stabbed repeatedly by Imad-ul-Mulk's assassins. The emperor's death would be mourned throughout the empire, but particularly among the Muslim populance. Maratha Peshwa Raghunath Rao, under the influence of Sadashivrao Bhau, considered abolishing the Mughal empire, and placing his son Vishwasrao on the Mughal throne by bribing or deposing Imad-ul-Mulk.

Sadashivrao Bhau then personally chose Shah Jahan III as the new Mughal Emperor and began a campaign of plundering the jewels and ornaments of the Mughal imperial court; defacing Mughal mosques, tombs and shrines in Agra and Delhi, and desecrating the imperial Moti Masjid, and looting its exquisite jewelled decorations.

=== Fall from power ===
Ali Gauhar and his 30,000-strong Mughal army, were reinforced by the forces of Shuja-ud-Daula, Najib-ud-Daula and Ahmad Khan Bangash. The Mughals were also joined by Jean Law de Lauriston and 200 Frenchmen, who had been waging a campaign against the British as a part of the Seven Years' War. Ali Gauhar intended to overthrow Mir Jafar and Imad-ul-Mulk by advancing toward Awadh and Patna in 1759. Forced to flee Delhi, Imad-ul-Mulk was replaced as Grand Vizier by Najib-ud-Daula after Ahmad Shah issued a farman recognising Prince Ali Gauhar as the Mughal emperor Shah Alam II.

The defeat of Alamgir II's son-in-law, Timur Shah Durrani by the Marathas in the year 1760, provoked the wrath of Ahmad Shah Durrani, who launched a massive campaign gathering more troops than ever before. At the Battle of Panipat in January 1761, a coalition of Afghan, Rohilla and Awadh troops defeated the Marathas, shattering their influence over the Mughal imperial throne and over northern India.

== Later life and death ==
According to the biography of the poet Gulzar Ibrahim, Imad-ul-Mulk was living in strained circumstances in 1780. In 1784, he formed an arrangement with the Maratha Peshwa and received Baoni as jagir.

Subsequently, he proceeded to Surat where he passed a few years with the English and then went on the Hajj. He composed Persian and Rekhta poetry and left Arabic and Turkish Ghazals and a thick Persian Diwan and a Masnawi Fakhria-tun_Nizam and Nalaa-e-Ny relating the miracles of Maulana Fakhar-ud-Din under the pen name Nizam.

Under the influence of Sufism, Imad-ul-Mulk abandoned political career and moved to Maharshrif, Chishtian to live with Noor Muhammad Maharvi. He poetically described Maharvi's death, حیف واویلا جہاں بے نور گشت (What a pity, where there is no light) in 1205 Hijri, indicating his residence in Maharshrif until at least 1791 CE. After Maharvi's death, Imad-ul-Mulk moved to Khairpur and died there in 1800, where his grave is located.

His wife was the celebrated Ganna Begum, who died in 1775.

He was succeeded by his son Naser-ad-Daula as the Nawab of Baoni jagir. He also had many other sons, and among them, Hamid-ad-Daula entered the service of Asaf Jah II, the Nizam of Hyderabad, and obtained a mansabdari of 5000.

== Popular culture ==
In the 2019 Bollywood war epic Panipat, the character of Imad-ul-Mulk and his role in the events leading up to the Third Battle of Panipat is portrayed by Mir Sarwar.

In the TV series The Great Maratha 1994 the role was played by Jitendra Trehan.

== See also ==
- Hyderabad State
- Nizam
