= Safdar Jang =

Nawab of Awadh from 1739 to 1754

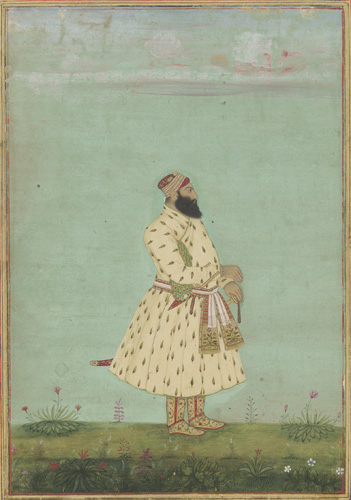

2nd Nawab of Awadh
- In office 19 March 1739 – 5 October 1754
- Monarch: Muhammad Shah; Ahmad Shah Bahadur; Alamgir II
- Preceded by: Saadat Khan
- Succeeded by: Shuja-ud-Daula

Mughal Grand Vizier
- In office 1748–1753
- Preceded by: Mir Fazil Qamar-ud-Din Khan
- Succeeded by: Intizam-ud-Daulah

Personal details
- Born: 1708
- Died: 5 October 1754 (aged 45–46) Sultanpur, Kingdom of Awadh
- Resting place: Safdarjung's Tomb, New Delhi
- Spouse: Nawab Sadar Jahan Ara Begum nee (Sadr-un-Nisa Begum)
- Children: Shuja-ud-Daula
- Parents: Siyadat Khan (Mirza Jafar Khan Beg) (father); sister of Saadat Ali Khan I (mother)

Asaf Jah Jamat-ul-Mulk Shuja-ud-Daula Nawab Abul Mansur Khan Bahadur Safdar Jang Sipah Salar (c. 1708 – 5 October 1754), better known as Safdar Jang, was the second Nawab of Kingdom of Awadh succeeding Saadat Khan (his maternal uncle and father-in-law) in the year 1739 and Mughal Grand Vizier from 1748 to 1753. All future Nawabs of Awadh were patriarchal descendants of Safdar Jang. He was a major political figure at the imperial Mughal court during its declining years.

== Biography ==
He was a descendant of Qara Yusuf of the Qara Qoyunlu confederation. In 1735, he was given the rank of sipahsalar. In 1739, he succeeded his father-in-law and maternal uncle, Burhan-ul-Mulk Saadat Khan to the throne of Awadh/Oudh and ruled from 19 March 1739 to 5 October 1754. The Mughal Emperor Muhammad Shah gave him the title of "Safdar Jang".

Safdar Jang was an able administrator. He was not only effective in keeping control of Awadh, but also managed to render valuable assistance to the weakened Emperor Muhammad Shah. He was soon given governorship of Kashmir as well, and became a central figure at the Delhi court. During the later years of Muhammad Shah, he gained complete control of administration over the whole Mughal Empire. When Ahmad Shah Bahadur ascended the throne at Delhi in 1748, Safdar Jang became his Wazir-ul-Malik-i-Hindustan or Prime Minister of Hindustan. He was also made the governor of Ajmer and became the "Faujdar" of Narnaul. In 1748, Javed Khan, a rival invited the new Nizam of Hyderabad Nasir Jung, to join an alliance against the wazir. Safdar Jang requested Maratha support against Nasir Jung. Balaji Baji Rao dispatched Scindia and Holkar chiefs to prevent Nasir Jung's forces from reaching Delhi, and thus, saved Safdar Jang. In 1752, the Rohillas of the Doab region rebelled against the Mughal emperor. Safdar Jang crushed the rebellion with Maratha support. However, court politics eventually overtook him and he was dismissed in 1753. He returned to Oudh in December 1753 and selected Faizabad as his military headquarters and administrative capital. He intervened on behalf of Madho Singh of Jaipur in his conflict with Marathas and convinced the Marathas to leave with an apology and some compensation. He died in October 1754 at the age of 46 years in Sultanpur near Faizabad.

Safdar Jang had maintained a contingent of 20,000 "Mughaliya" cavalry, most of whom were Hindustani Muslims, many who were chiefly from the Jadibal district of Srinagar in Kashmir, who had imitated the Qizilbash in dress and spoke the Persian language. The state also saw a large migration of Kashmiri Shi'as to the Shi'a kingdom of Awadh, both to escape persecution and to secure courtly patronage. This was especially the case with men from the district of Jadibal in Kashmir, who were all Shias, who looked to Safdar Jang as the sword-arm of the Shi'as in India.

== Tomb ==
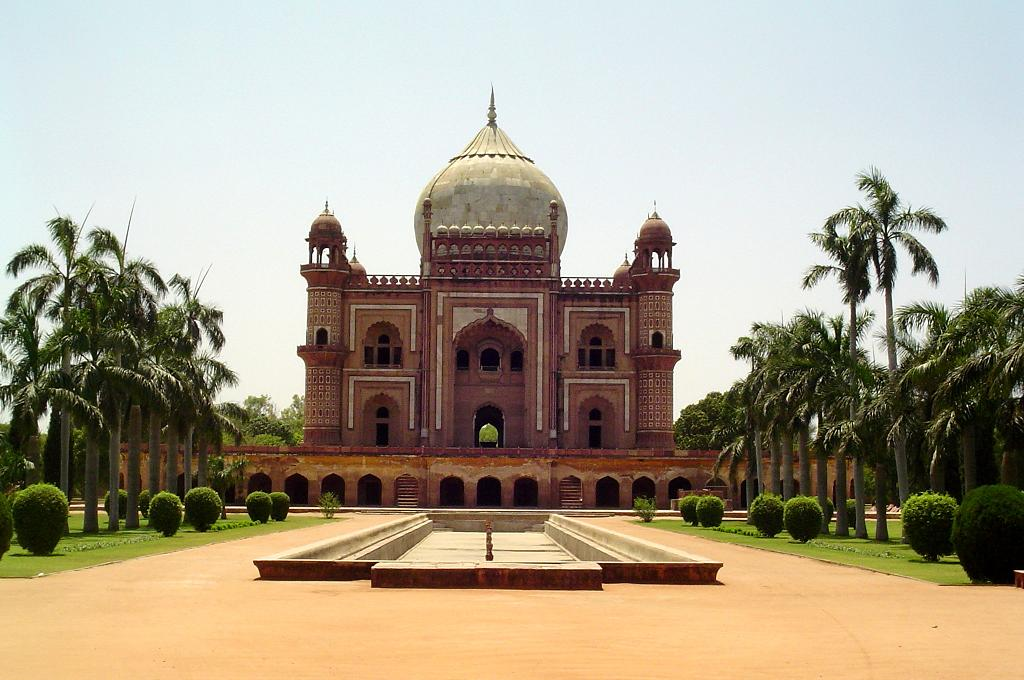
Safdar Jang's tomb in Delhi

Safdar Jang's Tomb was built in 1754 and is situated on a road now known as Safdar Jang Road, in New Delhi.

Several other modern structures near the tomb also carry his name today like Safdar Jang Airport and Safdar Jang Hospital.

== See also ==
- Safdar Jung (film)
- Safdar jung (Delhi)
- Abul-Hasan ibn Mirza Ghiyas Beg

Preceded by Burhan ul-Mulk Mir Mohammad Amin Musawi Sa`adat 'Ali Khan I	Subadar Nawab of Oudh; 1739–1748 (1st time)	Succeeded by post abolished
Preceded by new creation	Nawab Wazir al-Mamalik of Oudh; 1748–1753 (acting to 29 Jun 1748)	Succeeded by post abolished
Preceded by new creation	Subadar Nawab of Oudh; 1753–1754 (2nd time)	Succeeded by Jalal ad-Din Shoja' ad-Dowla Haydar
