= Sahiba Mahal =

Empress consort of the Mughal Empire

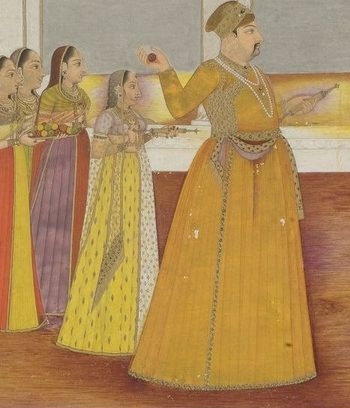
- A consort, most likely Sahiba Mahal, celebrating Holi with Muhammad Shah. By court painter Bhupal Singh ca.1737
- Died: fl. 1795; Sahiba Mahal Haveli, Delhi, India
- Burial: Muhammad Shah Mausoleum, Nizamuddin Dargah, Delhi
- Spouse: Muhammad Shah (died 1748)
- Issue: Hazrat Begum
- House: Timurid (by marriage)
- Father: Sayid Salabat Khan
- Mother: Safiya Sultan Begum
- Religion: Islam

Sahiba Mahal (Persian: صاحبہ محل; fl. 1795) was the second wife of Mughal emperor Muhammad Shah.

== Early years ==
Sahiba Mahal was the daughter of Sayid Salabat Khan (died fl. 1753), the son of Sadat Khan, a Mughal noble of Turkish origin, who had been Mir Atish (head of artillery) under emperor Farrukhsiyar. Her mother was Safiya Sultan Begum. Her aunt, Fakhr-un-Nissa Begum also known as Gauhar-un-Nissa Begum was married to Farrukhsiyar, and bore him a daughter, Badshah Begum, who became first wife of Muhammad Shah.

=== Marriage ===
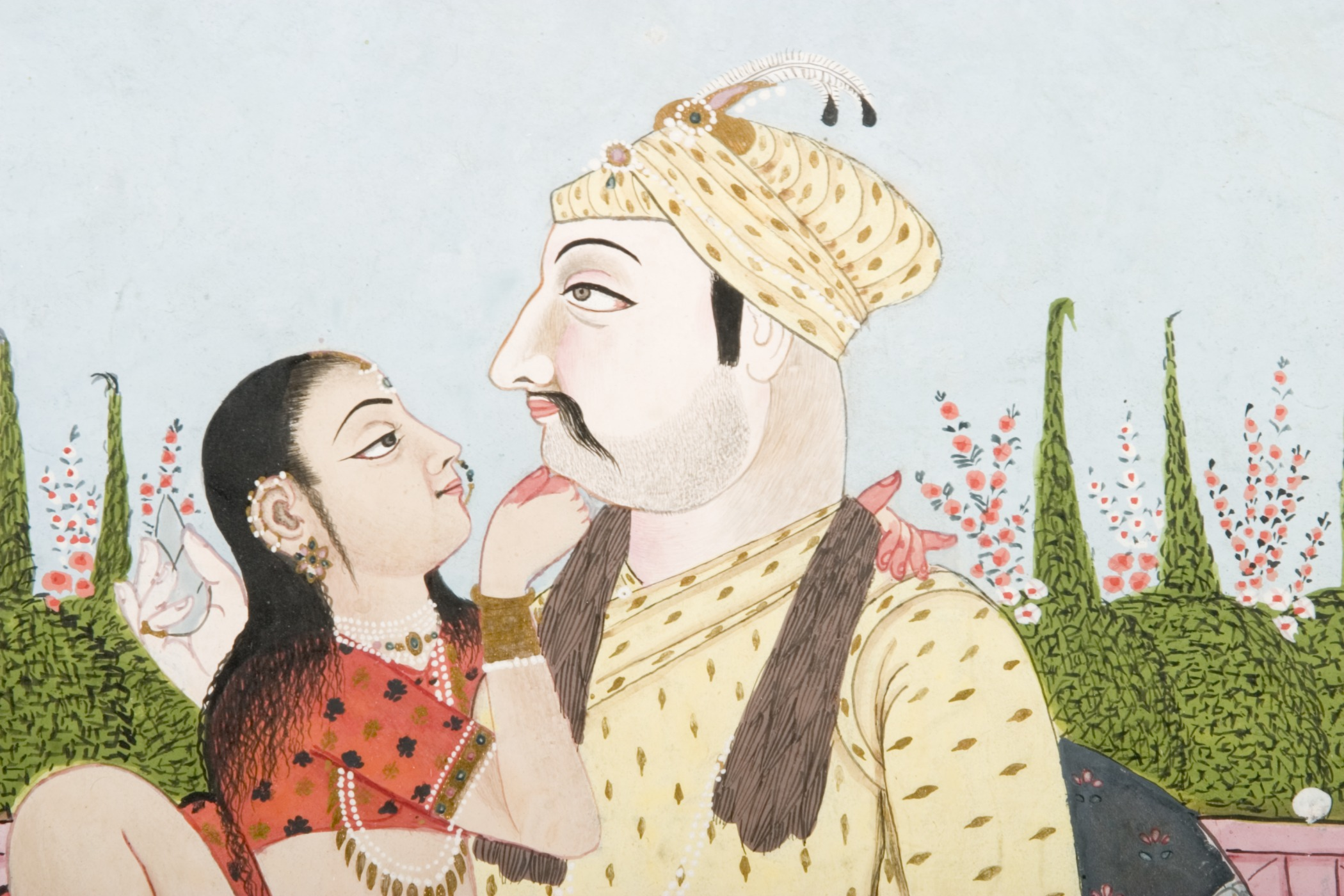
Muhammad Shah and an unidentified partner.

Sahiba Mahal married Muhammad Shah as his second wife. To commemorate her wedding to Muhammad Shah, her father was treated with special favour, and was given the rank of 4000, and the post of Bakhshi of the Ahdis. She was the mother of Muhammad Shah's only daughter, Princess Hazrat Begum, born on 3 November 1741. She and Badshah Begum, brought up Muhammad Shah's son Ahmad Shah Bahadur from the dancing girl, Qudsia Begum, as their own.

== Dowager ==
In April 1748, Muhammad Shah died. His son, Ahmad Shah Bahadur, who was in camp with Safdar Jang near Panipat to return to Delhi and claim the throne. On Safdar Jang's advice, he was enthroned at Panipat and returned to Delhi a few days later. Sahiba Mahal was ignominiously sent to the widows' house with no special provision for her comfort, and suffered much humiliation and hardship at Udham Bai's hands. She, however, remained universally honoured in Delhi society.

On 26 May 1754, Ahmad Shah was attacked on a journey by a band of Marathas under Malhar Rao Holkar. While running away from Sikandrabad, he took along with him his mother Qudsia Begum, his son Mahmud Shah Bahadur, his favourite wife Inayetpuri Bai, and Sahiba Mahal's daughter Hazrat Begum, leaving her and all other empresses and princesses at the mercy of the enemies. She, along with some other ladies were overtaken by Aqibat Mahmud Kashmiri's brother, and were conducted to the house of the qazi of the city.

In February 1756, her 16-year-old daughter, Princess Hazrat Begum, became so famous for her matchless beauty that the Mughal emperor Alamgir II, who was then about sixty, used undue pressures and threats to force Sahiba Mahal and the princess' guardian Badshah Begum, to give him Hazrat Begum's hand in marriage. The princess preferred death over marrying an old wreck of sixty and Alamgir II did not succeed in marrying her.

=== Role in Afghan invasions of Delhi ===
In April 1757, the Durrani king Ahmad Shah, after sacking the imperial capital of Delhi, desired to marry her 16-year-old daughter, Hazrat Begum. Badshah Begum again resisted handing over her tender charge to a fierce Afghan of grandfatherly age but Ahmad Shah forcibly wedded Hazrat Begum on 5 April 1757 in Delhi. After their wedding celebrations, Ahmad Shah took his young wife back to his native place of Afghanistan. The weeping bride was accompanied by Sahiba Mahal, Badshah Begum, and a few other ladies of note from the imperial harem. Sahiba Mahal expressed her desire to accompany her Durrani dynasty in-law and her Mughal royal daughter to Kandahar, seeing the decline of the Mughal dynasty in India. On 8–10 April Sahiba Mahal came from the Ahmad Shah's camp on a final visit to the city to remove her property. She was escorted by 2,000 Durrani musketeers.

In 1787, Ghulam Kadir, a leader of the Afghan Rohilla, tried to secure the support of Begum Samru, the wife of Walter Reinhardt, and ruler over the principality of Sardhana, who had considerable influence at this time in order to consolidate his position at Emperor Shah Alam II's court. Ghulam Kadir's efforts to secure her support were, however, fruitless, as the Begum rejected a proposal for an alliance. Ghulam Kadir and his Rohillas then turned away from Delhi to conquer the crownlands in the Doab. Sahiba Mahal was so much influenced that she recommended to the emperor that Begam Samru and Najaf Quli Khan should be invited to the presence in palace of Ghulam Kadir.

During the occupation of Delhi in 1788 by Ghulam Kadir, he deposed Shah Alam II on the 30 July 1788 and installed the prince Bidar Bakht as the new emperor under the regnal name Nasir-ud-din Muhammad Jahan Shah (r. 31 July 1788 – 11 October 1788). Bidar Bakht's enthronement was the result of a pact between Ghulam Kadir and Badshah Begum, who paid 12 lakhs of rupees to Ghulam Kadir to ensure her grandson's investiture. Sahiba Mahal also joined her in this project.

Sahiba Mahal and Badshah Begum were then plundered by Ghulam Kadir. The rebellious chiefs sent a party to the two of them. As they were known, not only very rich, but to possess considerable influence over the royal family. They were ordered to court and persuade the women of the royal harem to quietly deliver their jewels and valuable things. However, both of them refused compliance with the order, citing their advanced age and high rank. Ghulam Kadir then raided their palaces on 22 August, and the two were placed on a river bank.

== Last years ==
During the 1780s, she patronised Sayyid Muhammad-Mehdi al-Shahristani, the patriarch of the Al-Shahristani family, an Iraqi-Iranian clerical Shia family. Sahiba Mahal died in her haveli located near the stables of Prince Dara Shikoh, and was buried in the mausoleum of Muhammad Shah, located at Nizamuddin Dargah, Delhi.

== Sources ==
- Cheema, G. S. (2002). The Forgotten Mughals: A History of the Later Emperors of the House of Babar, 1707-1857. Manohar Publishers & Distributors. ISBN 9788173044168.
- Sarkar, Jadunath (1952). Fall of the Mughal Empire. Vol. III (2 ed.). Calcutta: M. C. Sarkar & Sons.
- Sarkar, Jadunath (1964). "Fall Of The Mughal Empire, Volume 1". Internet Archive.
