= Nur Bai =

Indian tawaif

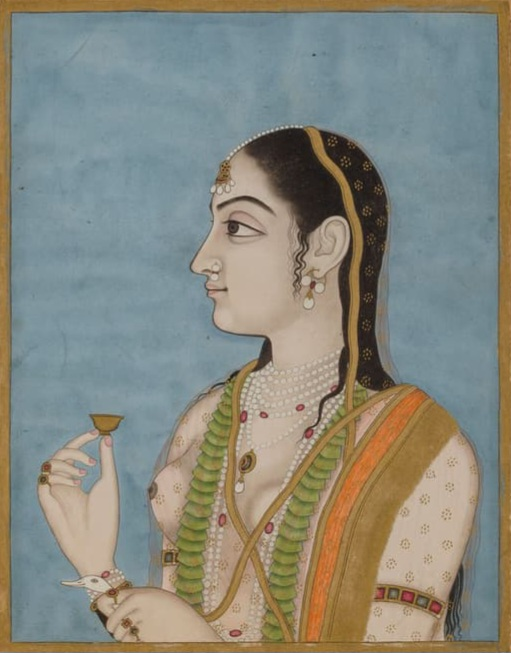
- Portrait of a tawaif of Delhi, possibly Nur Bai. ca.18th century
- Born: 18th century, Delhi, India

Nur Bai was an 18th-century Indian tawaif of Delhi and a favorite of Mughal emperor Muhammad Shah.

== Life ==
Nur Bai was either born into a tawaif family or a family of domni status. Nur Bai was one of the wealthiest tawaifs in Delhi at the time. She had her own palatial haveli located in the Chawri Bazar and would ride on elephants flanked with howdahs, accompanied by her own soldiers, macebearers, and heralds.

She was said to have been of exceedingly sophisticated bearing and having the voice of a nightingale, and was known for her skill in conversation. The nobility sought her out heavily and spared no effort to gain her favor and good graces. One such noble man was Latif Khan, who was one of Nur Bai's most frequent patrons, and was particularly generous and overbearing. She would occasionally perform at his mehfils which were attended by other high ranking nobles, and was adamant on the following of etiquette and customs to be observed by the audience.

== Mistress ==
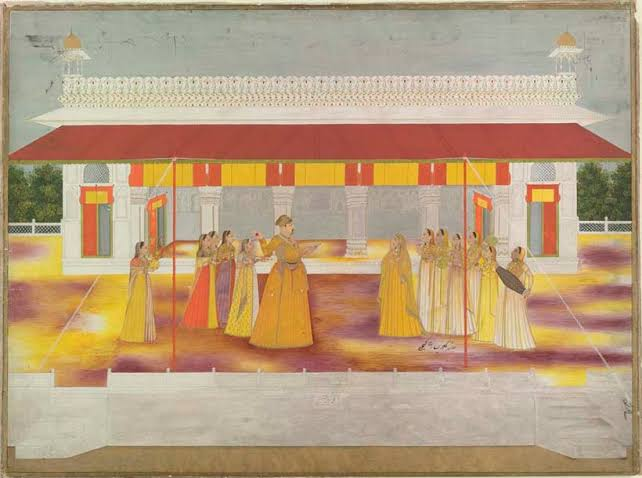
Emperor Muhammad Shah playing Holi with Gulab Bai, a prominent tawaif. (right). c.1737

The 13th Mughal emperor Muhammad Shah was a patron of the arts, and frequently enjoyed the company of tawaifs. The Empress, Qudsia Begum, who hailed from a tawaif family, wielded considerable influence in the Imperial harem. Nur Bai was among the many tawaifs that were favoured by the emperor, who was given the sobriquet of "Rangeela" (lit. The colorful) for being a patron of the arts and for his love of merrymaking.

She remained the favorite of Muhammad Shah until Munavvar Khan, the bosom companion of the emperor, fell in love and eloped with her. He was punished for the capital crime of coveting the Emperor's favorite and it was with much difficulty that he was persuaded to spare his life.

== Role during the sack of Delhi ==
In May 1738, Nader Shah, the founder of the Afsharid Dynasty started a campaign in northern India and sacked the city of Delhi. In March 1739 he married his son, Nasrollah Mirza to Iffat-un-Nissa Begum, a princess of the Mughal dynasty and a niece of Emperor Muhammad Shah.. It was during this time that Nur Bai had caught the eye of the Shah, who instantly became enamored with her. He promised to take her back with him to Persia, with the offer of 4500 rupees. However, Nur Bai refused.

=== Legend ===
A month later after the occasion of the wedding of his son to Muhammad Shah's niece, Nader Shah held durbar in the Mughal court and promised Muhammad Shah to send forces from Kandahar if he ever needed help warring against the Marathas or any other threats, and placed the crown of Hindustan back on his head, reinstating him as emperor. It was during this instance of swapping turbans that, according to legend, Nader Shah had taken the Koh-I-Noor hidden within the turban of the emperor; the whereabouts of which were disclosed to him by Nur Bai. However, the legend only shows up in records of the 19th century, evidence that it is most likely nothing more than a myth.
