= Umdat-Ul-Mulk, Amir Khan =

Nobleman of the Mughal Empire (died 1746)

Amir Khan II Mir Ishaq
- Umdat al Mulk, Aziz Ullah Khan, Amir Khan II Mir Ishaq
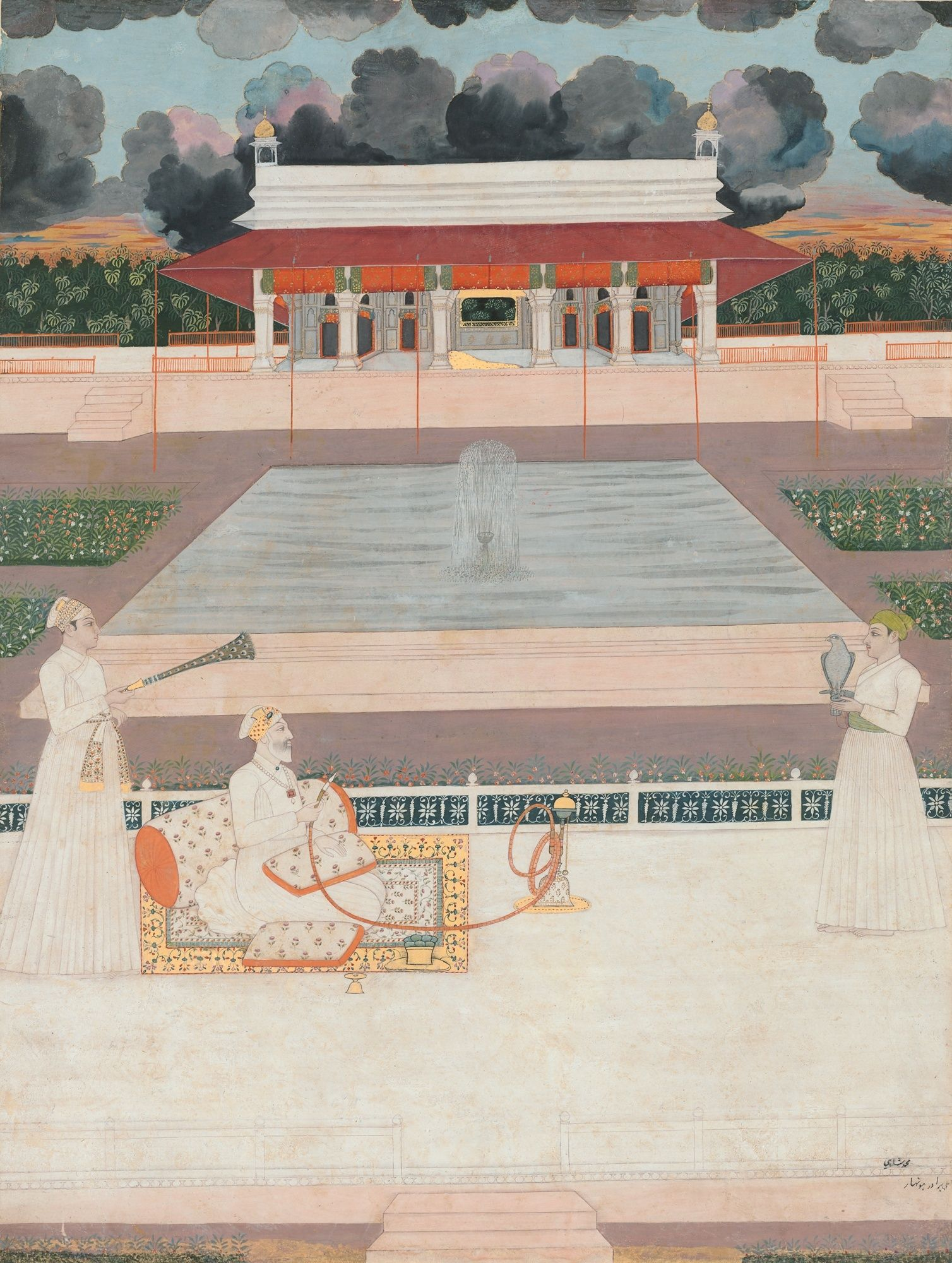
- Umdat al Mulk reclining on cushions while being attended to by servants.

Nawab of Allahabad
- Reign: 1739-1744
- Issue: Khadija Khanum
- Father: Amir Khan Mir Miran
- Military career
- Allegiance: Mughal Empire
- Rank: Sowar, Faujdar, Subadar
- Conflicts: Battle of Agra and Invasion of Rohilkhand

Umdat ul Mulk, Amir Khan Mir Ishaq (died 25 September 1746) was a nobleman of the Mughal Empire. He was a son of Amir Khan Mir Miran and initially held the title of Aziz Ullah Khan.

== Biography ==
He gained prominence in the service of the Emperor Furrukhsiyar, when sided with that emperor in the civil war against the Emperor Jahandar Shah. After the former's victory he was appointed as Qurbegi (Head of Artillery) and Superintendent of the Tosh-Khana (Royal Stores).

He was a close aid of the Sayyid Brothers and after the departure of Amir ul Umar Hussain Ali Khan for the Deccan, he left with the elder brother Qutb al Mulk, Abdullah Khan for Delhi (then known as Shahjahanabad). On the assassination of Amir al Umara by the Turani faction, he remained loyal to Qutb al Mulk and Sultan Ibrahim and led the vanguard during the Battle of Agra. During the subsequent capture of Qutb al Mulk and the fall of the Sayyid Brothers. He fled to a garden and later on hearing the whereabouts of Sultan Ibrahim. He enticed the Sultan to the garden and gave information to Muhammad Shah, for which he was amply rewarded, being appointed to the position of Third Bakhshi (Mughal Pay-Master).

The Emperor Muhammad Shah was well disposed towards him, in large part due to his eloquent speech. Moreover, the Emperor was grateful to him, as his daughter Khadija introduced the Emperor to his future wife Udham Bai. He was eventually entitled as "Umdat al Mulk" by the same emperor. The resulting jealousy of other nobles and their machinations led to his appointment as Nawab of Allahabad. This was done to distance him from court where beforehand he had been present in almost every assembly. He returned to court and received further favours, especially due to his close friendship with Safdar Jang, that latter helped in his appointment as superintendent of Artillery.

He along with Safdar Jang took the Mughal Emperor Muhammad Shah on an expedition against Rohilkhand and the person of Ali Mohammad who had aroused the enmity of Safdar Jang, but the intervention of Itimad ad Daula, Qamarudin Khan largely left the expedition a failure.

== Death ==
It was widely believed that the Emperor would elevate him to the rank of Wazir, so upon his summon to court, as he reached the door of the Diwan e Khas he was fatally stabbed by a new attendant. He died on 25 September 1746.
