= Hazrat Begum =

- Shahzadi of the Mughal Empire
- Born: c. 1740; Delhi, Delhi Subah, Mughal Empire (modern day India)
- Spouse: Ahmad Shah Durrani (m. 1757; d. 1772)
- House: Timurid (by birth); Durrani (by marriage)
- Father: Muhammad Shah
- Mother: Sahiba Mahal
- Religion: Islam

Hazrat Begum (Persian: حضرت بیگم; Pashto: حضرت بېګم; born c. 1740), also known as Hazrat Mahal and Sahiba Begum, was a Mughal princess, as the daughter of Mughal Emperor Muhammad Shah. She was a wife of Ahmad Shah Durrani, the first emir of the Durrani Empire.

== Life ==
Hazrat Begum was born a Mughal princess and was the daughter of Mughal emperor Muhammad Shah and his wife Sahiba Mahal. The princess was raised by her mother and the emperor's first consort Badshah Begum, who was Sahiba Mahal's closest companian in the harem. In April 1748, her father died, and her brother, Ahmad Shah Bahadur, ascended the throne. His mother, Qudsia Begum, gave pension to the Begums and the children of the late emperor not only from the government's purse but also from her own funds.

On 26 May 1754, Ahmad Shah was attacked on a journey by a band of Marathas under Malhar Rao Holkar. While running away from Sikandrabad, he took along with him Hazrat Begum, his mother Qudsia Begum, his son Mahmud Shah Bahadur, and his favourite wife Inayetpuri Bai, leaving all other empresses and princesses at the mercy of the enemies.

At the age of sixteen in February 1756, she became so famous for her matchless beauty that the Mughal emperor Alamgir II, who was then about sixty, used pressure and threats to force Sahiba Mahal and the princess' guardian and step-mother, Badshah Begum, to give him Hazrat Begum's hand in marriage. The princess preferred death over marrying an old wreck of sixty and Alamgir II did not succeed in marrying her.

In April 1757, after sacking the imperial capital of Delhi, the Durrani king Ahmed Shah Abdali desired to marry the deceased Emperor Muhammad Shah's 16-year-old daughter. As she was only 16 years old, Badshah Begum again resisted handing over her tender charge to an Afghan king 35 years old, but Shah forcibly wedded her on 5 April 1757 in Delhi. After the wedding celebrations, Ahmad Shah took his young wife back to his native place of Afghanistan. The weeping bride was accompanied by Badshah Begum, Sahiba Mahal and a few ladies of note from the imperial Mughal harem.

== Ancestry ==
Ancestors of Hazrat Begum

16. Muhi-ud-din Muhammad Aurangzeb, Mughal Emperor
8. Qutb-ud-din Muhammad Bahadur Shah I, Mughal Emperor
17. Nawab Bai of Rajauri
4. Shahzada Jahan Shah
9. Dilruba
2. Muhammad Shah, Mughal Emperor
5. Fakhr-un-nissa Begum
1. Hazrat Begum
24. Sayyid Hussain Marashi
12. Nawab Sa'adat Khan Zulfiqar Jang
6. Sayid Salabat Khan
3. Sahiba Mahal
7. Safa Begum

== See also ==
- Mughal Empire
