= Qudsia Begum =

Empress Consort of India (fl. 1768)

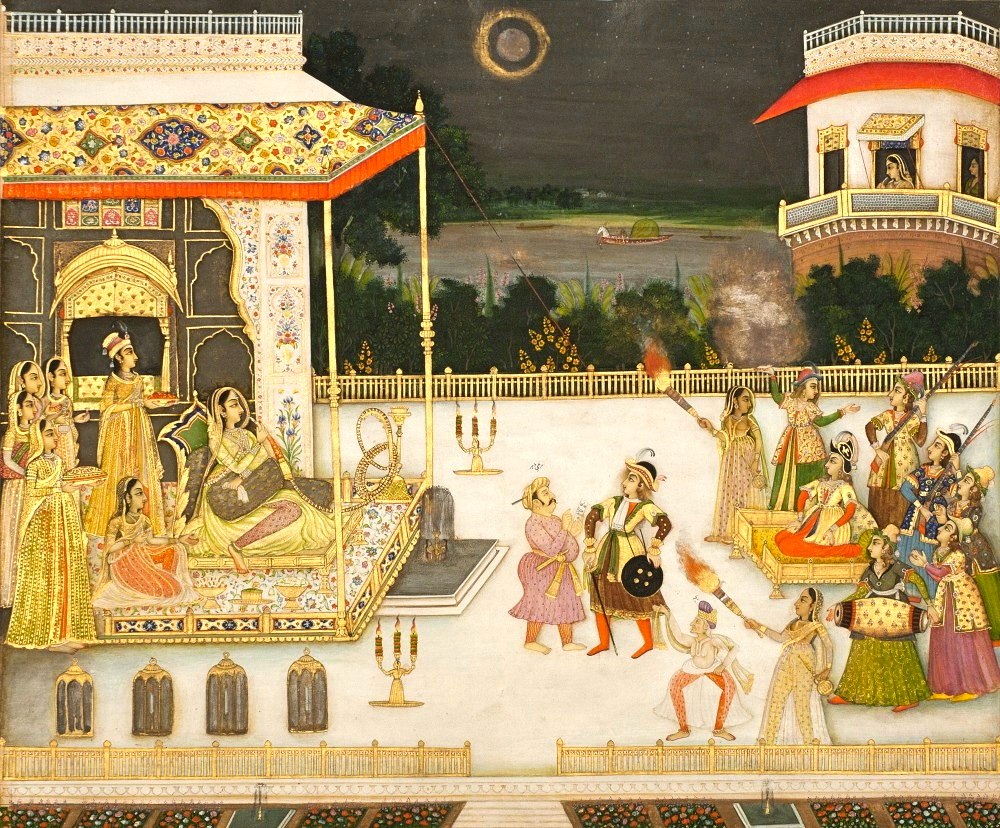
- Miniature painting showing Qudsiya Begum being entertained with fireworks and dance (1742 CE by Mir Miran)
- Died: fl. 1768; Delhi, Mughal Empire
- Spouse: Muhammad Shah
- Issue: Ahmad Shah Bahadur
- House: Timurid (by marriage)

Qudsia Begum (died fl. 1768) was a wife of Mughal emperor Muhammad Shah and mother of emperor Ahmad Shah Bahadur. She was appointed an administrator early on and served as de facto regent from 1748 to 1754.

== Early years ==
Qudsia Begum was born Udham Bai and came from humble origins, hailing from a tawaif family; in her early years, she also pursued the same profession. She had a brother named Man Khan. She was introduced to Muhammad Shah's attention by Khadija Khanum, the daughter of Umdat-Ul-Mulk, Amir Khan while she was still a dancing girl. The emperor was so fascinated by her, that he raised her to the dignity of an empress.

She gave birth to Muhammad Shah's only surviving son, Ahmad Shah Bahadur on 23 December 1725. Her son was, however, brought up by Muhammad Shah's empresses Badshah Begum and Sahiba Mahal.

== Empress dowager ==
In April 1748, Muhammad Shah died. Her son, Ahmad Shah Bahadur, who was in camp with Safdar Jang near Panipat to return to Delhi and claim the throne. On Safdar Jang's advice, he was enthroned at Panipat and returned to Delhi a few days later. Ahmad Shah Bahadur proved to be an ineffective ruler and was strongly influenced by his mother. A series of defeats and internal struggles led to his downfall.

She was successively given the titles of Bai-Ju Sahiba, Nawab Qudsiya, Sahiba-uz-Zamani, Sahibjiu Sahiba, Hazrat Qibla-i-Alam, and Mumtaz Mahal. She was known for her generosity. She gave pension to the Begums and the children of the late emperor not only from the government's purse but also from her own funds. She, however, behaved ruthlessly with Badshah Begum and Sahiba Mahal.

Imperial officials used to sit down at her porch daily and she would hold discussions with them from behind a screen or through the medium of eunuchs. There, officials passed her petitions of the state in envelopes, and eunuchs read them aloud for the Begum to listen and deliver her approvals and judgments and she would pass orders on them without consulting anyone. At the zenith of her power, she displayed levels of magnanimity and charity unheard of in those times. Any person who could manage to get his or her case heard by her was sure to get some benefit or help. A court historian once lamented, "Oh God! That the affairs of Hindustan should be conducted by a woman as foolish as this!"

She had an affair with the eunuch Javed Khan Nawab Bahadur. He had been an assistant controller of the harem servants and manager of the Begums' estates during the late reign. Javed Khan was assassinated by Safdar Jang on 27 August 1752. She and her son grieved him deeply. It is said that she put on white robes and discarded her jewels and ornaments like a widow.

The mansab of commanding 50,000 horse was conferred upon her, and her birthday was celebrated with greater pomp than that of the Emperor Ahmad Shah Bahadur himself. Her brother, Man Khan, a vagabond haunting the lanes and occasionally following the profession of a male dancer in a supporting role for singing girls, was created a mansabdar of 6,000 with the title of Mutaqad-ud-Daulah Bahadur. At a time when the soldiers were mutinying nearly every day due to overdue payments and the Mughal court could not raise even two hundred thousand rupees for this purpose, Qudsia Begum spent two crore rupees in celebrating her birthday on 21 January 1754.

== Defeat and imprisonment ==
On 26 May 1754, Ahmad Shah Bahadur, camped with his army in Sikandrabad was defeated by a Maratha force led by Malhar Rao Holkar and the former Mughal Grand Vizier Imad-ul-Mulk. The emperor fled to Delhi with Qudsia Begum, his son Mahmud Shah Bahadur, his favourite wife Banu Begum Sahiba, and his half-sister Hazrat Begum, leaving behind other wives and a retinue of 8,000 women.

Imad-ul-Mulk and Maratha chieftain Raghunath Rao followed the emperor to Delhi. Ahmad Shah Bahadur was deposed on 2 June 1754 and arrested with his mother. Imad-ul-Mulk was reinstated himself as the Mughal Grand Vizier and dispatched a Mughal army to capture Bhurtpore, which was then controlled by Suraj Mal. Imad-ul-Mulk intercepted letters from Ahmad Shah Bahadur to Suraj Mal, claiming to encourage the Jats to fight in exchange for aid. Imad-ul-Mulk made peace with Suraj Mal, returned to Delhi, and had Ahmad Shah Bahadur and Qudsia Begum blinded.

== Legacy ==
Qudsia Begum commissioned various public and private works in Delhi. The Sunehri Masjid near the Red Fort was constructed between 1747 and 1751 for Nawab Bahadur Javid Khan. In 1748, emperor Ahmad Shah Bahadur commissioned a garden, known as Qudsia Bagh for her. It consisted of a stone barahdari and a mosque inside it.

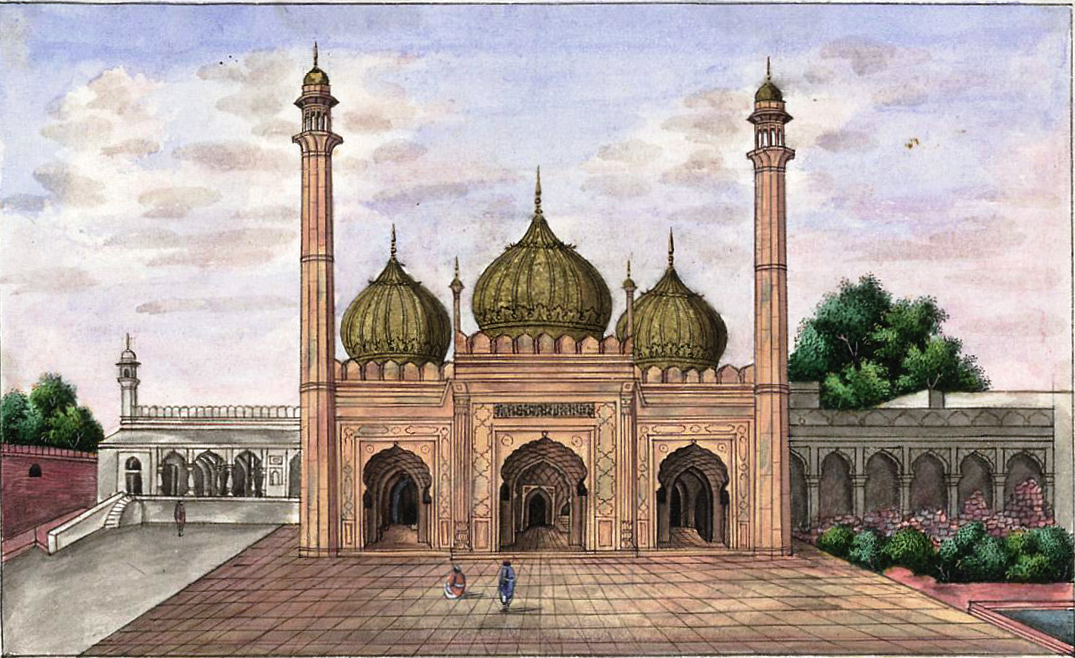
The Golden Mosque near the Red Fort, which she commissioned in 1747

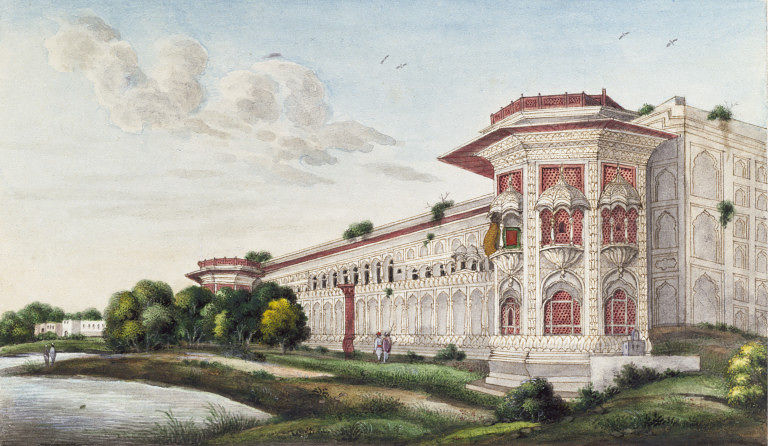
Her palace on the banks of the river Yamuna was commissioned in 1748

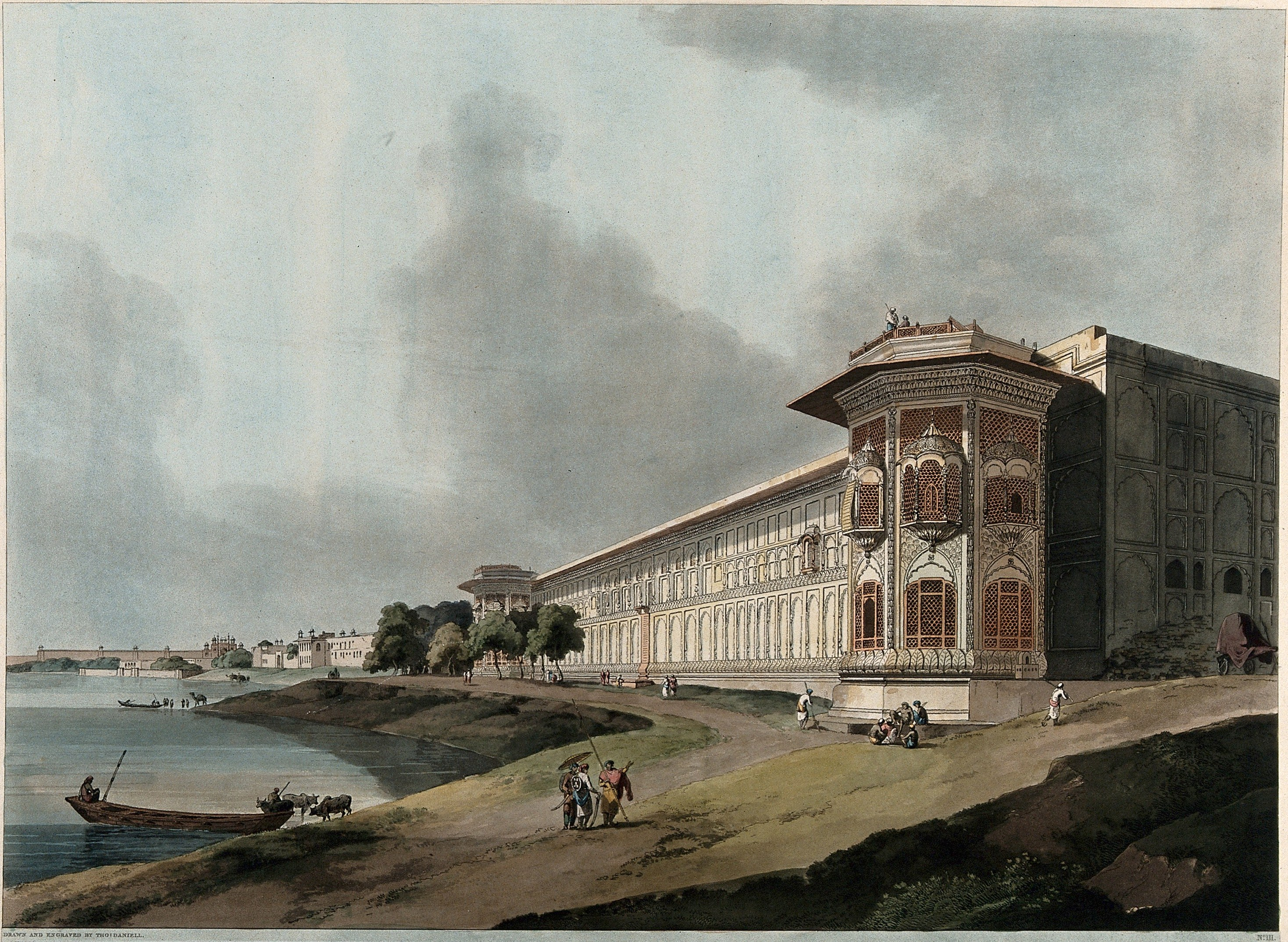
Qudsia Bagh, 1795

== Sources ==
- Sarkar, Jadunath (1932). "Fall Of The Mughal Empire, Volume 1, 1739-1754". Internet Archive.
- Sarkar, Jadunath (1964). "Fall Of The Mughal Empire, Volume 1". Internet Archive.
- Sharma, Sudha (21 March 2016). The Status of Muslim Women in Medieval India. SAGE Publications India. ISBN 9789351505679.
