= Badshah Begum =

Padshah Begum of the Mughal Empire from 1721 to 1748

- Shahzadi of the Mughal Empire; Empress consort of the Mughal Empire; Zan-i-Kalan; Malika-uz-Zamani
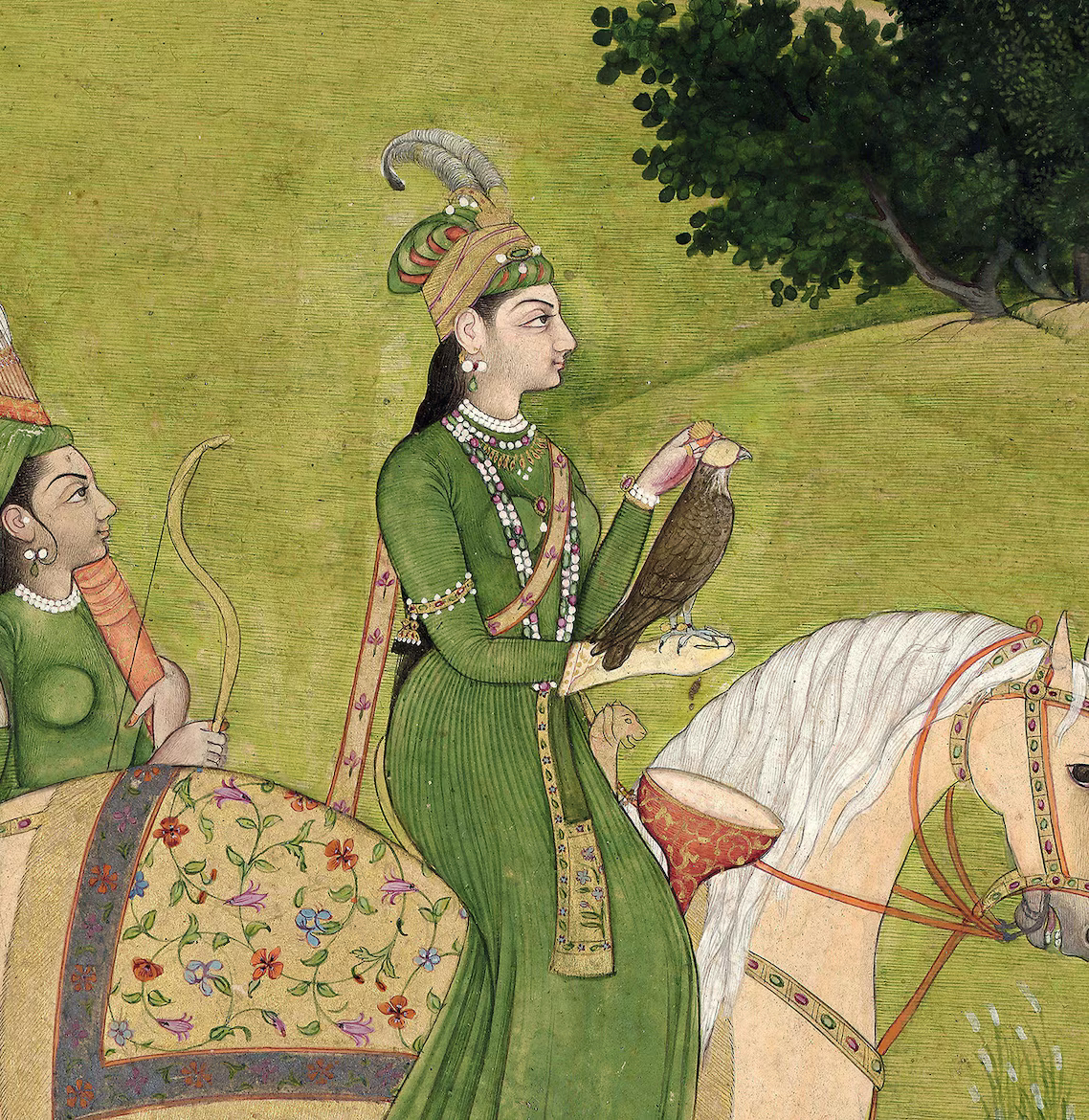
- Possible depiction of Bahshah Begum from a painting attributed to Nainsukh, c. 1735–40

Padshah Begum
- Tenure: 8 December 1721 – 26 April 1748
- Predecessor: Zinat-un-Nissa
- Successor: Zeenat Mahal
- Born: c. 1703
- Died: 14 December 1789 (aged 85–86); Delhi, India
- Burial: Tis Hazari Bagh, Delhi
- Spouse: Muhammad Shah (m. 1721; died 1748)
- Issue: Shahriyar Shah Bahadur
- House: Timurid (by birth)
- Father: Farrukhsiyar
- Mother: Gauhar-un-Nissa Begum
- Religion: Islam

Badshah Begum (c. 1703 – 14 December 1789) was the first wife and chief consort of the Mughal emperor Muhammad Shah. She is popularly known by her title Malika-uz-Zamani ("Queen of the Age") which was conferred upon her by her husband, immediately after their marriage.

Badshah Begum was a second-cousin of her husband and was a Mughal princess by birth. She was the daughter of Mughal emperor Farrukhsiyar and his first wife, Gauhar-un-Nissa Begum. She wielded major political influence in the Mughal court during her husband's reign and was his most influential wife. It was through her efforts that her step-son, Ahmad Shah Bahadur, was able to ascend the Mughal throne.

== Family and lineage ==
Badshah Begum was born c.1703, during the reign of her great-great-grandfather Aurangzeb. She was the daughter of the later Mughal emperor Farrukhsiyar and his first wife, Gauhar-un-Nissa Begum. Farrukhsiyar was the second son of Prince Azim-ush-Shan born to his wife Sahiba Niswan Begum. Azim-ush-Shan was himself the second son of the seventh Mughal emperor Bahadur Shah I.

Badshah Begum's mother, Gauhar-un-Nissa Begum (also known as Fakhr-un-Nissa Begum), was the daughter of Sadat Khan, a Mughal noble of Turkish origin, who had been Mir Atish (head of artillery) under Farrukhsiyar. Being a Mughal princess, Badshah Begum was well educated, intelligent and had been instructed in the nuances of ruling and diplomacy.

At the age of ten, she played a significant role in the accession of her father Farrukhsiyar, to the Mughal throne. In his chronicle Siyar-ul-Mutakhkherin, the 18th-century historian Ghulam Husain Khan recounts how she secured the vital early backing of Hussain Ali Khan Barha, a decisive factor in the succession struggle. Sitting on the Hussain's lap as a young child, she reminded him of his political debt to her grandfather, Azim-ush-shan, and earnestly urged him to support her father's cause: "It is true you are of the race of God's messenger, and you descend in a direct line from the holy Ali; moreover, you enjoy all the advantages which power and a high character can confer, but yet it cannot be denied that it is to Azim-ush-shan's favour that you owe your present station. If, then, you make use of this power in aid of my father, and render him those services which may be expected from your illustrious birth and your high character, you will prove yourself worthy of the distinctions of my grandfather Aurengzib. Whatever be our destiny, beware of what the world shall say of you."

== Marriage ==
Muhammad Shah acceded to throne in 1719 and was a son of Prince Jahan Shah, the youngest son of Emperor Bahadur Shah I and the younger half-brother of Emperor Farrukhsiyar's father, Prince Azim-ush-Shan. Badshah Begum was therefore a second cousin of her husband through her father. She married Muhammad Shah on 8 December 1721 in Delhi. The marriage was celebrated with great splendour. Accordingly, many of the officers presented lakhs of rupees, and everyone received a dress of honour, jewels, and an increase in pay. Upon her marriage, Badshah Begum was given the title of Malika-uz-Zamani ("Queen of the Age") by which she is popularly known, and further, the exalted title of Padshah Begum. Badshah Begum bore her husband his first son, Shahriyar Shah Bahadur, who died in his childhood. After that, she remained childless.

=== Consort ===
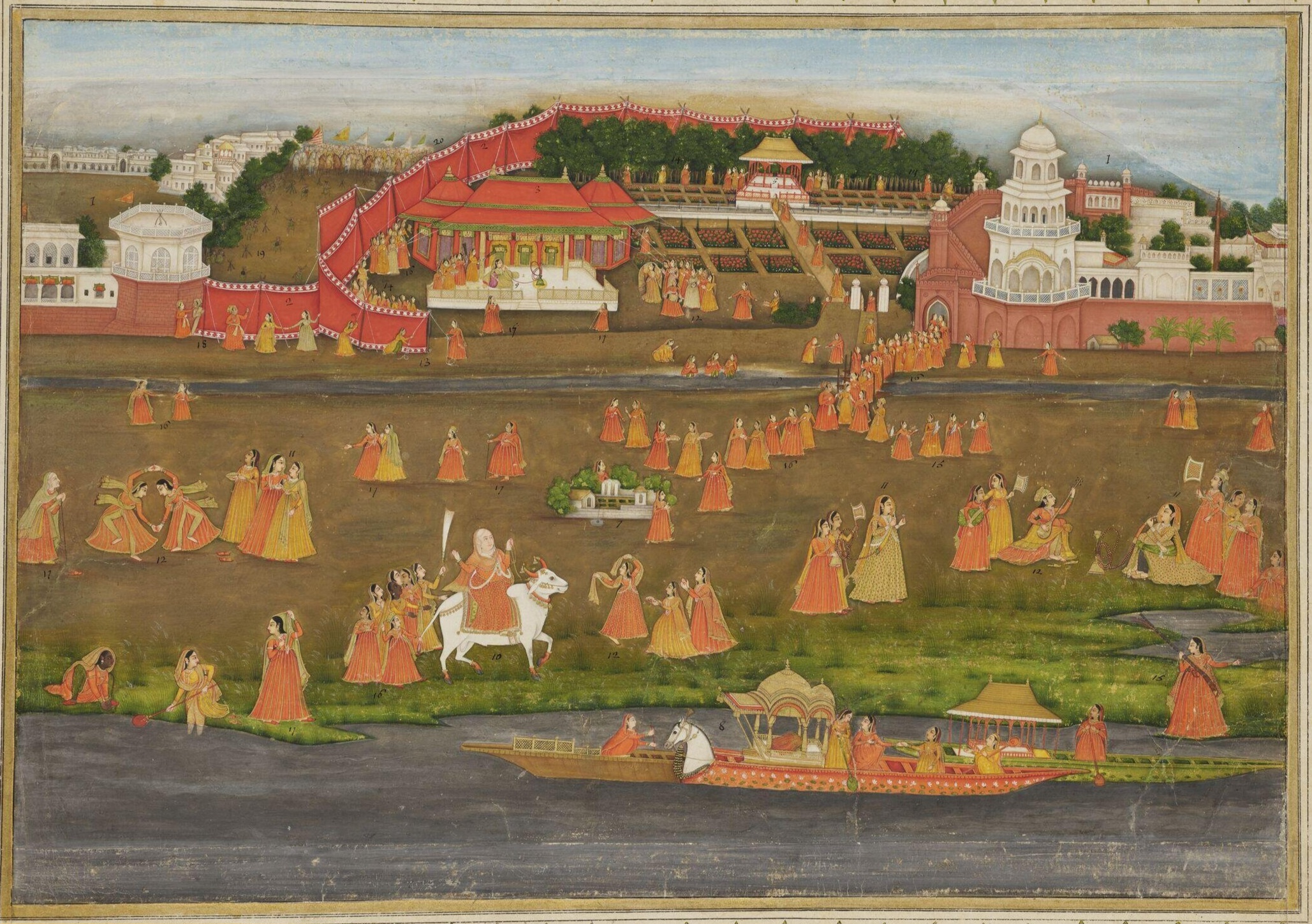
Ladies of the harem setting up encampments, c.1730-1740. Behind the Emperor's mother who is riding upon a bullock, Badshah Begum is seen reclining and smoking a huqqah.

Badshah Begum took an interest in several aspects of the state and governance and played an active part in matters of importance. Being the Emperor's chief wife, she was the most influential among all of his wives and exercised influence over him. Muhammad Shah later developed a passion for a dancing girl, Udham Bai, a woman of no refinement, and made her a wife of his, though Badshah Begum remained his favourite. The marriage with Udham Bai resulted in the birth of a son, Ahmad Shah Bahadur. This son was brought up by Badshah Begum as though he were her own son. She loved him greatly, and he grew up to ascend the throne due to her efforts. Later, Badshah Begum also brought up Ahmad Shah's daughter, Muhtaram-un-Nisa.

Badshah Begum commissioned elegant mansions in Jammu and, in typical Mughal style, laid the foundations of pleasure gardens on the banks of the Tawi River.

== Dowager ==
In April 1748, Muhammad Shah died. Badshah Begum, concealing the news of his death, sent messages to her step-son Ahmad Shah Bahadur, who was in camp with Safdar Jang near Panipat to return to Delhi and claim the throne. On Safdar Jang's advice, he was enthroned at Panipat and returned to Delhi a few days later. Badshah Begum was greatly respected by the court and the people as a Dowager, even after the Emperor's death.

In February 1756, Badshah Begum's 16-year-old step-daughter, Princess Hazrat Begum, became so famous for her matchless beauty that the Mughal emperor Alamgir II, who was then about sixty, used undue pressure and threats to force the girl's mother, Sahiba Mahal, and her guardian, Badshah Begum, to give him Hazrat Begum's hand in marriage. The princess made it clear that she preferred death to marrying an old man, and Alamgir II ultimately failed to win her.

=== Role in Afghan invasions of Delhi ===
In April 1757, the Durrani king Ahmed Shah Abdali, after sacking the imperial capital of Delhi, desired to marry Princess Hazrat Begum. Badshah Begum again resisted handing over her tender charge to a fierce Afghan of "grandfatherly age", (Note: Writer's mistake of Jadunath Sarkar, Ahmad Shah was 35 years old.) but Ahmad Shah forcibly wedded Hazrat Begum on 5 April 1757 in Delhi. After their wedding celebrations, Ahmad Shah took his young wife back to his native country of Afghanistan. The weeping bride was accompanied by her mother, Sahiba Mahal, and by her step-mother, Badshah Begum, along with a few other ladies of note from the imperial harem.

During Ghulam Kadir's two-month occupation of Delhi, from 18 July to 2 October 1788, emperor Shah Alam II was deposed on 30 July 1788 and blinded ten days later. Prince Bidar Bakht, the son of emperor Ahmad Shah Bahadur, was released from the imperial prison and made a puppet emperor with the regnal name Nasir-ud-din Muhammad Jahan Shah. Bidar Bakht was the step-son of Badshah Begum, who wanted to see Shah Alam deposed because his father Alamgir II had blinded and killed her step-son Ahmad Shah Bahadur to seize the throne in 1754. Bidar Bakht's enthronement was secured through a payment of 12 lakhs of rupees to Ghulam Kadir.

Ghulam Kadir tortured the Mughal royal family, and it is said that 21 princes and princesses were killed. The dishonouring behaviour towards the women of the imperial family is noted as especially cruel in the eyes of its time. Even Badshah Begum's fate turned as her palace was raided and she was placed on a river bank.

The Mughal royal family were freed from captivity by the Maratha armies led by Mahadji Shinde which captured Delhi after defeating Ghulam Qadir and his army. On 16 October 1788, the now blind Shah Alam II was reinstated as Mughal emperor under Maratha suzerainty and on 17 October 1788 khutbah was read in his name. His formal coronation happened on 7 February 1789.

== Death ==
Badshah Begum died in 1789 in Delhi and was buried in the Tis Hazari Bagh (Garden of Thirty Thousand). The garden had been commissioned by the Mughal emperor Shah Jahan during his reign. Emperor Aurangzeb's daughter, Princess Zeenat-un-Nissa, had also been buried in the Tis Hazari Bagh upon her death in 1721.

== Ancestry ==
Ancestors of Badshah Begum

16. Muhi-ud-din Muhammad Aurangzeb, Mughal Emperor
8. Qutb-ud-din Muhammad Bahadur Shah I, Mughal Emperor
17. Nawab Bai of Rajauri
4. Shahzada Azim-ush-Shan
18. Rup Singh, Raja of Kishangarh
9. Amrita Bai
2. Muin-ud-din Muhammad Shah Farrukhsiyar, Mughal Emperor
5. Sahiba Nizwan
1. Badshah Begum
12. Sayyid Hussain Marashi
6. Nawab Sa'adat Khan Zulfiqar Jang
3. Gauhar un-nisa Begum
28. Mirza Badi-uz-Zaman Safawi
14. Mirza Masum Khan Safawi
29. Nauras Banu Begum
7. Gauhar un-nisa Begum

== See also ==
- Mughal Empire
- Muhammad Shah
- Padshah Begum
