= Muhammad Shah =

Mughal emperor from 1719 to 1748

Muhammad Shah محمد شاه
- Padishah; Al-Sultan Al-Azam; Rangeela
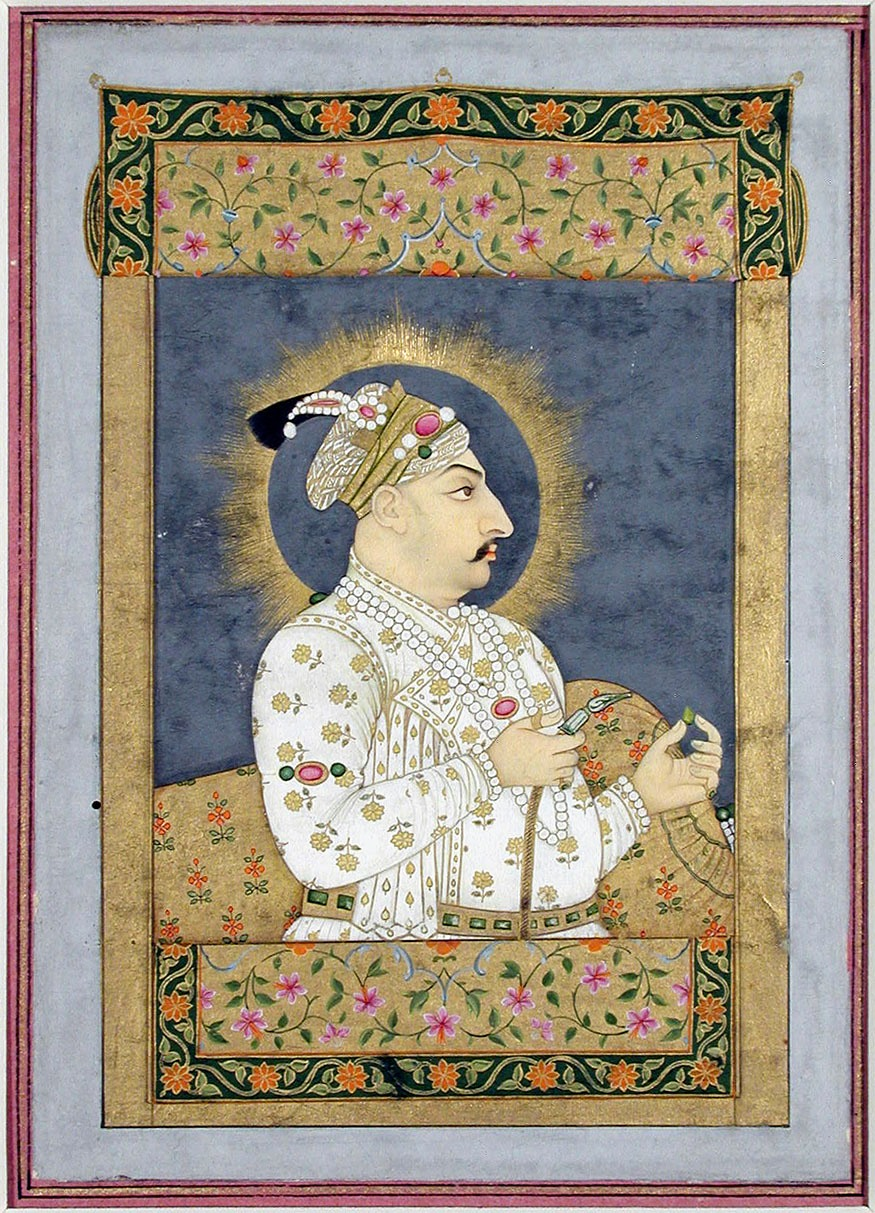
- Emperor Muhammad Shah holding an emerald and a mouthpiece of a huqqa, by Nidha Mal, c. 1730

Mughal Emperor
- Reign: 27 September 1719 – 26 April 1748
- Coronation: 29 September 1719
- Predecessor: Shah Jahan II; Jahangir II (titular)
- Successor: Ahmad Shah Bahadur
- Wazirs: Abdullah Khan II (1719–1720); Muhammad Amin Khan Turani (1720–1721); Nizam-ul-Mulk, Asaf Jah I (1721–1724); Itimad-ud-Daulah, Qamar-ud-Din Khan (1724–1748)
- Born: Roshan Akhtar; 7 August 1702; Ghazni, Kabul Subah, Mughal Empire
- Died: 26 April 1748 (aged 45); Delhi, Mughal Empire
- Burial: Mausoleum of Muhammad Shah, Nizamuddin Dargah, Delhi, India
- Consort: Badshah Begum (m. 1721)
- Wives: Sahiba Mahal; Qudsia Begum; Fatehpuri Mahal; Roshanabadi Mahal; Rup Bai
- Issue: Ahmad Shah Bahadur; Taj Mahmud Mirza; Shaharyar Mirza; Hazrat Begum
Names
- Mirza Nasir-ud-Din Muḥammad Shah Bahadur Ghazi
Regnal name
- Muhammad Shah
- House: Mughal dynasty
- Dynasty: Timurid dynasty
- Father: Jahan Shah
- Mother: Fakhr-un-Nissa Begum
- Religion: Sunni Islam (Hanafi)
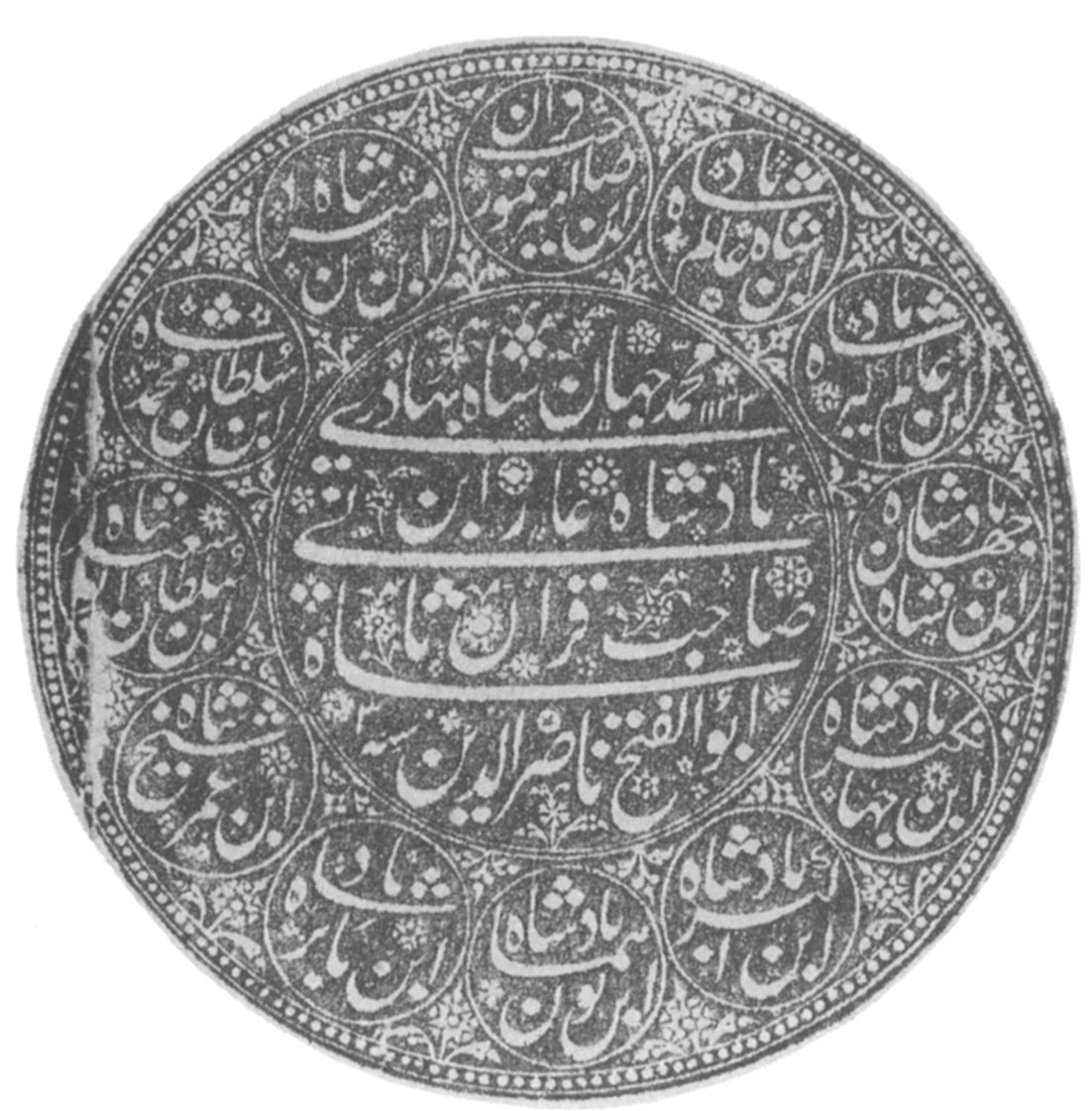
- Seal

Mirza Nasir-ud-Din Muḥammad Shah (born Roshan Akhtar; 7 August 1702 – 26 April 1748) was the thirteenth Mughal emperor from 1719 to 1748. He was son of Khujista Akhtar, the fourth son of Bahadur Shah I. After being chosen by the Sayyid Brothers of Barha, he ascended the throne at the young age of 18, under their strict supervision.

He later got rid of them with the help of Nizam-ul-Mulk, Asaf Jah I – Syed Hussain Ali Khan was murdered at Fatehpur Sikri in 1720 and Sayyid Hassan Ali Khan Barha was captured in battle in 1720 and fatally poisoned in 1722. Muhammad Shah was a great patron of the arts, including musical, cultural and administrative developments, he is thus often referred to as Muhammad Shah Rangila (lit. 'Muhammad Shah "the colourful"'). His pen-name was "Sadrang" and he is also sometimes referred to as "Bahadur Shah Rangila" after his grand father Bahadur Shah I.

Muhammad Shah's reign was marked by the rapid and irreversible decline of the Mughal Empire that was exacerbated by Nader Shah's invasion of India and the sacking of Delhi in 1739. This course of events not only shocked and mortified the Mughals themselves, but also other foreign powers, including the British.

== Early reign ==
=== Removing the Sayyid Brothers ===
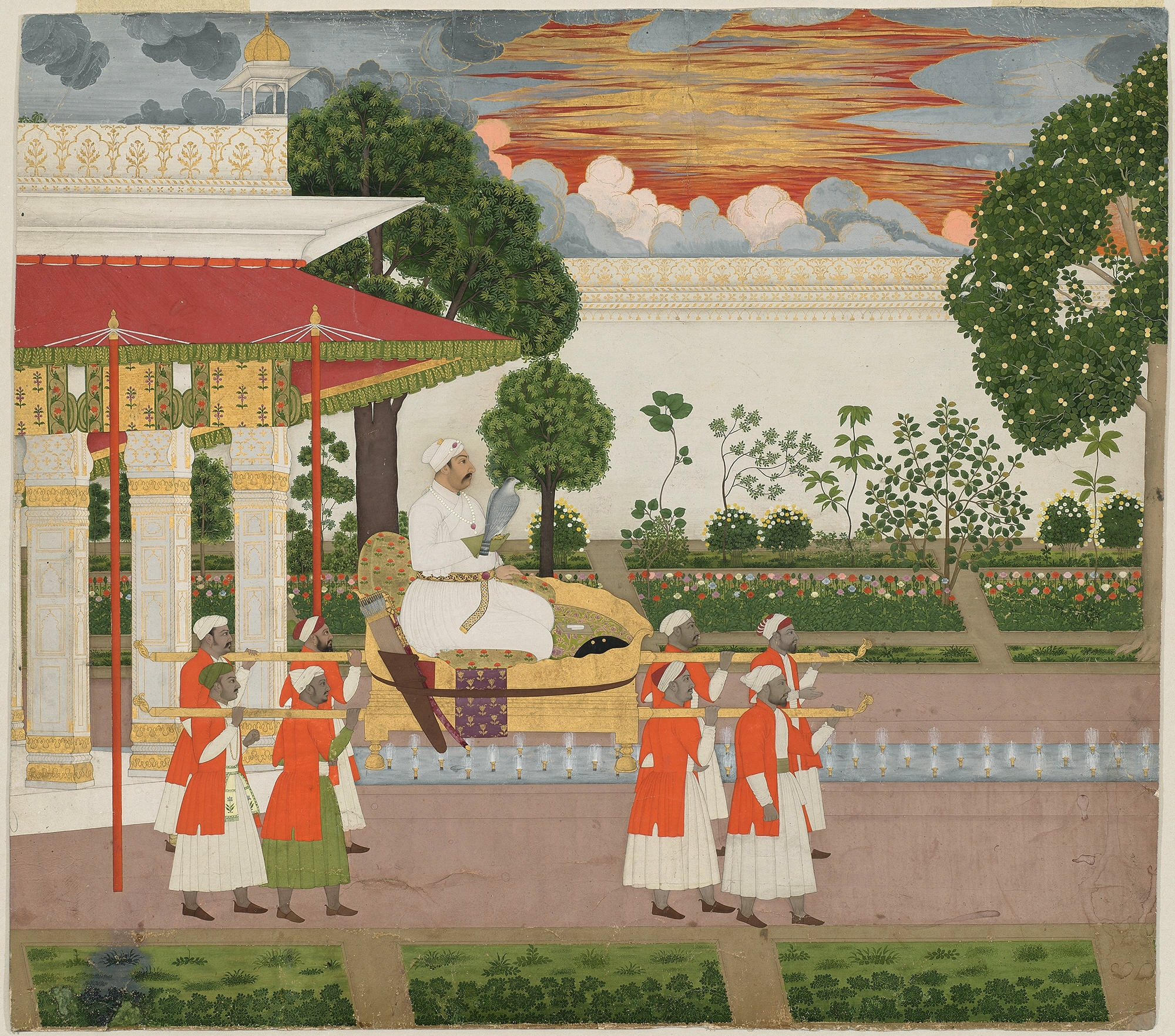
The Mughal Emperor Muhammad Shah with his Falcon visits the imperial garden at sunset on a palanquin.

On 9 October 1720, Syed Hussain Ali Khan Barha, the commander and chief of the Mughal army, was assassinated in his encampment in Todabhim and Muhammad Shah took direct command of the army. Asaf Jah I was then dispatched to gain complete control of six Mughal provinces in the Deccan, and Muhammad Amin Khan Turani was assigned as the Mansabdar of 8000. He was sent to pursue the Mughal Grand vizier Syed Hassan Ali Khan Barha, who was defeated at the battle of Hasanpur by Muhammad Amin Turani, Khan-i Dauran, Sher Afkan Panipati, and Amin-ud-Din Sambhali. Hassan Khan Barha fought on the side opposing Khan-i-Dauran where the most danger was anticipated, was captured on 15 November 1720 and executed two years later. The fall of the Sayyid Brothers would mark the beginning of the end of the Mughal Empire's direct control over its dominions in the Deccan.

=== Loss of Deccan subahs ===
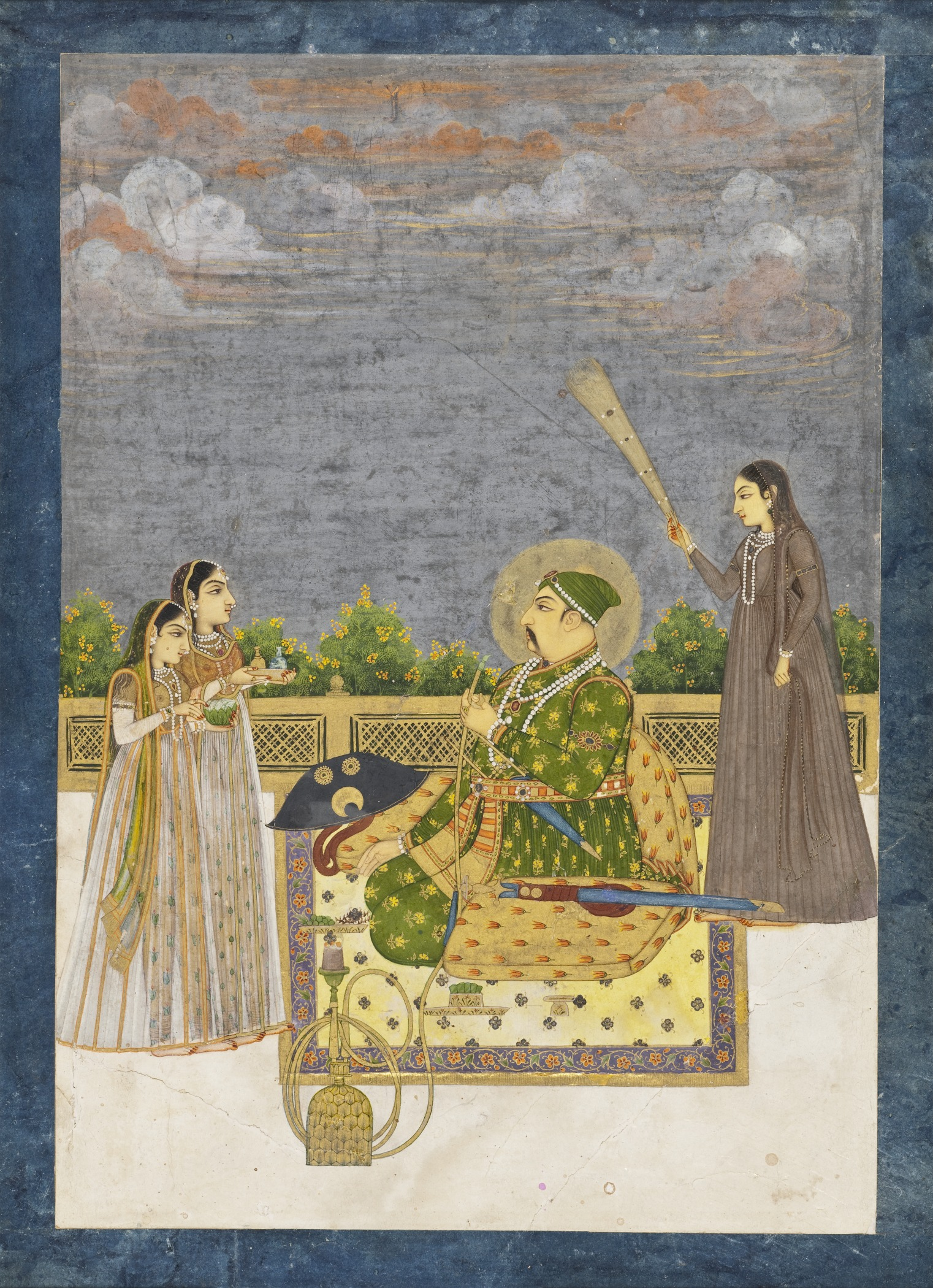
The Mughal Emperor Muhammad Shah and his family

On 21 February 1722, Muhammad Shah appointed Asaf Jah I as Grand Vizier. He advised Muhammad Shah to be "as cautious as Akbar and as brave as Aurangzeb". Asaf Jah used his influence with the emperor to fulfil his territorial ambitions in the Deccan. He lost the emperor's confidence when he appointed Hamid Khan, a relative to Saadullah Khan and his maternal uncle, to administer Gujarat after sending him on the pretext of restoring order to the province. Realising his loss of influence and trust from the emperor, Asaf Jah resigned as Grand Vizier and returned to the Deccan.

Asaf Jah I appointed Commander Ewaz Khan as the master of the garrison at Aurangabad, and much of his logistical duties were carried out by Inayatullah Kashmiri. In 1723 he set out on an expedition to the Deccan, where he fought Mubariz Khan, the Mughal Subahdar of the Deccan, who had kept the ravaging Maratha Empire at bay. Mubariz Khan was a former ally of the Barha Sayyids, who was appointed by Muhammad Shah to kill Asaf Jah I. Taking advantage of Mubariz Khan's conventional weaknesses, Asaf Jah I defeated and eliminated his opponent during the Battle of Shakar Kheda. Asaf Jah I then established the Hyderabad State and appointed himself the Nizam of Hyderabad in 1725.

The Mughal-Maratha Wars (1728–1763) would cause irreparable devastation to six Deccan subahs–Khandesh, Bijapur, Berar, Aurangabad, Hyderabad and Bidar. Asaf Jah would tell the Marathas to invade Malwa and the northern territories of the Mughal Empire to protect his newfound independence. The Nizam described the Maratha army to be an instrument to be wielded to his own advantage in the Maasir-i Nizami:

"I consider all this army (Marathas) as my own and I will get my work done through them. It is necessary to take our hands off Malwa. God willing, I will enter into an understanding with them and entrust the Mulukgiri (raiding) on that side of the Narmada to them."

The ears of Muhammad Shah were possessed by the Amir-ul-Umara, Khan-i Dauran. Muhammad Shah appointed Qamar-ud-Din Khan as Grand Wazir to succeed Asaf Jah. However, he was quickly dismissed in favour of Roshan-ud-Daulah Turrah Baz Khan, a native of Panipat, who was appointed the Grand Wazir, in order to reduce the influence of the Turani family.

Despite the loss of the Deccan subahs in 1724, the Nawab of Awadh Saadat Ali Khan and the Mughal subahdar Dilawar Khan (r. 1726–1756) remained loyal to the emperor and established a well-protected bastion on the Malabar Coast.

=== Cultural developments ===
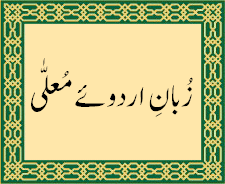
The phrase Zuban-i Urdū-yi Muʿallá (literally "Language of the exalted Horde", contextually the exalted Urdu Language) written in Nastaʿlīq script.

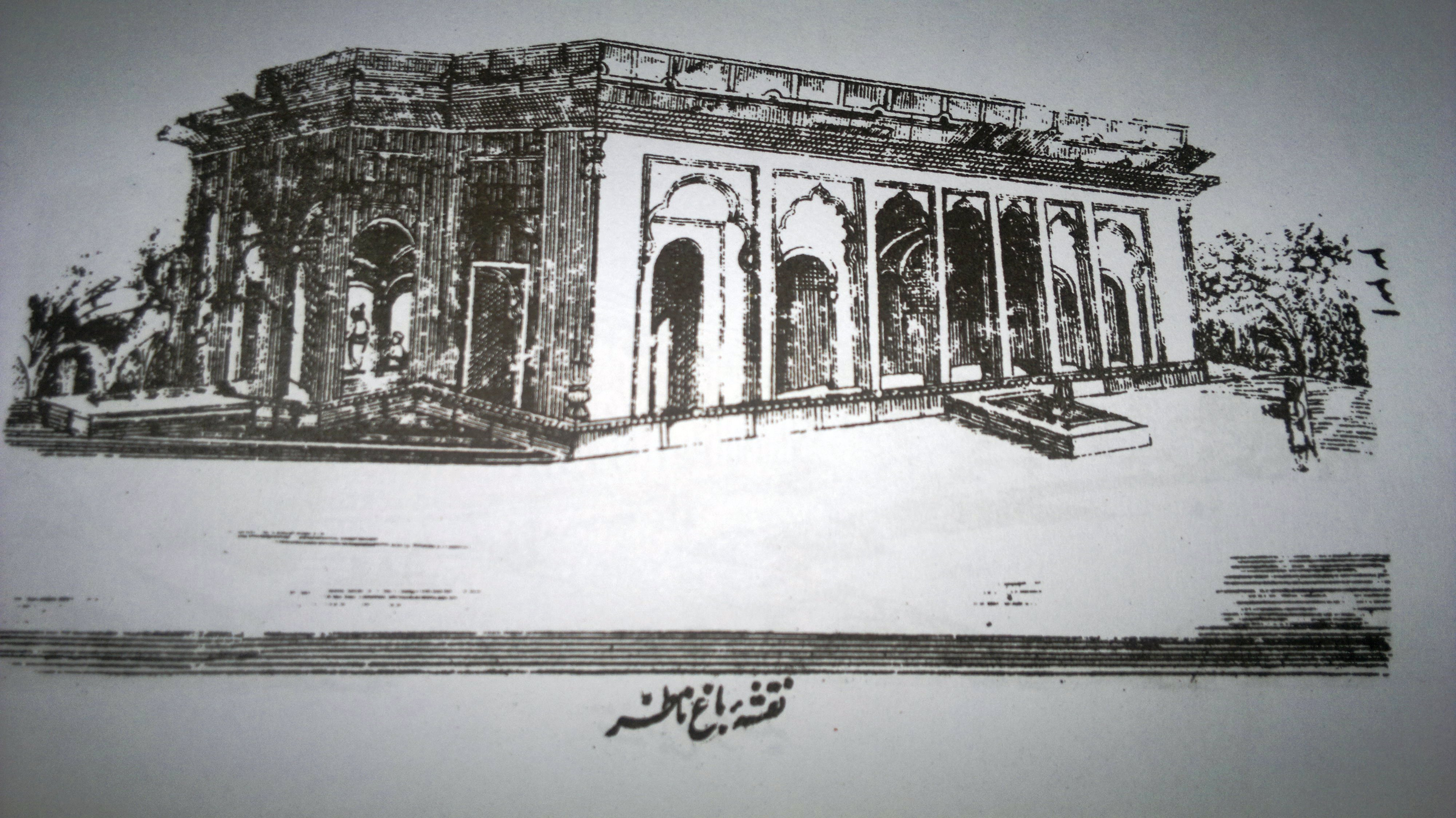
Baagh e Naazir was built by Muhammad Shah the year 1748.

While Urdu (derived from Zuban-i Urdū-yi Muʿallá or in local translation Lashkari Zaban, shortened to Lashkari) was already in use before Muhammad Shah's reign, it was during his reign that it became more popular among the people and he declared it as the court language, replacing Persian. During Muhammad Shah's reign, Qawwali was reintroduced into the Mughal imperial court and it quickly spread throughout South Asia. Muhammad Shah is also known to have introduced religious institutions for education such as Maktabs ( original arabic plural makātib ). During his reign, the Quran was translated for the first time into simple Persian and Urdu. Also, during his reign, the formal Turkic dress, normally worn by the high Mughal nobility since Mughals originally hailed from Samarqand, was replaced by the Sherwani. However, Muhammad Shah's adoption of the Deccan-influenced dress to court would lead to derisive comments, such as "See how the Deccan monkey dances!"

Muhammad Shah was a patron of the performing arts, almost at the cost of administrative priorities, paving the way for the disintegration of governance. While Mughal political power did decline in his reign, the Emperor encouraged the arts, employing master artists such as Nidha Mal (active 1735–75) and Chitarman, whose vivacious paintings depict scenes of court life, such as Holi celebrations, hunting and hawking. The Mughal court of the time had musicians such as Naimat Khan, also known as Sadarang, and his nephew Firoz Khan (Adarang), whose compositions popularised the musical form of khyal. Naimat Khan composed khyal for his disciples and he never performed khyal. This key component of Indian classical music evolved, ascended and received princely patronage at the court of Muhammad Shah.

He himself was a poet under the penname "Sadrang" and was also a composer of Indian classical raga songs in the bhairav, kafi, dhamar and malkauns genres. These included songs on the themes of love and the festival of Holi.

=== Scientific developments ===
During the reign of Muhammad Shah, a significant scientific work known as the Zij-i Muhammad Shahi was completed by Jai Singh II of Amber between the year 1727 and 1735; it consisted of 400 pages.

=== Rebellious activities against Muhammad Shah ===
In 1719, the Kolis of Mahi River were most rebellious against Mughal rule and plundering the villages, Mihir Ali Khan, who was acting as Viceroy of Gujarat at the place of Ajit Singh of Marwar, marched against the Koli rebels of Mahi who were committing piracy against Muslims and subdued them.

In 1721, Kasim Ali Khan, who was an officer of the Mughal Empire under Muhammad Shah employed against the Kolis of Kheda district to collect the fine but they refused to pay and there was a battle in Pethapur between the Kolis and the Mughal Army under Khan. Khan was killed by the Kolis and the Mughal army was defeated and retreated to base.

In 1722, Muhammad Bahadur, son of Salabat Khan Babi, was placed in charge of Sadra and Virpur, with the title of Sher Khan. Shortly after his arrival the viceroy marched against and subdued the rebellious Kolis of the Chunval but was wounded deeply. After that Kolis of Modhera opposed Muhammad Shah and Modhera village was burnt down.

In 1729, Mughal Viceroy of Sultan Muhammad Shah faced the challenge of anti-muslim activities of Kolis of Sorath, The viceroy marched against Kolis of Sorath and after destroying them, he took them to Ahmednagar. After this, Jawan Mard Khan Babi who was the Governor of Petlad gave an order against rebellious Kolis of Balor, at probably Bhátod about fifteen miles east of Bharuch, but Jawan Marad Khan was killed by a man of the Koli tribe, and in revenge for his death the town of Balor was plundered. On the death of Jawán Mard Khan, at the request of Salabat Muhammad Khan Babi, his eldest son Kamal-ud-din Khan Babi received the districts of Sami and Munjpur and the title of Jawan Mard Khan.

In 1738, Sher Khan Babi was in Junagadh appointed as governor of Sorath, Babi was obliged to march against a Koli chieftain Kanji Chunvalia of Chhaniar in Chunval because Kanji opposed and resisted the Mughal authority, but Sher Khan Babi was fiercely resisted by Kolis so Momin Khan was called with a large force and Chhaniar was burned down by the Mughal army.

In 1739, Koli chieftain Jamaji of Thara, raised the Kolis of Kankrej against the Padishah and continually plundered Mughal territory. Jawan Mard Khan was ordered to march against the Koli chieftain but he was unable to maintain order, so he requested Fida-ud-din Khan to subdue the Kolis. After defeating the Koli chieftain, the Koli country was plundered by Mughal troops.

In 1740, Kolis of Atarsumba, challenged Mughal authority and refused to pay any form of tax to the Mughal Padishah. Jawan Mard khan along with his brother Zorawar Khan Babi, marched against Kolis of Atarsumba but they strongly resisted resulting in a battle, Mughals defeated the Kolis and forced them to pay tax. But it was not for a long time, after some time, Kolis again refused to pay tax and Mughal troops were sent under Abdul Hussain Khan and Vajeram burning three Koli villages.

In 1747, Rangoji a Maratha military leader returned to Áhmedábád, and Jawán Mard Khán had an interview with him a few miles from the city. Shortly after this, the Kolis of Mehmudabad and Mahudha rebelled, but the revolt was speedily crushed by Sháhbáz Rohilla.

=== Bengal and Sikhs raids ===
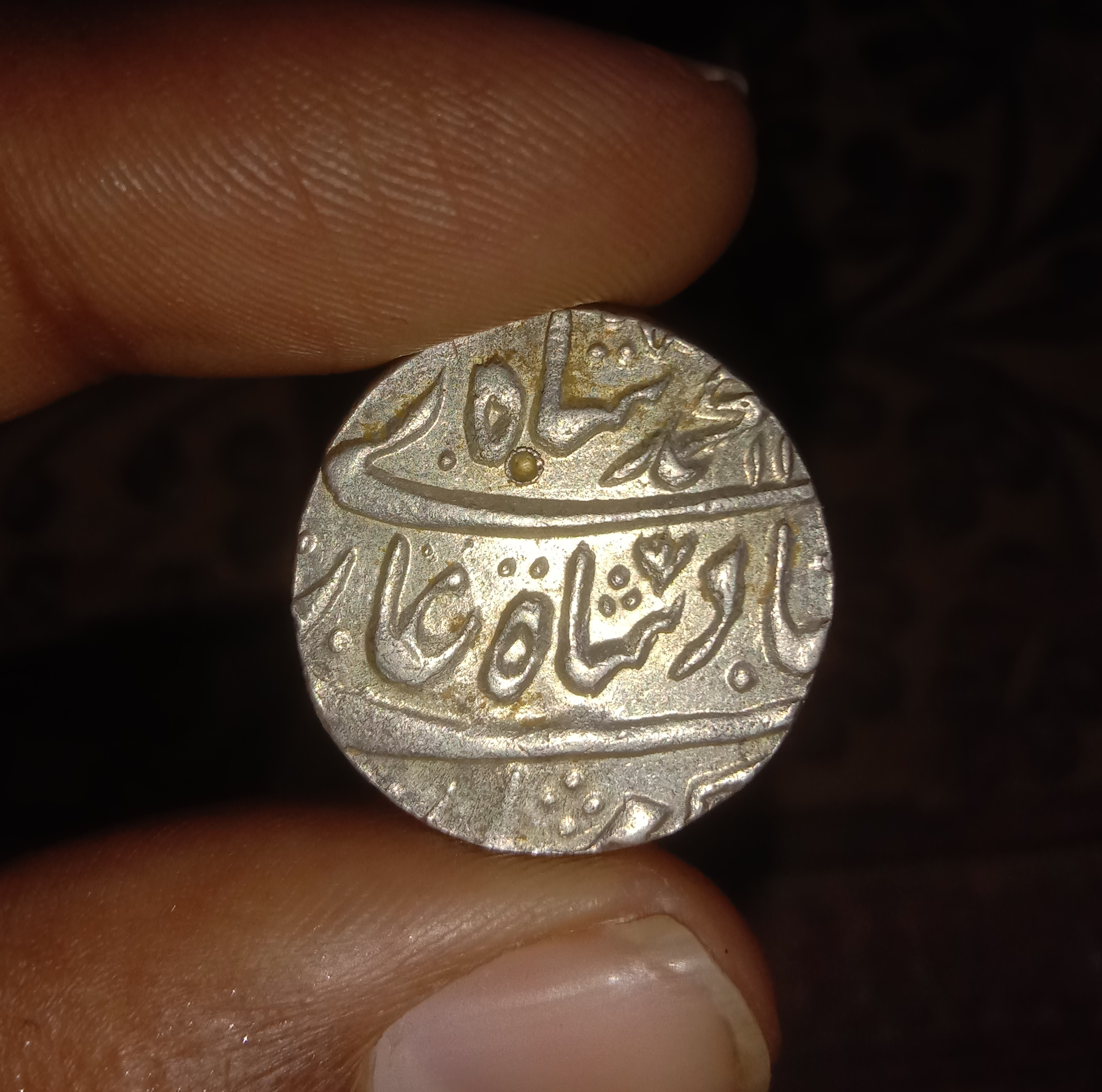
Silver Rupee issued by Mughal emperor Muhammad Shah for the Bengal Subah, struck in Muhammadabad Benaras Mint.

Muhammad Ali Khan the Mughal Faujdar of Rangpur and his stern ally Deena Narayan were ambushed out of Koch Bihar by Upendra Narayan a Hindu Bihari and Mipham Wangpo (r. 1729–1736) the ruler of Bhutan. Ali Mohammed Khan had established the barons of Rohilakhand. In the Punjab region, the Sikhs were at war with local Mughal subahdars, devastating them with their hit-and-run tactics.

=== Loss of Gujarat and Malwa subahs ===
After decisively defeating Asaf Jah in February 1728 at the Battle of Palkhed, Bajirao I and his brother Chimaji Appa re-invaded Malwa. The Mughal subahdar Giridhar Bahadur was defeated and killed at the battle of Amjhera in November 1729. Chimnaji Appa then unsuccessfully attempted to besiege the remnants of the Mughal army at Ujjain.

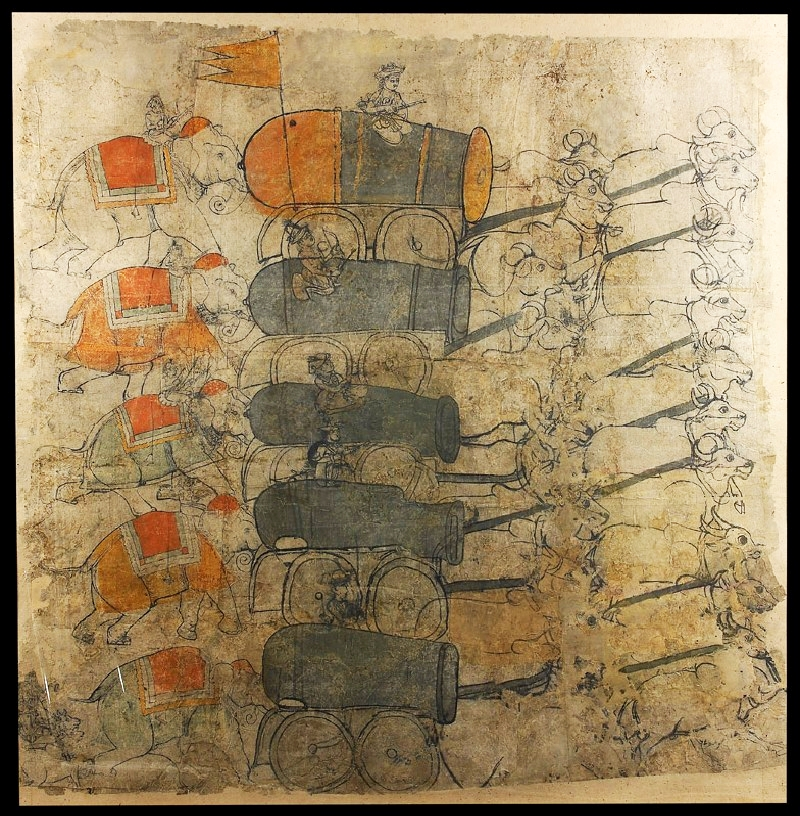
Elephants pushing Mughal artillery cannons drawn also by bullocks.

In 1731, Asaf Jah managed to secure the defections of influential Maratha leaders, such as Trimbak Rao Dabhade and Sanbhoji who threatened to abandon the Marathas and join the forces with the emperor Muhammad Shah. However, the defectors were overrun and killed by a large Maratha force led by Bajirao I and Chimnaji Appa during Battle of Dabhoi. Bajirao I then attacked Gujarat with his full force and drove out Sarbuland Khan by 1735.

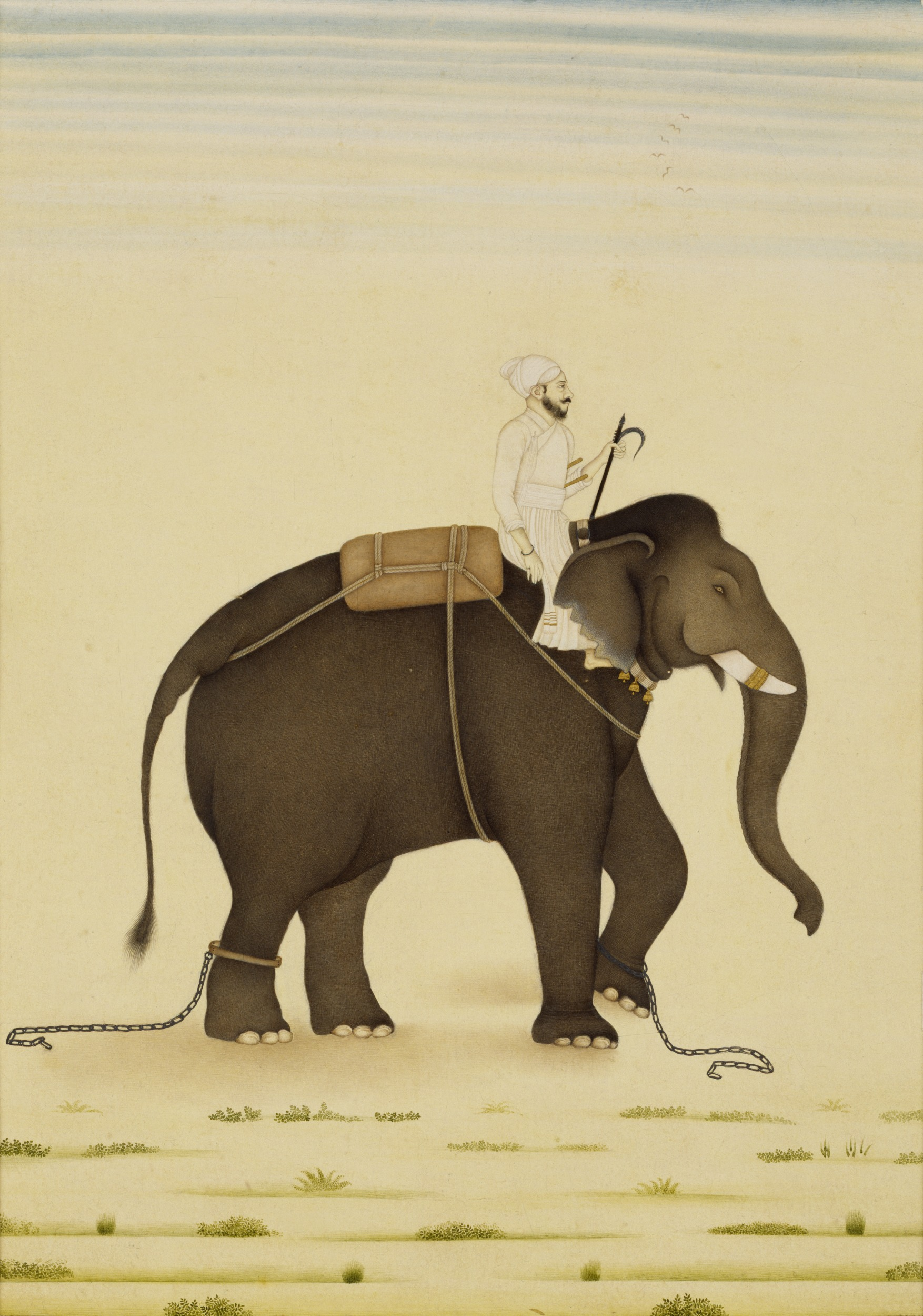
An elephant and its mahout in service of the Mughal Emperor Muhammad Shah.

Bajirao I defeated a well-trained Mughal army led by Amir Khan Bahadur at Rikabganj. He did not proceed with his victory although he could have taken the city unopposed. He withdrew after receiving intelligence of the advancing forces of Wazir Qamar-ud-Din Khan. Bajirao with his army retreated to the southeast at Badshahpur, where he corresponded with the emperor Muhammad Shah, who ratified peace by agreeing the handover of Malwa to the Marathas.

== Invasion of Nader Shah ==
=== Invasion of Mughal empire ===
In May 1738, Nader Shah attacked northern Afghanistan and captured Ghazni. He captured Kabul in June and Jalalabad in September. By November, he had crossed the Khyber Pass and besieged and razed the fortress of Peshawar. In January 1739, he captured Lahore, after completely subduing the forces of the Mughal viceroy, Zakariya Khan Bahadur and his 25,000 sowars, by the Chenab river. The Afsharid forces soon encountered bands of Sikh rebels whom Nader Shah predicted would clearly benefit after his invasion. The Afsharids would capture territory all the way up to Attock, forcing Muhammad Shah and his court to realise that the Turkic Qizilbash Afsharid emperor would not be satisfied with the loot of a province. The cities of Wazirabad, Eminabad and Gujrat were not only sacked but razed to the ground. Near Larkana, the Afsharids completely routed the Mughal army of the Nawab of Sindh, Main Noor Mohammad Kalhoro, and later captured him and his two sons. Sirhind was then captured by the Afsharids in February 1739, opening the route towards the Mughal capital of Delhi.

=== Battle of Karnal ===
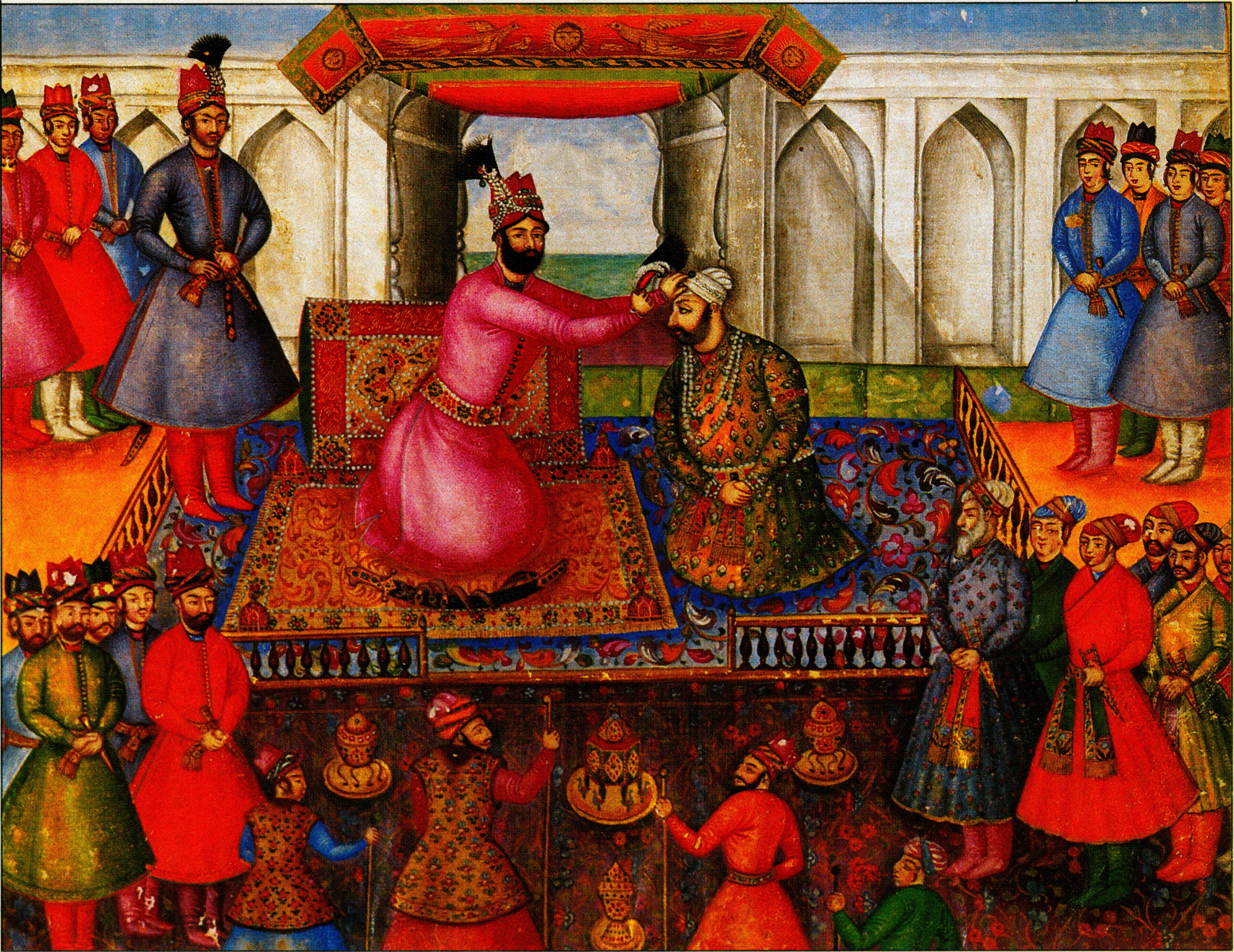
Muhammad Shah with the Turkic invader Nader Shah, art from Nader's court historian Mirza Mehdi Khan Astarabadi, who was a firsthand witness of the encounter

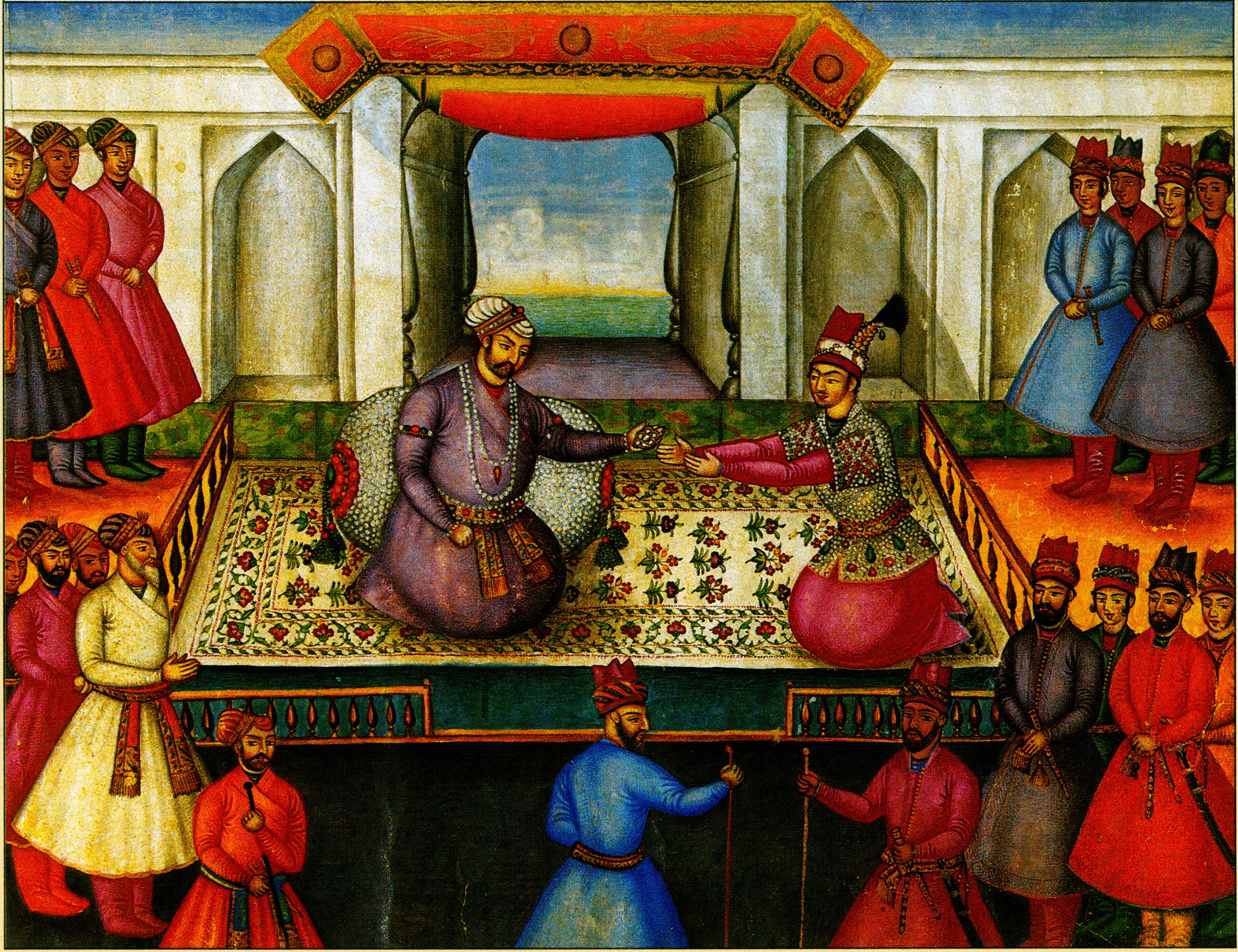
Muhammad Shah with an Afsharid prince, art from Nader's court historian Mirza Mehdi Khan Astarabadi, who was a firsthand witness of the encounter

Rao Bal Kishan of Rewari, with his army of 5,000 infantry and 2,000 cavalry and with the forces of Delhi, attempted a desperate defence of the city but was killed in battle and has been immortalized the name "Vijay or "Veergati". Nader Shah remarked to Emperor Muhammad Shah that "if your combined forces helped Rao Balkrishna of Rewari, then I might not able to enter in Delhi. I had never seen any warrior like him brave, fierce and strong. Muhammed Shah commissioned a royal chhatri to pay tribute to Rao Bal Kishan.

After entering Delhi, Nader Shah claimed invasion and occupation of the Mughal Empire was borne out of religious devotion and that if "the wretched Marathas of the Deccan" moved towards Delhi, he might "send an army of victorious Qizilbash to drive them to the abyss of Hell."

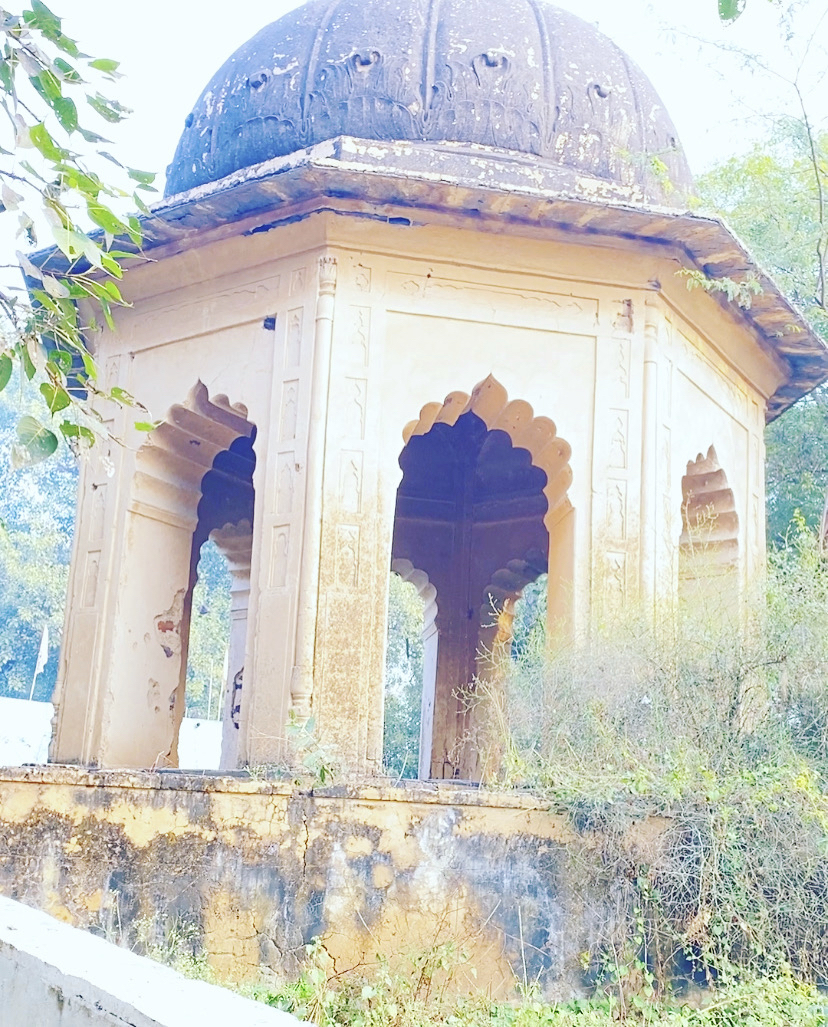
Rao Bal Kishan Chhatri at Karnal

=== Sack of Delhi ===
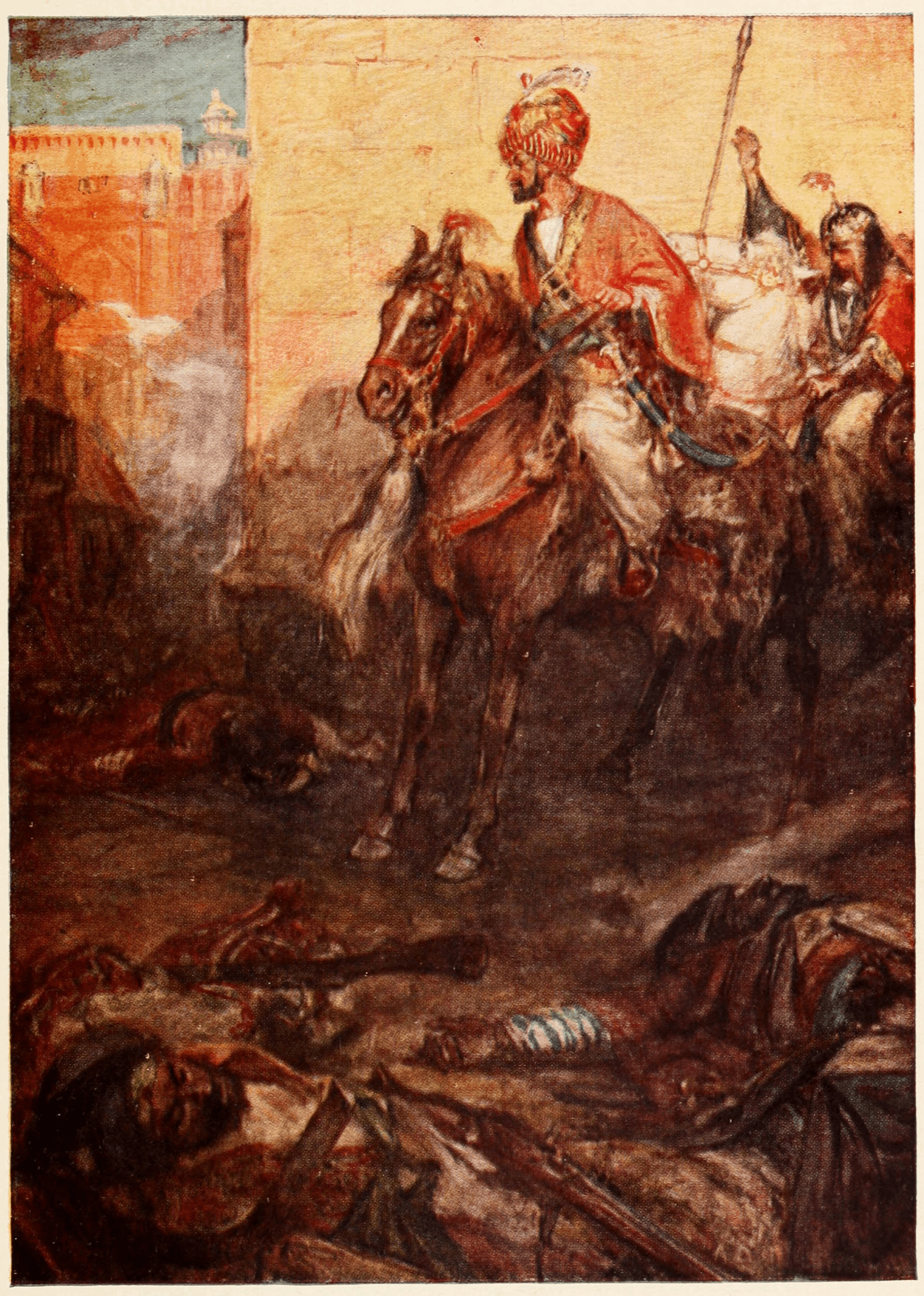
Nader Shah finds his troops had been killed in rioting. From Surridge, Victor (1909). Romance of Empire: India.

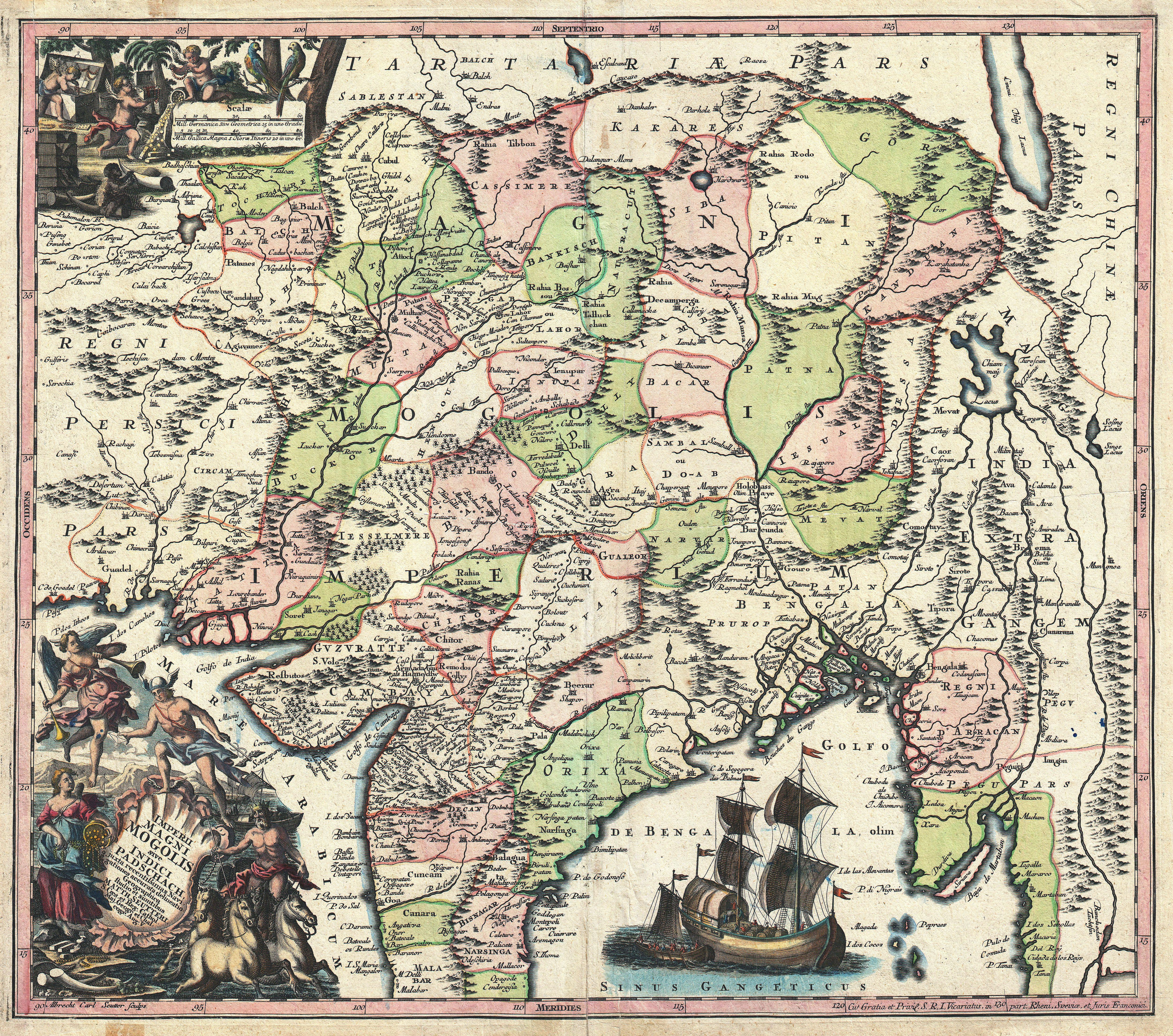
Provinces of the Mughal Empire in the year 1740

The occupation of Delhi was initially cordial, however, rumours spread throughout the city that Nader Shah was assassinated. The masses attacked the Afsharid force and killed some soldiers. Nader Shah became furious, ordered to massacre the populace, and leaving at least 30,000 dead. Muhammad Shah and Asaf Jah I had to beg Nader Shah for mercy and thus he stopped the massacre and turned to looting the Mughal treasury. The famous Peacock Throne, the Daria-i-Noor and Koh-i-Noor diamonds and unimaginable wealth was looted. In addition, elephants, horses and everything that was liked was taken. Muhammad Shah also had to hand over his daughter Jahan Afruz Banu Begum as a bride for Nader Shah's youngest son. Asaf Jah I retired to Deccan after installing his eldest son Intizam-ud-Daula as a major commander in the Mughal Army.

== Later Maratha wars ==
In the year 1740, Dost Ali Khan to Nawab of the Carnatic and Chanda Sahib faced the task of expelling the Marathas under Raghoji I Bhonsle, authorised by Chhatrapati Shahu I. Dost Ali Khan was killed on 20 May 1740 at the Battle of Damalcherry in defence of Arcot, which was eventually looted and plundered. Chanda Sahib along with his garrison was captured and imprisoned in Satara. Chanda Sahib and his forces ferociously defended their rightful reams during the Siege of Trichinopoly and almost all the territories of the Nawab of the Carnatic despite being outnumbered substantially by the Marathas, their daunting efforts soon attracted the attention of the French East India Company official Joseph François Dupleix.

Dissatisfied by the Maratha occupation of the territories of the Nawab of the Carnatic, Asaf Jah I led an expedition to liberate the region. He was joined by Sadatullah Khan II and Anwaruddin Muhammed Khan together they recaptured Arcot and initiated the Siege of Trichinopoly (1743), which lasted five months and forced the Marathas led by Murari Rao Ghorpade to evacuate the Carnatic.

In the year 1747, the Marathas led by Raghoji I Bhonsle, began to raid, pillage and annex the territories of the Nawab of Bengal Alivardi Khan. During the Maratha invasion of Orissa, its subahdar Mir Jafar completely withdrew all forces until the arrival of Alivardi Khan and the Mughal Army at the Battle of Burdwan where Raghoji I Bhonsle and his Maratha forces were completely routed. The enraged Nawab of Bengal Alivardi Khan then dismissed the shamed Mir Jafar. However, due to four years of continuous wars, Emperor Muhammad Shah was forced to cede Orissa to the Marathas.

== Foreign relations ==
Following Nader Shah's invasion, the Ottoman Empire exploited the void that was created at their eastern borders as almost all Persian forces were deployed to India. During that period, Emperor Muhammad Shah tried to recover all territory lost to Persia until being attacked by the Afghan Durrani Empire at Battle of Manupur.

== Marriages ==
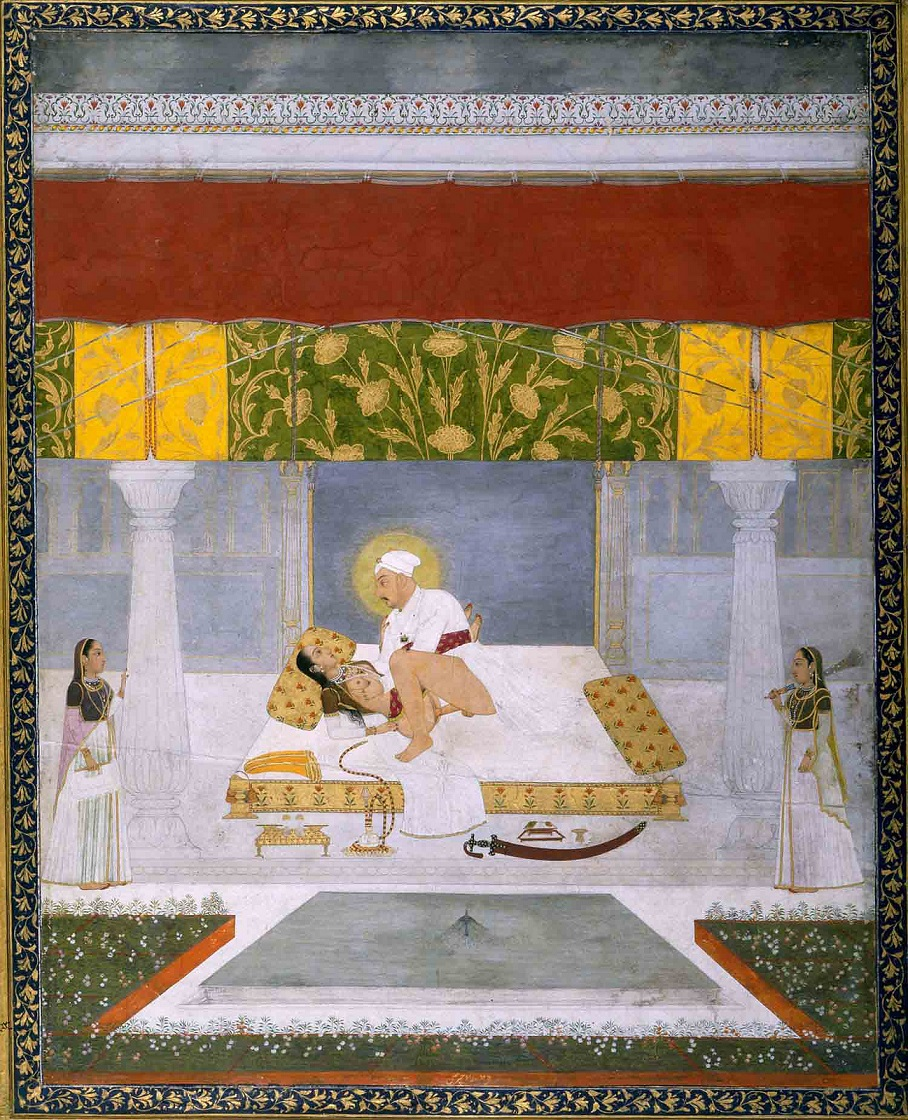
Muhammad Shah having sexual intercourse, ca. 1735 by Chitarman II

Emperor Muhammad Shah had four wives. His first wife and chief consort was his first-cousin, Princess Badshah Begum, the daughter of Emperor Farrukhsiyar and his first wife, Gauhar-un-Nissa Begum. They married after his accession, on 8 December 1721, at Delhi, and he gave her the title Malika-uz-Zamani (Queen of the Age) by which she was popularly known. They had a son, Shahriyar Shah Bahadur, who died young in 1726. She died on 14 December 1789.

Muhammad Shah took a second wife, Sahiba Mahal, and had a daughter Hazrat Begum, who was married to Ahmad Shah Durrani in 1757.

His third wife was a dancing girl, Qudsia Begum, who bore him his successor, Ahmad Shah Bahadur on 23 December 1725. Upon his birth, he was taken from her and was lovingly brought up by Badshah Begum, who considered him her own son. It was through Badshah Begum's efforts that Ahmad Shah was able to ascend the throne upon Muhammad Shah's death in 1748. He had another woman who hailed from tawaif origins, Nur Bai, as a favorite.

== Death ==
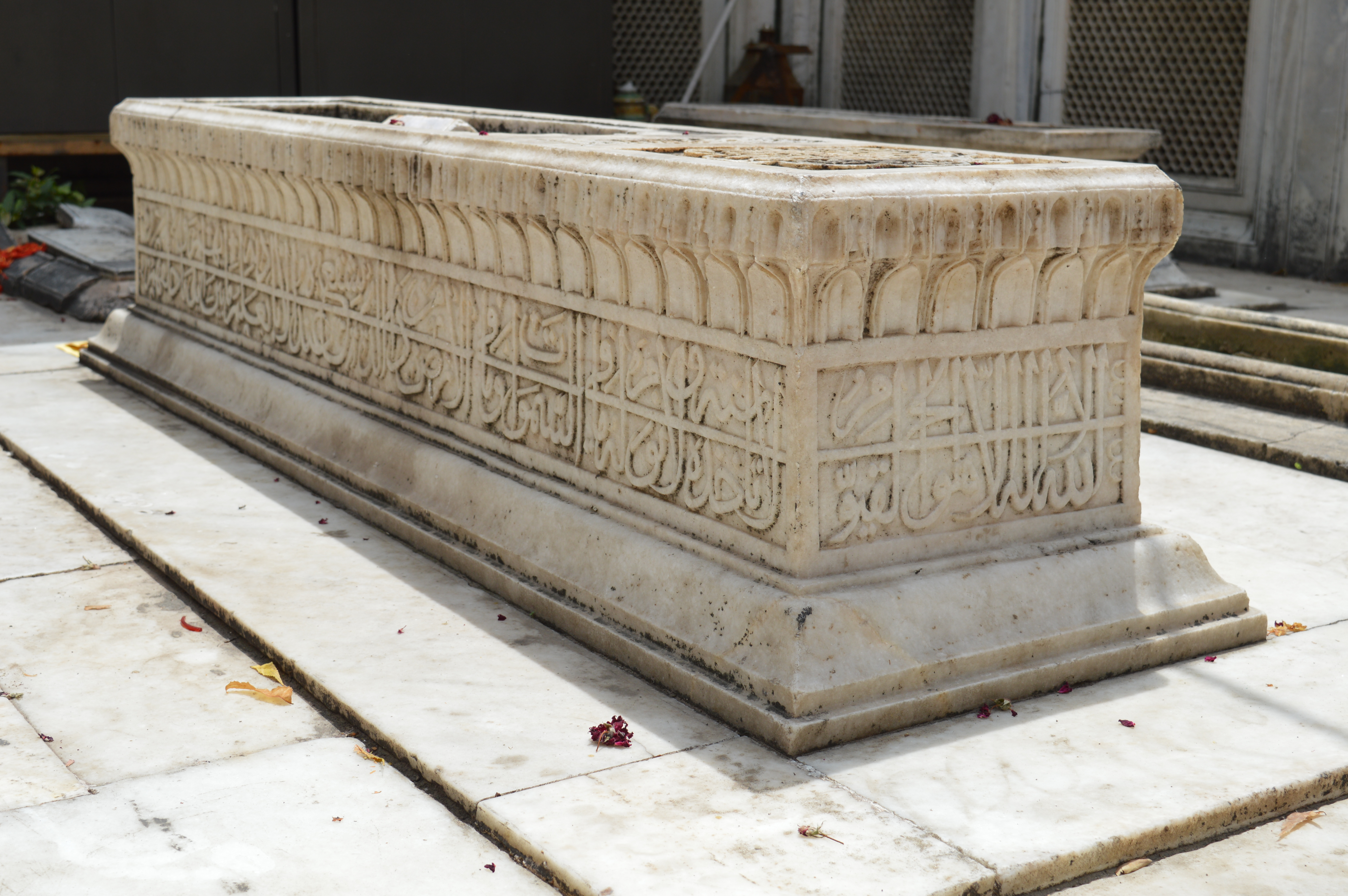
Tomb of Muhammad Shah, in the courtyard of the Nizamuddin Dargah.

The victory of the Mughal Army during the Battle of Manupur (1748) came with a heavy price as many fell in battle. Initially this was kept a secret. However, when the news reached the Mughal Emperor Muhammad Shah, he could not speak, suddenly became sick, and did not come out of his apartments for three days. During this period he fasted. His guards could hear him crying out loud and saying: "How could I bring about anyone as faithful as he? (Qamaruddin Khan)". He died due to grief on 26 April 1748, his funeral was attended by visiting Imams from Mecca. Muhammad Shah's tomb is located in an enclosure within the Nizamuddin Dargah complex.

== In popular culture ==
- In the 2010 historical TV series Maharaja Ranjit Singh telecasted on DD National, the character of Muhammad Shah is portrayed by Rishikesh Sharma.

== Gallery ==
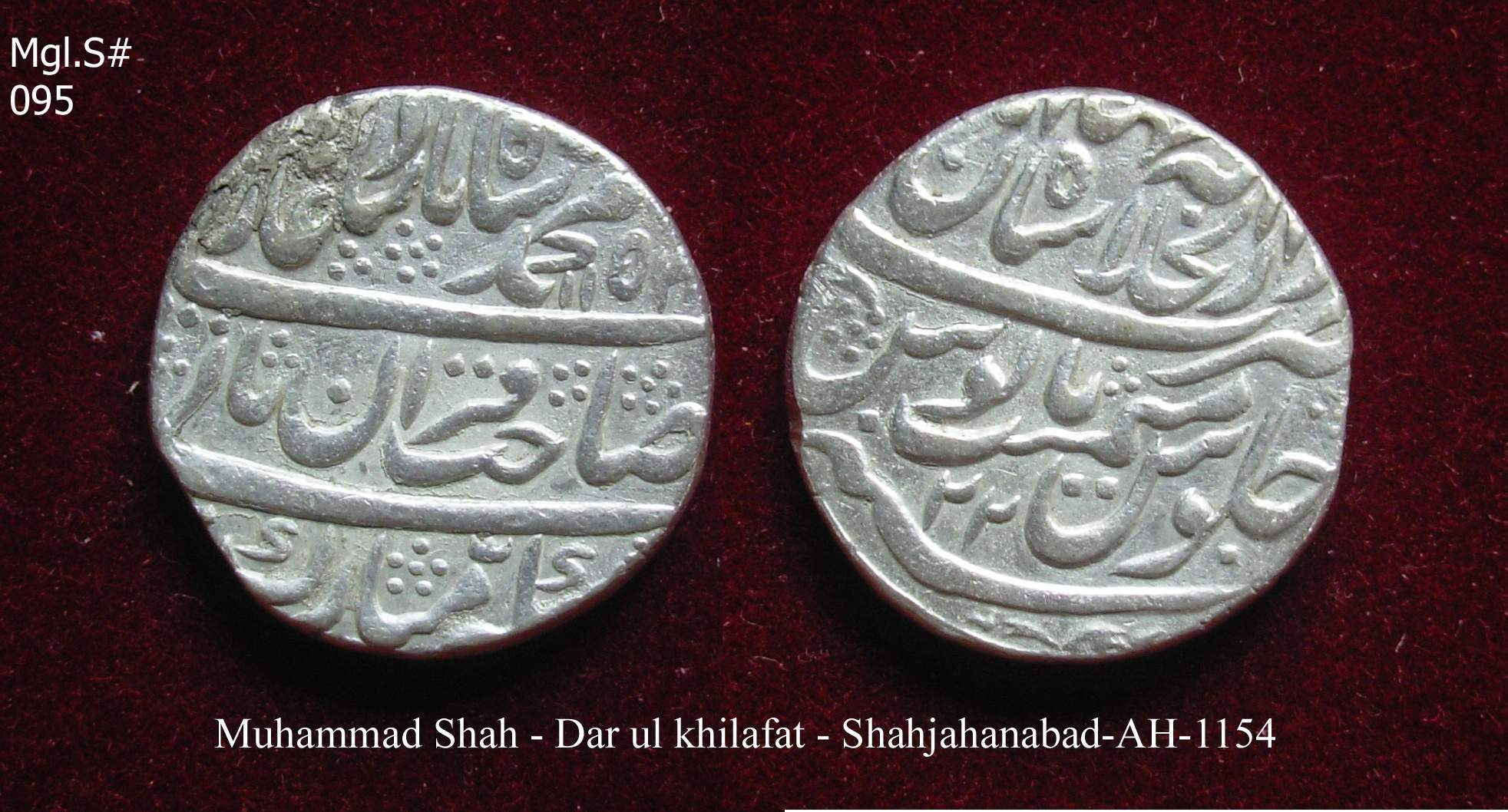
A silver coin minted during the reign of the Mughal Emperor Muhammad Shah.

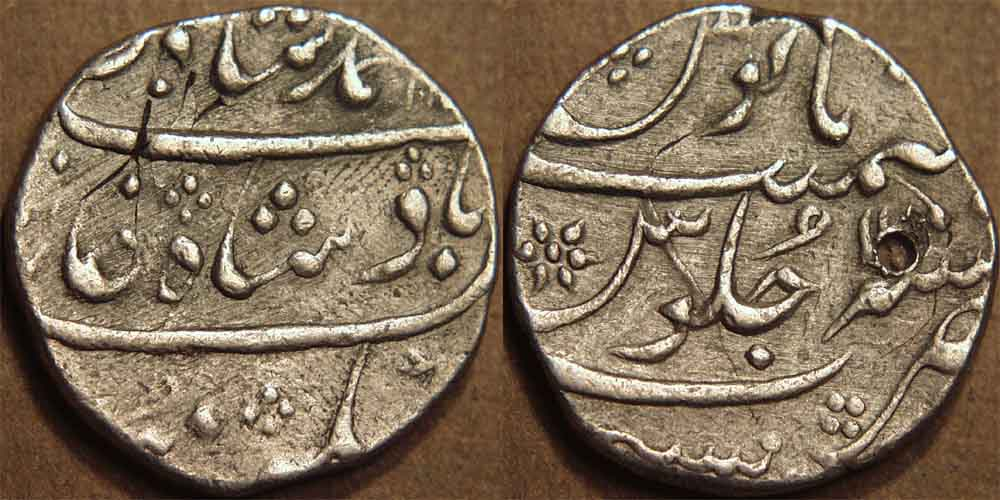
A silver coin minted during the reign of the Mughal Emperor Muhammad Shah from Bombay.

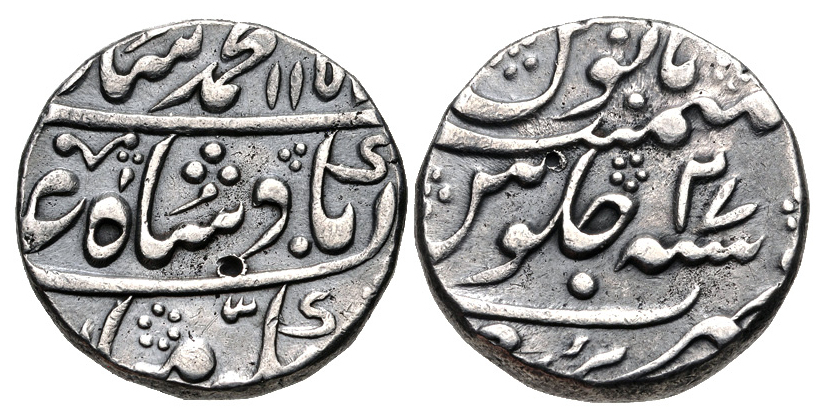
Coinage of Jaipur from the time of Ishvari Singh, in the name of Muhammad Shah. Sawau Jaipur mint, dated 1744–45 CE.

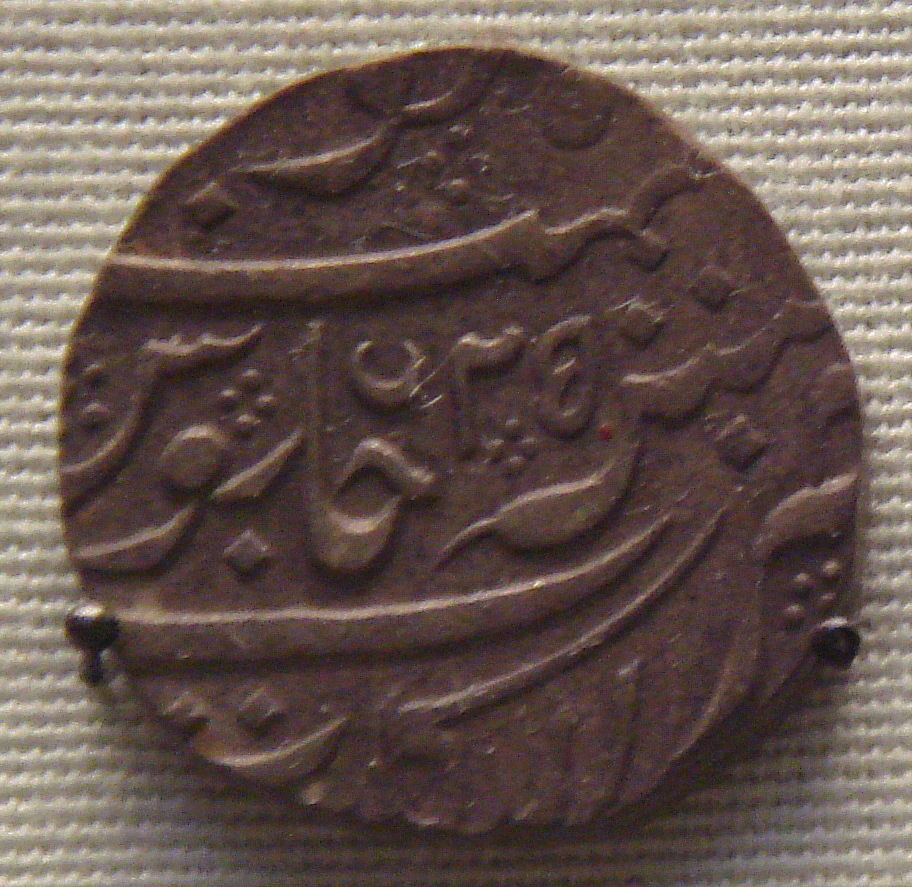
French-issued rupee in the name of Muhammad Shah (1719–1748) for Northern India trade, cast in Pondichéry.

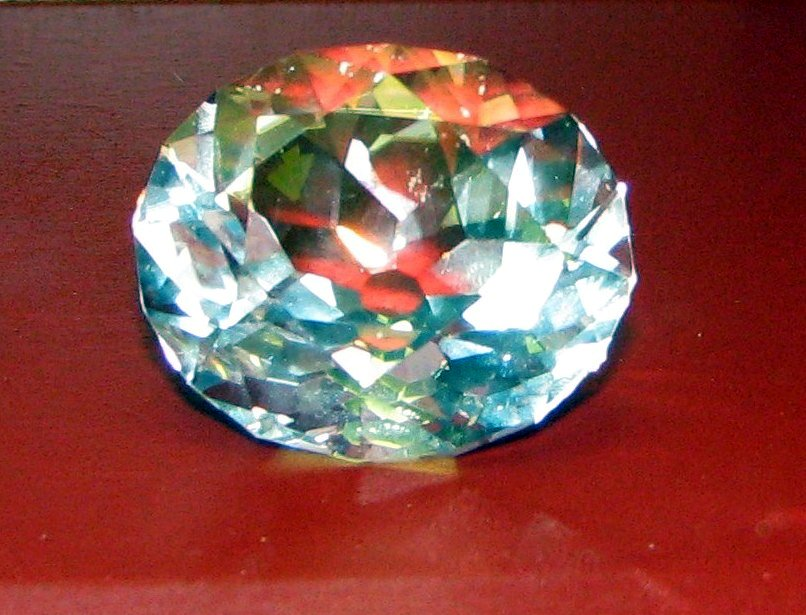
Koh-i-Noor

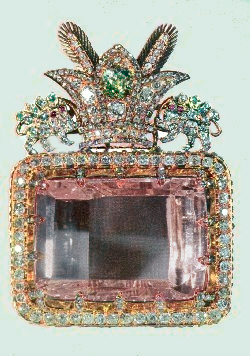
Darya-e-Noor

== See also ==
- Battle of Karnal
- Koh-i-Noor
- Peacock Throne
- Battles involving the Mughal Empire
- Ahirwal
- Rewari

Preceded by Shah Jahan II	Mughal Emperor; 1719–1748	Succeeded by Ahmad Shah Bahadur
