= Jahan Shah (Mughal Emperor) =

Brief Mughal emperor in 1788

Jahan Shah جهان شاه
- Padishah; Al-Sultan Al-Azam
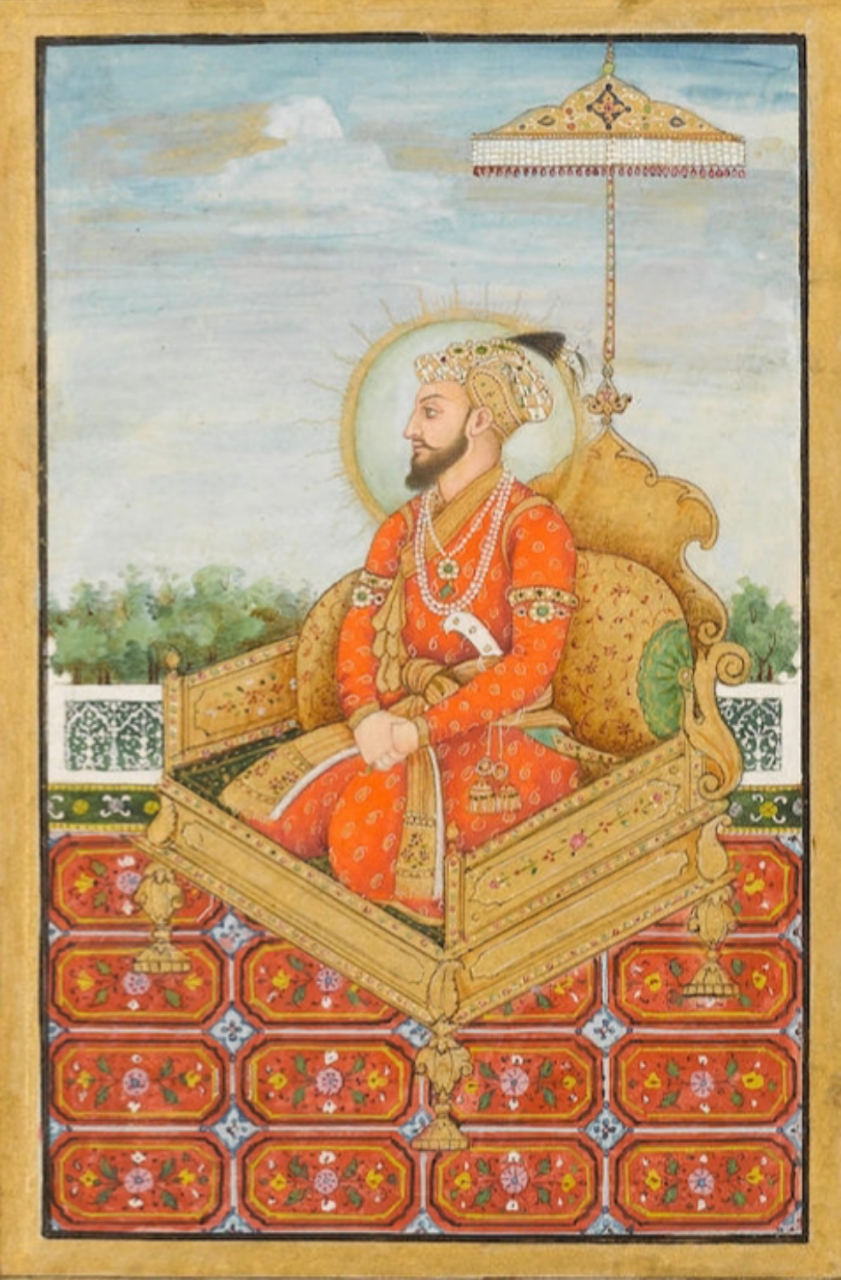
- Portrait by Ghulam Ali Khan

18th Mughal Emperor
- Reign: 31 July – 11 October 1788
- Predecessor: Shah Alam II
- Successor: Shah Alam II
- Born: Mahmud Shah Bahadur; 1749; Red Fort, Delhi, Mughal Empire (now in India)
- Died: 1790 (aged 40–41); Shahjahanabad, Delhi, Mughal Empire
- Burial: Old Delhi, Delhi, India
- Issue: Nawab Najabat Afruz Banu Begum Sahiba; Nawab Muhammadi Begum Sahiba
Names
- Mirza Bidar Bakht Mahmud Shah Bahadur Jahan Shah
Regnal name
- Jahan Shah (Persian: جهان شاه )
- House: Mughal dynasty
- Dynasty: Timurid dynasty
- Father: Ahmad Shah
- Religion: Sunni Islam (Hanafi)

Bidar Bakht Mahmud Shah Bahadur (Persian: بیدار بخت محمود شاه بهادر, also known by his regnal name Jahan Shah (Persian: جهان شاه), was the eighteenth Mughal emperor for a brief period in 1788 after Shah Alam II was deposed by Ghulam Kadir, Mahmud Shah Bahadur was the son of a former Mughal Emperor, Ahmad Shah Bahadur. He himself became emperor for a brief period in 1788 as a puppet of Ghulam Kadir, after Shah Alam II had been deposed and blinded. He was allegedly put to death in 1790 by order of Shah Alam II, supposedly for usurping his authority in 1788.

== Early life ==
Born as Prince Bidar Bakht, he was the eldest surviving child of Emperor Ahmad Shah. Sometime afterwards, he was granted the title of Mahmud Shah Bahadur and was also known as Banka, a term used then in Mughal India referring distinguished warriors or champions. He was given the governorship of Punjab in 1753 on the death of the erstwhile governor Mir Mannu, though he remained in court. Upon his fathers' deposition, he was imprisoned in the Salimgarh Palace-prison in June 1754.

== Reign and aftermath ==
In 1788 the Rohilla chieftain, Ghulam Qadir usurped power in Delhi and began subjecting the reigning Mughal Emperor Shah Alam II to verbal, physical and psychological abuse. To find a legitimate means of doing such acts, and due to the machinations of the former Empress Badshah Begum the emperor was deposed and Prince Mahmud Shah was enthroned as Nasir-ud-Din Muhammad Jahan Shah on 31 July 1788. His reign was a titular one. On the day of his accession the whole Red Fort Palace was ransacked by Ghulam Qadir's men. Cruelties and torture were later on perpetrated on the whole Timurid family, sparing not even Badshah Begum or the new emperor. Porters carrying water for the deposed monarch were stopped and rebuked by the Rohilla. Finally, the arrival of Mahadji Shinde's troops forced Ghulam Qadir to flee, who took the emperor with him. He was subsequently deposed by the Shinde after the conquest of Delhi, on 16 October 1788, in favor of Shah Alam II. Ghulam Qadir took him to Mirat where, in desperation at his failures, he threatened to execute the hapless prince and other captives from the Imperial family that he had taken with him but was prevented from doing so by his own bodyguard, Manyar Singh. Thence the Rohilla fled leaving behind the captive princes. When Mirat was captured by Shinde's forces on 18 December, Mahmud Shah was once more imprisoned in the Salimgarh Fort. He died in 1790, allegedly on the orders of Shah Alam II for his role in the 1788 disturbances and for treason against the House of Babur. He left behind two daughters.

== Bibliography ==
- Sarkar, Jadunath (2007). Fall of the Mughal Empire (1739–1803) in 4 Volumes. Orient Longman. ISBN 9788125032458.

Jahan Shah (Mughal Emperor) Timurid dynasty
Regnal titles
Preceded by Shah Alam II	Emperor of the Mughal Empire; 1788	Succeeded by Shah Alam II
