= Yanaon =

French colony in India (1731–1954)

Coordinates: 16°44′N 82°13′E

French settlement of Yanam Établissement français de Yanaon
- Former subdivision of France
- January 1723–August 1962
- Flag Coat of arms

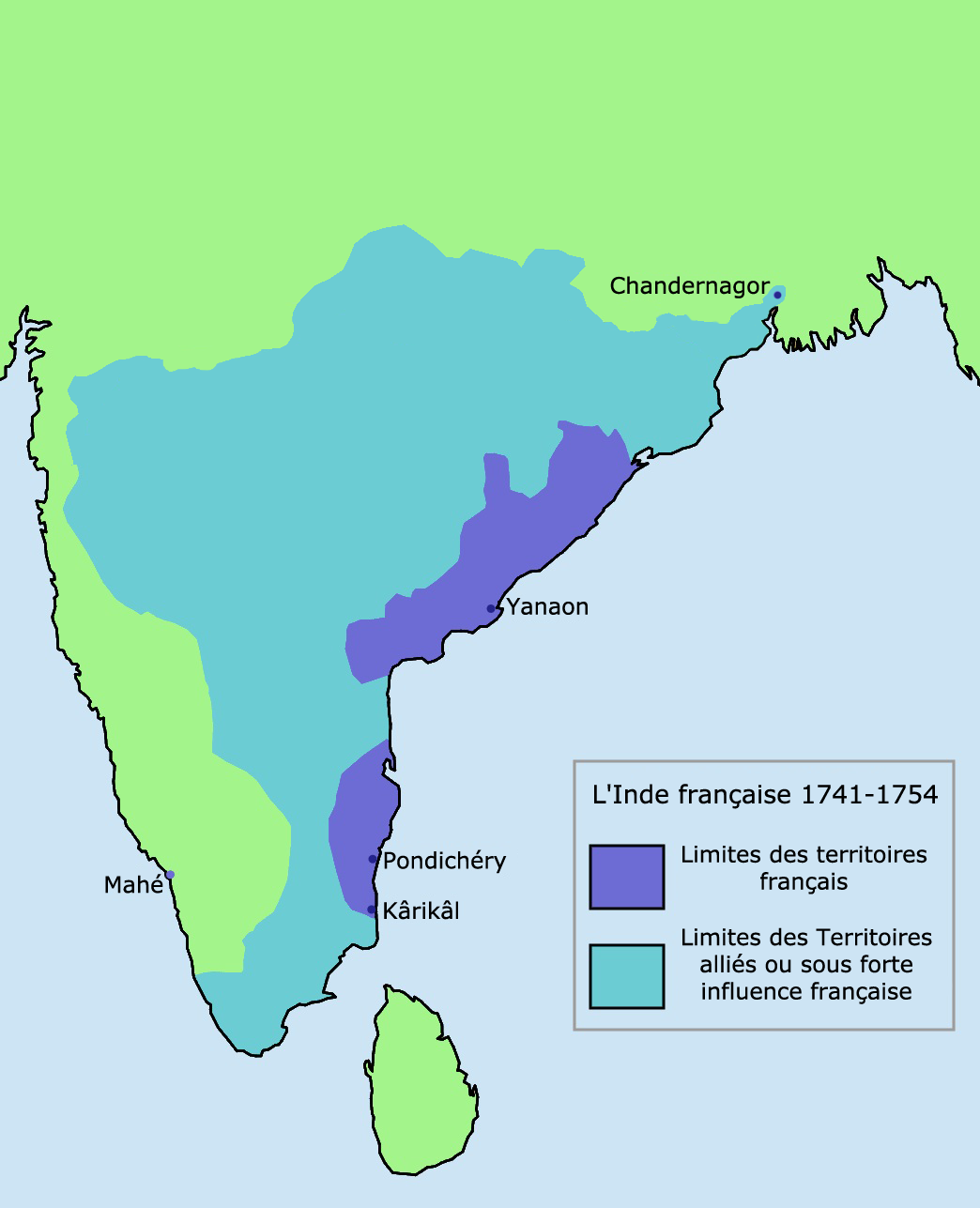
- Maximum extent of French influence (1741–1754)
- Capital: Pondichéry
- Population
  - 1948: 5,853
  - 1936: 5,220
  - 1885: 4,266
  - 1843: 4,000
- Government
  - Type: Republic
- Historical era: Imperialism
  - Established: January 1723
  - Abandoned: 1727
  - Re-established: 30 July 1731
  - Sovereignty granted by Nizam Muzaffar Jung: 1751
  - Sovereignty ratified by Mughal emperor Ahmad Shah Bahadur: 1753
  - Coup d'État (France lost Sovereignty): 13 June 1954
  - De facto transfer to India: 1 November 1954
  - De jure transfer to India: 16 August August 1962
Preceded by	Succeeded by
Hyderabad State	Yanam (India)

Yanaon (French: [janaˈɔ̃], Telugu: [jaːnaːm], Tamil: [eːnaːm]) was one of the five principal settlements of French India between 1731 and 1954. It was referred to in British records as Yanam.

== Early years ==
=== Reason for European interests ===
The French in their earlier records does mention their interest in establishing trade in the Northern Circars, which lie in the coastal regions of the Hyderabad sultanate. The Northern circars are very important as they sway a big influence in the court of Deccan Subah. This Subah is indeed the most important among all other provinces of the Mughal empire in the Indian peninsula. The Mughal Empire considers Deccan as their principal power. In some old records, it was mentioned as Ayanaon, a big village in the Circar of Rajamindri, situated along the Ingiram river. This French establishment very well flourished before the setback and failures of the French during the Seven Years' War. From this town and its surroundings, beautiful towels are manufactured. These towels are referred as guinées du Nord. As per the 1783 report by French, "one judges the fineness of this cloth by the number of Conjons...These guineas of Yanaon were made of 'roui' Cotton which has very long threads" (sic).

Apart from the above political reason, the areas in and around Yanaon were very fertile and the textile industry flourished. The English and Dutch also established many colonies in the Circars of Rajamundry and Ellore. In these circars, the English had colonies in Draksharama (1633), Veeravasaram (1634), Narsapuram/Madapollam (1679), Injaram (1708), Coringa (1759), Neelapalli (1751), Bendamurulanka (1751) and the Dutch made their presence in Palakollu (1613), Jagannathapuram (1734).

Administrative location of Yanaon at the time of French establishment in 1723
Village	Paragana	Circar	Subah	Empire
Yanaon	Injaram	Rajahmundry	Deccan	Mughal Empire

The Subah of Deccan (i.e. Hyderabad) had 22 Circars and Rajamundry circar had 17 paraganas comprising 24 mahals in it with Injaram being on them.

=== Possible Dutch presence ===
In the west of Yanam, there are still Nīlikunḍīlu (Indigo wells). People say that the Dutch constructed a fort here. It is being called by locals as "saali kota" because previously weavers (Saalivandru) used to weave clothes. Some people believe that the Dutch used to keep their currency, minted in the mint at Neelapalli, in this fort. The Dutch were very active during the seventeenth century and by the start of the eighteen century, their presence in India became very nominal. The records office of Madras presidency do mention some file regarding Yanam Dutch settlements when mentioning the Godavari district records (Yanaon is an enclave in East Godavari district). As per British records, the nearest Dutch settlements to Yanaon are Draksharam and Jaggernaikpoeram. At Injaram, a whopping number of 2000 weavers worked for the Dutch and around 700 for the English. As the textile industry flourished in Godavari districts where the French colony of Yanaon is an enclave, perhaps the Dutch may have made some presence in Yanaon as well. The Dutch factors in Draksharama refer to the villages of Dulla and Vemagiri as being particularly important sources of cloth. Perhaps they may have some trade relationship with the weavers of Yanaon. The Dutch must have left Yanaon well before the French arrival in 1723.

=== Uncertainty in early history ===
It is not known exactly when the French founded Yanaon before 1723. It was assumed that Yanaon did not exist as a Human settlement before 1706 as that area was densely forested and got ravaged by a severe cyclone in 1706 as narrated by an eye-witness Gollapoondi Nagichitty (Gollapudi Nagishetty). Thus, unlike other major French settlements in India, the year when French got sovereignty (i.e.circa 1750) is usually mentioned as the year of establishment in some French records. However, there is an old Vishnu temple located in the rue Vichenou of Yanaon and popular belief is that it was built many centuries ago (i.e. well before French presence). However there two more nearby villages along the mouths of Godavari in Andhra Pradesh that bear the similar name. They are Surasani Yanam (S. Yanam) (Note: There is a popular legend that this village was given as Inam by a local ruler to Sūrasāni, a dancing girl (courtesan) and it was known as Surasani Inam in the past which over the time got corrupted as Surasani Yanam. The word sāni in the Telugu language implies courtesan or a dancing girl.) in Uppalaguptam Mandal and Chirra Yanam in Katrenikona mandal. The name Yanaon may have come from the word Inam. (Note: The word Inām is of Arabic origin and means a gift and in medieval Indian political sense 'a grant of land'. The Inām grants were originally rent-free and perpetual. They were given for services previously rendered. The holder of an Inām was referred to as Īnāmdār.)

== 1723 Establishment ==
The main colonial history of Yanam starts in the early 18th century. French agent M. Courton was resident since 1721 at the French Colony of Masulipatam and played a major role in the establishment of the French presence in Yanaon. As per the letter dated 24 January 1723 by M. Courton to the Superior Council of French India at Pondichéry, it was mentioned that he purchased some land by the Godavari River, near the (Paragana of) Ingiron-Yanaon to establish a magasin (i.e. trading post). Its affairs were supervised by the French colony Masulipatam, which was by then already an important colony for European powers (English, Dutch, and French). French trade got permitted at Masulipatam by a firm from the King of Golconda dated 15 October 1669. In 1687, the Mughal empire annexed Golconda and later the Deccan subah came under the rule of its governor Mubariz Khan who ruled from 1712 until 1724. The establishment of Yanam roughly coincided with the cession of Deccan Subah from Mughal Empire and forming the Hyderabad sultanate right after the 1724 Battle of Shakar Kheda.

=== 1727 Abandonment ===
As per the letter of Dupleix dated January 1928, Yanaon became so profitless and the future seemed to be dim. Under the pretext of the tyranny of local nawabs and governors, the Superior council in Pondicherry forced then French agents at Yanaon, M. Fouquet and M. Guillard to wind up the affairs and abandon it.

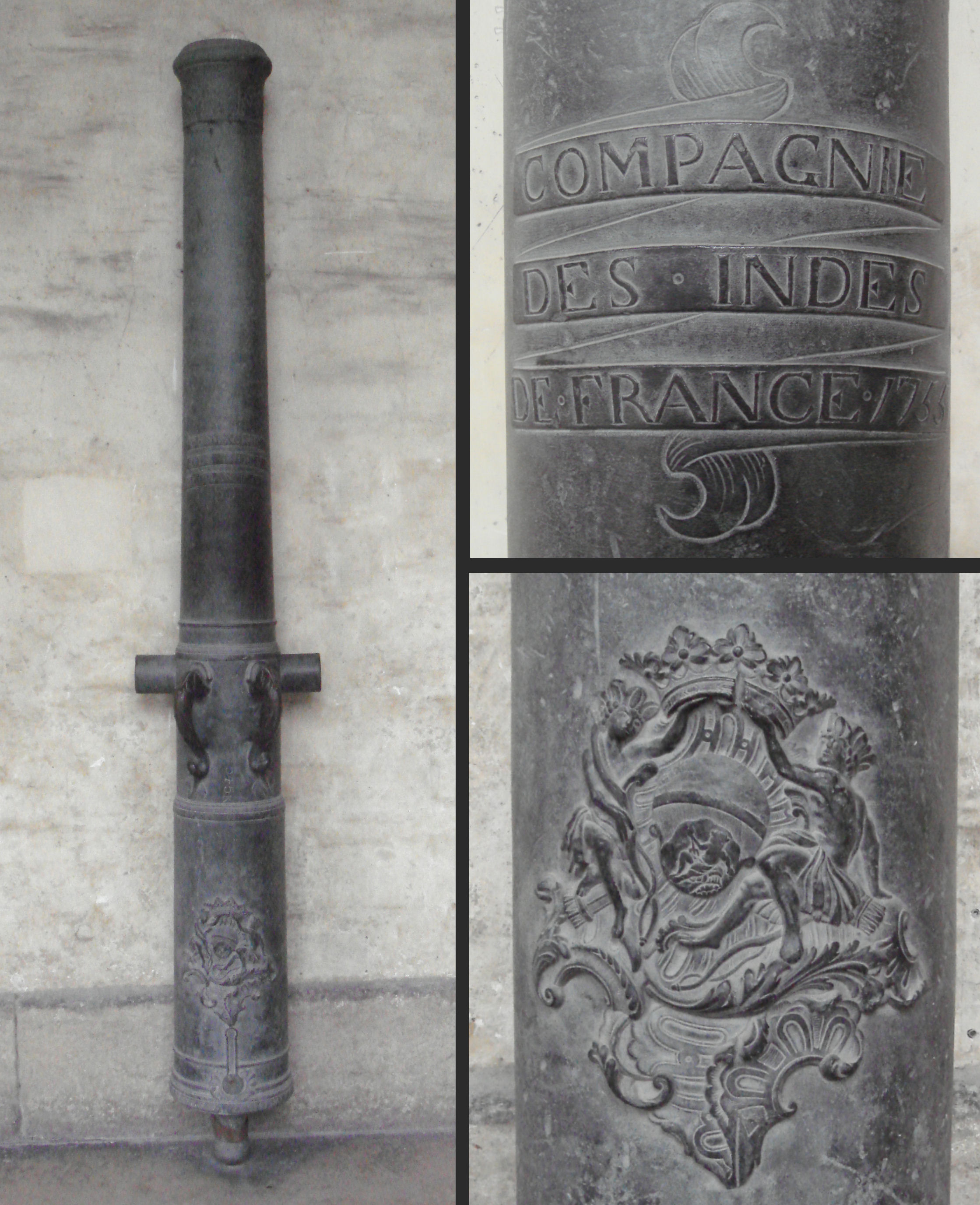
A French Indies Company cannon ("Canon de 4"). Bronze, 1733, Douai. Caliber: 84mm, length: 237cm, weight: 545kg, ammunition: 2kg iron balls. The company's coat of arms can be seen on the Canon.

== 1731 Re-establishment ==
The possession of Rajahmundry and Chicacole circars was disputed between the Nizam of Deccan and the Gajapatis. Mir Qamaruddin, then Nizam of Deccan, settled this issue in 1713. Anwaruddin Khan was appointed Faujdār for these two provinces. He appointed his Tabedār Rustum Khan alias Haji Mohammad Hussain to collect the arrears of tribute from Zamindars in these two circars. Rustum Khan was a Turkish officer who was Nawab (i.e. Faujdar) of Rajahmundry between 1730 and 1737.

=== 1731 Paravana ===
A paravana dated 24 May 1731 from Haji Mohammad Hussain, Nawab of Rajahmundry (i.e. Faujdar of this Circar (Note: A Faujdar is ranked next to Nizam (governor) and is the head of the Sarkar, which was an administrative and a revenue division of a 'Subah'.)) authorised the French Representative Fouquet, then chief of the Company at Machilipatnam to re-establish up a loge (Note: Loge implies a trade zone where the French enjoyed legal and fiscal privileges.) at Déchavarom (Draksharama) near Yanaon. As per Puducherry government records, this parawana was meant for re-establishment loge at Yanaon.

French re-established in Yanaon on 30 July 1731. M. Guillard became the first chief of Yanam, holding office for 17 long years. The French records also credit M. Guillard for the establishment of a loge at Yanaon, which was within the paragana of Venjaram, in the Circar of Rajamahendri for the purpose of trading teakwood and towels (handkerchiefs). Guillard was a great merchant and a great captain.

=== 1734 Paravana ===
During June (or July) 1934, a paravana has been issued by the Nawab Dost Ali Khan Bahadur of Carnatic to M. Guillard for making the Pagodas of Pondichéry as the legal tender in Yanaon. Chanda Sahib who allied with French during the Carnatic wars was the son-in-law of Nawab Dost Ali Khan.

=== 1735 Paravana ===
Nawab Rustum khan (i.e. Haji Mohammad Hussain) granted a paravana dated 4 February 1735 for French commerce in Yanaon.

After 1742 political motives began to overshadow the desire for commercial gains of the French East India Company. All factories were fortified for the purpose of defense. M. De Choisy administered it. He died here on 24 October 1747. Monsieur Sinfray succeeded him. Until 1743, the French paid an annual rent for their possessions in Yanaon to the Nawab of Rajamundry. This annual rent was waived by a paravana that was issued in 1743. Anwaruddin Khan, Nawab of Arcot, granted all the rights on the lands situated before the quarters at Yanam to the French on 9 November 1748.

== Era of Nasir Jung ==
After the death of Asaf Jah I, his son Nasir Jung succeeded him. However, a succession war broke out between Nasir Jung and his nephew Muzaffar Jung (grandson of Asaf Jah I). The French sided with the latter and this angered Nasir Jung who ordered his forces in 1750 to capture the French factories located in Masulipatam and Yanaon. In that year, Masulipatam was captured during May and Yanaon was besieged during July.

== Era of Muzaffar Jung ==
However, on 20 September 1750, Yanaon along with Masulipatam was returned to M. Guillard, Chef de Yanaon, who was representing the French.

Later, Muzaffar Jang, Nawab Subedar of the Deccan (1750–1751) succeeded Nasir Jung. As a token of gratitude for the French support, Muzaffar Jang conferred on the French the Circar of Masulipatam (Yanaon was governed as a dependence of Masulipatam colony by French). Additionally to that, he granted sovereignty of Yanaon, Karaikal, and some adjoining areas of Pondicherry to the French during his visit to Pondicherry in December 1750.

Since the Nizam was only a subedar of Deccan, Muzzafar Jung technically does not hold any right to give away territories to the French without the permission or consent of his liege lord, the Padishah of Hindustan (i.e. Mughal Emperor). But the Mughal Padishah Ahmad Shah Bahadur, unlike his father, was only a figurehead and his imperial firmans were respected by subordinates (such as subedars, faujdars, etc) only when it suited their purposes. A firman (or farmānā) is a royal decree issued by the Emperor and meant to be irrevocable. For decrees issued by royalty lower than the Emperor then such decrees as named as hasbul hukum, nishān and parwānā (or Paravana).

== Era of Salabat Jung ==
Salabat Jang, the son of the Nizam al Mulk, who was indebted for his elevation to the throne to the French Indies Company, granted the district of Kondavid to the French in return for their services, and soon afterward the other Circars. He confirmed all the grants made by Muzaffar Jung to the French and allowed them to rebuild the factory at Yanaon that was completely destroyed by the forces of Nasir Jung during the siege of Yanaon by his army.

An imperial firman dated 14 May 1753 was issued by the Mughal emperor Ahmad Shah Bahadur, confirming all the concessions made to the French by Salabat Jang, the Subedar of Deccan.

In December 1753, a paravana of Salabat Jang, Subedar of Deccan conceded to Bussy the circars of Chicacole, Ellore, Rajahmundry and Mustafanagar with an annual revenue Rs. 2,00,000 for the maintenance of the French troops in the Subah in recognition of the help of these Circars amounted up to 10 lakhs of Rupees per year. These four circars were part of Northern Circars. Bussy helped Salabat Jang to be the Subedar of Deccan. The agreement made between the French and Salabat Jang in Aurangabad bears the signature of Said Loukshur, Minister of Salabat Jang. Yanam acquired considerable importance during the occupation of the Northern Circars by the French.

One street in Yanaon and another in Pondicherry are named in remembrance of Bussy. However, the street in Pondicherry has been renamed 'Lal Bahadur Shastri Street'.

== First British occupation ==
There is again a dearth of information regarding this place from 1753 to 1765. Another important event in history was the war between the French and the English fought at Chandurthi in 1758 in which the French were defeated. Yanam fell into the hands of the British around the same year. Salabat Jang made a treaty with British and gave the Northern Circars under a firman to the English. Later Nizam rebelled against the English. A second treaty was the result of war and Northern Circars remained permanently under the control of the British. After 1760 the French lost hold in South India, especially on Northern Circars. In 1765 Lord Robert Clive, the then-existing Chief and Council at Vizagapatam obtained from the Mughal emperor Shah Alam a grant of the five Circars.

The Article XI of the Treaty of Paris (1763) ensured that the English to handover all the possessions the French held as of 1749. The Article XI of this treaty stated that,

(Dans les Indes Orientales La Grande Bretagne restituera à la France, dans l'Etat où ils sont aujourd'hui, les differens Comptoirs, que cette Couronne possedoit tant sur la Côte de Choromandel & d'Orixa, que sur celle de Malabar, ainsi que dans le Bengale, au Commencement de l'Année mil sept cent quarante neuf; Et Sa Majesté Très Chretienne renonce à toute Pretension aux Acquisitions, qu'Elle avoit faites sur la Côte de Choromandel, & d'Orixa, depuis le dit Commencement de l'Année mil sept centquarante neuf. Sa Majeste Très Chretienne restituera, de son Coté, tout ce qu'Elle pourroit avoir conquis sur la Grande Bretagne dans les Indes Orientales pendant la presente Guerre, & fera restituer nommement Natal & Tapanouly dans l'Isle de Sumatra. Elle s'engage de plus à ne point eriger de Fortifications, & à ne point entretenir de Troupes dans aucune Partie des Etats du Subah de Bengale.

Et afin de conserver la Paix future sur la Côte de Choromandel & d'Orixa, les Anglois & les François reconnoitront Mahomet Ali Khan pour legitime Nabob du Carnate, & Salabat Jing pour legitime Subah de Decan; Et les deux Parties renonceront à toute Demande ou Pretension de Satisfaction qu'Elles pourroient former à la Charge, l'une de l'autre, ou à celle de leurs Alliés Indiens pour les Depredations ou Degats commis soit d'un Coté, soit de l'autre pendant la Guerre.)

(In the East Indies Great Britain shall restore to France, in the condition they are now in, the different factories which that Crown possessed, as well as on the coast of Coromandel and Orixa as on that of Malabar, as also in Bengal, at the beginning of the year 1749. And his Most Christian Majesty renounces all pretension to the acquisitions which he has made on the coast of Coromandel and Orixa since the said beginning of the year 1749. His Most Christian Majesty shall restore, on his side, all that he may have conquered from Great Britain in the East Indies during the present war; and will expressly cause Nattal and Tapanoully, in the island of Sumatra, to be restored; he engages farther, not to erect fortifications, or to keep troops in any part of the dominions of the Subah of Bengal. And in order to preserve future peace on the coast of Coromandel and Orixa, the English and French shall acknowledge Mahomet Ally Khan for lawful Nabob of the Carnatick, and Salabat Jing for lawful Subah of the Decan; and both parties shall renounce all demands and pretensions of satisfaction with which they might charge each other, or their Indian allies, for the depredations or pillage committed on the one side or on the other during the war.).

A document dated 15 May 1765 showed that the villages of Yanam and Kapulapalem (Capouloupalém) with other lands were handed over by Jean white hill and George Dolben, the Englishmen deputed by Mr. Jean Pybus, the head of the English settlement in Masulipatam to Mr. Jean Jacques Panon, French Commissioner deputed by Jean Law de Lauriston the then Governor General of Pondichéry, for taking them over. This document mentions that France entered into possession of Yanam and its dependent territories with exemption from all export and import duties. Soon after taking possession of this settlement, Mr. Panon obtained a firman from the ruler of Rajahmundry granting the French full liberty of trade at Yanam and another one from the Nawab Mir Nizam Ali Khan Bahadur (Asaf Jah II) calling upon the Zamindars of the Circar Mustafanagar not to hinder the commerce of the French.

After the transfer of Northern Circars to the English, Yanam came under the province of Peddapuram in the jurisdiction of Sri Raja Vatsavaya Kala Thimma Jagapathi Bahadhoor (Timma Raja). The French had a modest building in Yanam situated a league from the sea, on the Coringa River into which small vessels could enter.

Preceded by French Indies Company	First British Occupation of Yanaon; 1758–1765	Succeeded by French Indies Company

== 1765 dispute of market ==
The documents of 1765 throw light on a dispute of a weekly market or fair in Yanam. A weekly market used to be held here every Tuesday (Even now market occurs in Yanam on this Tuesday only). People used to come to it for purchasing all their essential commodities once a week. Neelapalli (Nélapilly), a neighboring village of Yanam was under the British at that time. It is nearly 3 kilometres away from Yanam. The people in this village also used to hold a fair on Tuesdays. Thus there was a clash of interests between Yanam and Neelapalli. After prolonged correspondence with the English authorities at Madras, the French authorities in Yanam succeeded in changing the fair of Neelapalli to another day of the week, Saturday. In this way, Yanam triumphed over its neighboring village Neelapalli.

== 1767 memoire by Lauriston ==
It is from Yanam that we get our best 'Guinness' (fine cloth). It is possible to have commerce here worth more than a million livres per year under circumstances more favorable than those in which we are placed now, but always by giving advances much earlier, which we have never been in a position to do. From this place, we also procured teakwood, oils, rice, and other grains both for the men as well as for the animals. A port from commerce, Yanam enjoyed another kind of importance. "The advantages which may be derived in a time of war from the alliances that we the French may conclude with several Rajas who sooner or later cannot fail to be dissatisfied with the English'." Although the English gained effective control over the Circars, Yanam enabled the French to enter into secret relations with the local chieftains. Yanam had some commercial importance.

— Extract from Jean Law de Lauriston's memoire on Yanaon.

Jean Law de Lauriston, Governor of Pondichéry (1765–1766) stated in his "Memoire of 1767". During that time, it was a center for the production of salt and this salt constituted the major part of the quantity imported by the French into Bengal region. It was also an important center of cotton goods and supplied a large part of the return cargo of the French ships visiting India. A few French citizens in Yanam were fully occupied by these two kinds of profitable business and they had no interest in political and administrative matters that were left entirely to the chief or commandant. Indian residents wanted nothing better than to be left in peace to carry on their trading activities.

== Second British occupation ==
During 1783 many French settlements along with Yanaon went under British occupation. There is again lack of information because of its subsequent English occupation. Yanam was restored again to the French in February 1785 and Masulipatam along with Francepeth was retroceded on 16 March 1785. The 1787 Convention between Great Britain and France on the subject of the French establishments and commerce in India mentions about the restoration of Yanaon factory to the French.

The Article IX of this convention states that,

(La factorerie d'Yanam, avec ses dependances, ayant, en exécution dudit traité de paix, été délivrée par le Sr. Guillaume Hamilton, de la part de S. M. (Note: It is an abbreviation of Sa Majesté (i.e. His Majesty)) Britannique, au Sr. Pierre- Paul Martin, de la part de S. M. T. C. (Note: It is an abbreviation of Sa Majesté Très Chrétienne (i.e. His Majesty Most Christian)) la restitution en est confirmée par la présente Convention, dans les termes de l'instrument, daté du 7 Mars 1785, et signé par les sieurs Hamilton et Martin)
(The Factory of Yanam, with its dependencies, having, in pursuance of the said treaty of peace, been delivered up by Mr. William Hamilton, on the part of his Britannic Majesty, to Mr. Peter Paul Martin, on the part of his Most Christian Majesty, the restitution thereof is consumed by the present Convention, in the terms of the instrument bearing date the seventh of March, one thousand seven hundred and eighty five, and signed by Messieurs Hamilton and Martin.).

Mr. Mallhendre took possession after the retrocession of Yanaon and Mr. Bluter succeeded him.

Preceded by French Indies Company	Second British Occupation of Yanaon; 1778–1785	Succeeded by French Colonial Empire

== During the French Revolution ==
The French Revolution had its effects in different ways in all the former French settlements. The French trade at Yanam was considerable at that time.

After Bluter, Mr. Pierre Sonnerat became chief in 1790 in Yanam. He was a scholar and writer. He had a profound interest in natural sciences. He wrote a book,Voyages aux Indes Orientales et à la Chine, in three volumes. He appreciated very much the sonority and the music of the Telugu language. He administered Yanam during the time of the French Revolution.

Sonnerat was involved in commercial businesses, along with other traders. His commercial involvement brought serious consequences to his administrative post. Petitions against him were presented to Camille Charles Leclerc, chevalier de Fresne, the then-French Governor in Pondichéry. On 5 June 1790, a Frenchman called De Mars complained about him for the first time. By that time Pondichéry, under the influence of the French Revolution, had already formed the first representative committee. But no action was taken in favor of De Mars either by the Governor or by this committee.

The slave trade that was rampant in Yanaon started diminishing due to the newly formed Colonial assembly in Pondicherry on 16 October 1792. The first article of the assembly's resolution banned slavery. M. de Bury was elected as Deputy to the Colonial assembly from Yanam in January 1793.

== Third British occupation ==
Once again French lost control over Yanam to the British in June 1793. During 1793 and 1816 Pondichéry was under British control. So, Yanam fell thrice into the hands of the British. After the Napoleonic Wars, by the Treaty of Paris (1814) Yanam along with the factory at Machilipatnam was finally returned to the French on 26 September 1816. However some French records slightly differ on the dates of return: Pondichéry and Karikal 4 December 1816, Chandernagore 14 January 1817, Yanaon 12 April 1817 and Mahé 22 February 1817. From then it was continuously under the control of French until it got independence. The third British occupation is also called as final British occupation.

Preceded by French Colonial Empire	Final British Occupation of Yanaon; 1793–1816	Succeeded by French Colonial Empire

== 1839 Cyclone ==
On 25 November 1839 a severe Cyclone occurred that was accompanied by an inundation of the sea and the town was laid to waste. The cyclone and storm surge inundation that accompanies it are referred to in the local Telugu language as Tufānu (Telugu: తుఫాను) and Uppena (Telugu: ఉప్పెన). All the official records got destroyed. It was said that the force of the wind was such as had never before been witnessed there, and the inroad of the sea was very dreadful. The factory and town suffered a loss of 1,500 inhabitants and could not recover from such a calamity for many years. To understand the scale of the loss, it was mentioned that one house at the nearby Tallarevu village in which 400 people have taken shelter was blown down and most of them killed. Also, at nearby Mallavaram village, only 19 out of 2000 inhabitants got survived. The term cyclone was coined by a British official Henry Piddington after observing cyclones, especially at Coringa which was a busy port before 1839. It was estimated that around 20,000 vessels got destroyed and 3,00,000 people lost their lives in Coringa. A 40-foot tidal wave (storm surge) hit the Coringa port. Aftermath, it was never built and today it remained a simple village.

== Anglo-French negotiations regarding the status of French India ==
After the French possessions were returned by the British to the French after the Napoleonic Wars in the early nineteenth century, the matter of these establishments and other minor lodges came into the dialogue between these two Imperial powers thrice; 1857, 1883-5, and April 1914. During the first instance in 1857, the British government wanted to secure all of French India barring Pondicherry and Karikal. Had the first occasion of negotiations succeeded then Yanaon would have been ceded to British India long back and its importance would have been relegated to oblivion like some of its nearby ancient English settlements, Injaram and Neelapalle. During the second negotiation in the 1880s, the British government tried hard to secure the extinction of French rights in the French loges in return for compensation in the region of Pondicherry. On the last occasion during the start of the First World War, the negotiations were focused more particularly on the position of Chandernagore. However, none of these three negotiations were fruitful and none of them could not reach an agreement.

== C.P. Brown connection with Yanaon ==
While the linguist C.P. Brown was working as a judge at Rajahmundry in 1834, he came to know that one Sri Majeti Sarvesalingam possessed a collection of old Telugu books. So Brown contacted the then chief de Yanaon, Capitaine de Lesparda, and requested him to arrange a meeting with Sarvesalingam. It seems he collected nearly 300 books and paid one hundred and fifty rupees for the manuscripts in the library of Majeti Sarvesalingam. Of the 613 manuscripts in this library, 386 were Sanskrit works, and the others contained works on grammar, spells (mantras), and on medicine. Also, many of Brown's manuscripts and other possessions were kept by Mulupuri Sundara Ramayya in his house at Yanaon. He charged Brown Rs. 2,316 for storage of his manuscripts and possessions and for shipping them to Madras.

== Local administration ==
=== 1840 Decree ===
Local administration was started in Yanaon by a royal decree (Ordonnance Royale) dated 23 July 1840 during July Monarchy. According to that decree, Yanaon and Mahé were Provided with a Chef de service (Service Chief) who resides in his official residence. After the merger, it is being resided by Regional Executive Officer, Yanam.

A colonial government was formed in 1840. According to Annuaire statistique des établissements français dans l'Inde- 1843 by Pierre-Constant Sicé, the details of colonial government in 1843 were,

- Gouverneur Général de établissements français dans l'Inde – De Nourquer Du Camper (Paul)
- Gouvernement Colonial de Yanaon
  - Chef de service – Jourdain (Jean-Philippe-Paul)
    - Administration – Ribeiro (Dominique-Grégoire), écrivain.
  - Service de Santé – Pithois (Pamphile), officer de santé.
  - Administration financière – Ticanny Tiramalaram, percepteur des revenues à mazulipatam.
  - Justice
    - Tribunal de prèmiere instance
      - Sicé (Eugène), procureur du Roi
      - Calmels (Jean-René-Eucher), greffier-notaire
      - Vingatramaya, interprête.
    - Police
      - P.Condaya, interprête.

=== 1871 Decree ===
According to a decree dated 1 February 1871, one person can be sent as a député to the Chambre des députés.

=== 1872 Decree ===
Another pivotal incident in local administration was a decree of 1872. It was dated 13 June 1872 and was issued during Third Republic. According to that decree, Conseil locaux (Local councils) were created at each colony. The elected member was called a Conseiller local (Local councilor). Conseil local de Yanaon had a strength of four local councilors. The term of office was 6 years with one-half of membership renewed every three years.

=== 1878 Decree ===
According to a decree dated 24 February 1878, one person can be sent as a sénateur to the Sénat (French Senate). A senator will be elected by the Conseil colonial (Colonial Council) and Conseil local (Local council). The first elections were held on 26 March 1876.

=== 1946 Decree ===
By the decree of 1946, French India (Inde française) became Overseas territory (Territoire d'outre-mer) of France. Then a Représentative de l'Inde française (Representative Assembly of French India) was created for each colony. Yanaon was provided with two assembly representatives (Equivalent to Member of the Legislative Assembly).

==== Members of Representative Assembly of French India (1946–1955) ====
- 1946: Madimchetty Satianarayanamourty; Kamichetty Sri Parassourama Varaprassada Rao Naidu,
- 1951: Madimchetty Satianarayanamourty; Canacala Tataya.

==== Members of Pondicherry Representative Assembly (1955–1963) ====
- 1955: Erra Jagannadha Rao (Congress); Kamichetty Sri Parassourama Varaprassada Rao Naidu (Congress).
- 1959: Kanakalapeta constituency: Kamichetty Savithri (Ind.); Adiandhrapeta constituency: Kamichetty Sri Parassourama Varaprassada Rao Naidu (Ind.).

During the 1959 election from the Kanakalapeta constituency, two independents secured exactly 707 votes each and so to decide the winner, lots were cast. Finally, Kamichetty Savithri was declared the winner. In the same constituency, a Congress candidate polled only 8 votes.

== Municipal administration ==
Though the French established colonies in India in the seventeenth century, it was not until the end of the 19th century they started civil administration in French India.

=== French Metropolitan Decree ===
A French Metropolitan Decree, dated 12 March 1880 adopted a six-year term of office for Mayors (Maire), municipal councilors (Conseil Municipaux), and commune panchayats (Communes). Thus French India has seen a French system of municipal administration. In the past, municipal administration was virtually the pivot of the whole administrative machinery in French India. It had several features that could serve as a role model for hassle-free administration.

Then a total of 10 communes were formed in which Yanaon became one commune with a strength of 12 Municipal Councillors (conseiller municipaux). The first municipal elections were held on 30 May 1880.

=== Structure of municipality ===
La Mairie (Town Hall) in Yanaon is now called Municipality Building. It was built in the 19th century and is situated next to Court House on Thiagaraja Street in Yanaon Town. During French colonial rule, Yanam Municipality had 12 Sièges. Then, they were called previously as Sièges instead of wards. Each ward (Siège) was represented by a municipal councilor (Conseiller Municipal). Each commune possessed a Mayor (Maire) and a Municipal council (Conseil Municipal) which managed the commune from the Mairie. The life span of a Municipal council was six years, with one-half of the membership renewed for every three years.

=== Election results of 1948 ===
Elections held on 24 October 1948 and 18 October 1954 were the most crucial in the history of French India. In June 1948 the French and Indian Governments came to an agreement as to how the future of the French Settlements should be determined.

Municipal elections were held in Pondichéry, Karikal and Yanam on 24 October 1948. The two main parties were the French India Socialist Party ([Socialist]), which favored the continuance of French rule, and the French India Congress (Congress), which favored union with India. Socialist Party was headed by Kamichetty Sri Parassourama Varaprassada Rao Naidu, a strong pro-French leader and later MLA of Yanam. and Congress Party was headed by Yerra Jaganatha Rao. Among the Independents was Madimchetty Satianandam who got later elected as mayor and performed a key role in merging of Yanam in India.

- Yanam – 12
  - Socialists – 3
  - Independents – 9

Notable Municipal Councillors were, Bezawada Bapa Naidou, Diwan Bouloussou Soubramaniam Sastroulou, Kamichetty Venougopala Rao Naidou, Samatam Krishnayya, Madimchetty Satianandam, Kamichetty Savithiry and Kamichetty Sri Parassourama Varaprassada Rao Naidu.

== Glimpse of Official Holidays ==
As per the decret dated 20 August 1947 the official holidays in French India (except Chandernagore) were given below:

S. No.	Name	Number of Holidays	Establishment
National festival
1	Fête nationale(14 July)	1	Pondichéry, Karikal, Mahé, Yanaon
Common religious festivals
2	New Year's Day (Christian)	2	Pondichéry, Karikal, Mahé, Yanaon
3	Epiphany (Christian)	1	Pondichéry, Karikal, Mahé, Yanaon
4	Mardi Gras (Christian)	1	Pondichéry, Karikal, Mahé, Yanaon
5	Good Friday and Holy Saturday (Christian)	2	Pondichéry, Karikal, Mahé, Yanaon
6	All Soul's Day (Christian)	1	Pondichéry, Karikal, Mahé, Yanaon
7	Christmas (Christian)	1	Pondichéry, Karikal, Mahé, Yanaon
8	Ramzan (Muslim)	1	Pondichéry, Karikal, Mahé, Yanaon
9	Bakrid (Muslim)	1	Pondichéry, Karikal, Mahé, Yanaon
10	Muharram (Muslim)	1	Pondichéry, Karikal, Mahé, Yanaon
11	Milad-e-Nabi (Muslim)	1	Pondichéry, Karikal, Mahé, Yanaon
11	Vinayaka Chaturthi (Hindu)	1	Pondichéry, Karikal, Mahé, Yanaon
12	Ayudha Puja (Hindu)	1	Pondichéry, Karikal, Mahé, Yanaon
13	Deepavali (Hindu)	1	Pondichéry, Karikal, Mahé, Yanaon
14	Vaikunta Ekadasi (Hindu)	1	Pondichéry, Karikal, Mahé, Yanaon
15	Pongal (Hindu)	1	Pondichéry, Karikal, Yanaon
16	Kari naal (Hindu)	1	Pondichéry, Karikal, Yanaon
17	Masi Magham (Hindu)	1	Pondichéry, Karikal, Yanaon
18	Tamil New Year's Day (Hindu)	1	Pondichéry, Karikal
19	Villianur festival (Hindu)	1	Pondichéry
20	Virampattinam festival (Hindu)	1	Pondichéry
21	Virampattinam festival (Hindu)	1	Pondichéry
22	Kandurai festival (Muslim)	1	Karaikal
23	Mango festival (Hindu)	1	Karaikal
24	Sani Pethi festival (Hindu)	1	Karaikal
25	Vishnu festival (Hindu)	1	Yanaon
26	Ugadi (Hindu)	1	Yanaon

== Yanam-Neelapalli Bridge ==
The Yanam-Neelapalli bridge also called the Yanam Bridge over the 'Ātreya branch' (Korangi) of Godavari was constructed in the early 20th century. The 2nd Viscount Goschen, then Governor of Madras Presidency laid the foundation stone for the bridge on 10 December 1927. A report of Madras presidency's administration in 1928 mentioned that Governor Goschent left Madras on 4 December 1927 to lay the foundation. Madimchetty Bapanna donated some lands leading to the bridge for road construction.

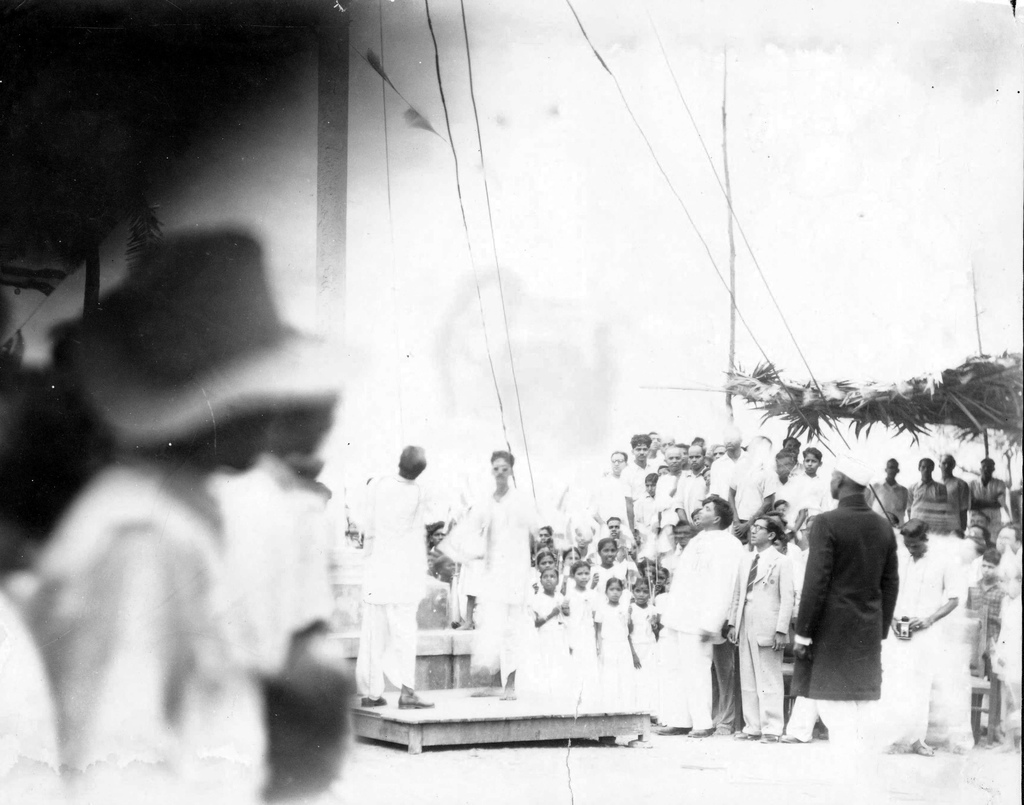
An old photo of 1954 that captured the flag hoisting ceremony aftermath the liberation of Yanaon.

== Liberation of Yanam ==
Yanam had a dominant pro-French atmosphere prevailing in its people and its leaders. In due course of time due to nationalist struggle by some leaders, conditions became intolerable in Yanam after its mayor and other representatives of Yanam adopted the merger resolution on 29 April 1954. The resolution remarked

Firmly attached and sympathetic towards the Indian Union, our Motherland, we the elected representatives of this establishment, ardently and unanimously desire the immediate integration and without a referendum of the territory of our establishment with that of the Indian Union to which our territory is tied geographically, economically, ethnically and culturally.

Later, the mayor, deputy mayor, and over 200 people took refuge in the adjacent areas of India. Police and hired hoodlums from Yanam assaulted refugees on Indian soil. On 13 June 1954, these people under the guise of civilians marched into Yanam under the leadership of Dadala Raphael Ramanayya. The then-Mayor of Yanaon, Monsieur Madimchetty Satianarayanamourty alias Satia, aided them and took over the administration. After hoisting the Indian National Flag, they formed the revolutionary provisional government of Yanam headed by Dadala Raphael Ramanayya and adopted a resolution declaring "Yanaon a Libéré" (lit. 'Yanam liberated'). The coup d'état of Yanam was announced by All India Radio and the Press.

Preceded by British Occupation	French Establishment of Yanam; 26 September 1816 – 13 June 1954	Succeeded by Provisional Government of Yanam (de facto not recognized by France until October 1954 de facto transfer agreement)
Preceded by British Occupation	French Establishment of Yanam (de facto); 26 September 1816 – 1 November 1954	Succeeded by India
Preceded by British Occupation	French Establishment of Yanam (de jure); 26 September 1816 – 16 August 1962	Succeeded by India

Then prime minister of India, Jawaharlal Nehru was annoyed by the direct involvement of Indian police in the liberation and wrote a letter to the then deputy chief minister of Andhra, Neelam Sanjeeva Reddy for immediate withdrawal of Indian armed forced from Yanam.

== Transition period (1954–1962) ==
The Yanam, coup d'état had enraged the French authorities of Pondichéry. Rumors were spread to the effect that the French government were despatching a cruiser to Yanam to capture Merger Leaders and to re-establish their authority. After the coup, the last administrator of Yanam, George Sala, was recalled by André Ménard, then Governor General of Pondichéry, in June 1954.

Dadala was also appointed as Acting Commissioner for Yanam for 14 days. Towards the end of June 1954, Sri Kewal Singh paid a visit to Yanam and requested Dadala's return to Pondichéry to continue his activities there. On 3 July, on Kewal Singh's request, Dadala left Yanam, after making all arrangements for its proper administration.

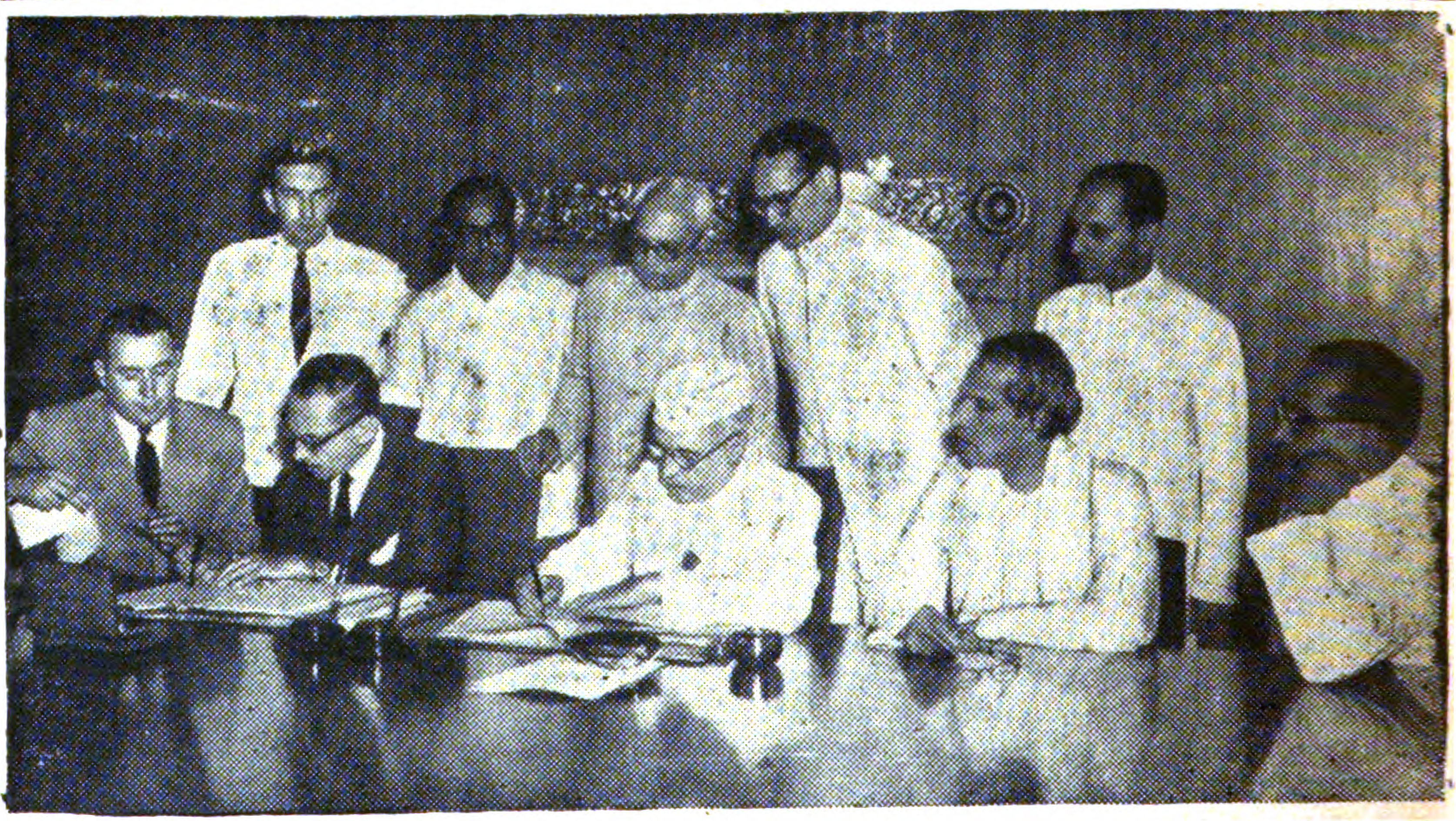
An old photo of signature of the Treaty of Cession of French Establishments of India dated 28 May 1956. Plenipotentiary Signatories: On behalf of Republic of India, treaty was signed by the Indian Minister for External Affairs, Shri Jawaharlal Nehru (seated in the centre) and On behalf of French Republic, signed by the French Ambassador in India, H. E. Monsieur Stanislas Ostroróg (seated second from the left). Then Chief Commissioner of Pondicherry, Hon'ble Kewal Singh can be seen standing second from the right.

=== De facto transfer ===
Yanam remained under French control until 13 June 1954, when it joined the Republic of India as a result of Indian military action. On 1 November 1954, after long years of the independence struggle, the four enclaves of Pondicherry, Yanam, Mahe, and Karikal were transferred de facto to India. The first High Commissioner of Pondicherry, Kewal Singh was appointed immediately after the Kizhoor referendum on 21 October 1954 as per Foreign Jurisdiction Act, 1947. The Chief Commissioner had the powers of the former French commissioner, but was under the direct control of the Union Government.

The Prime Minister, Jawaharlal Nehru visited Pondicherry on 16 January 1955. He also paid a visit to Aurobindo Ashram on the same day. Messrs Edouard Goubert, S. Perumal, Dadala and Sri Pakirisamy Pillai presented addresses to Pandit Nehru in a public meeting in the maidan of Gorimedu. Nehru assured the people of Pondicherry that the individuality of Pondicherry resulting from the influence of French institutions and culture would be preserved as windows of France and French culture.

=== 1956 Treaty of Cession ===
A treaty of cession was signed by the two countries on 28 May 1956. The de jure transfer was delayed until the end of the Algerian War. The treaty was ratified by the French parliament in May 1962. On 16 August 1962 (De Jure Day) India and France exchanged the instruments of ratification under which France ceded to India full sovereignty over the territories it held. This treaty also confirmed that France was not responsible for any events after 13 June 1954 in Yanaon and thereby indirectly accepting the liberation of Yanaon.

=== De jure transfer ===
The treaty of cession was signed by the two countries in May 1956 and ratified by the French parliament in May 1962. On 16 August 1962, India and France exchanged the instruments of ratification under which France ceded to India full sovereignty over the territories it held. Every year on 16 August, the De jure Transfer Day (Vidhitāntaraṇa Dinamu in Telugu) was celebrated nominally throughout Puducherry Union Territory. However, owing to the initiative by the Lt. Governor Kiran Bedi, this day was celebrated for the first time by the government on 16 August 2016. Until then it was merely a public holiday in Pudicherry and no official celebrations took place before 2016.

=== Merger in Puducherry U.T. ===
Pondicherry and the other enclaves of Karaikal, Mahe and Yanam came to be administered as the Union Territory of Puducherry from 1 July 1963.

== Dates of important events of the merger of French India ==
When British India became independent, French India consisted of five establishments (i.e. settlements) and twelve lodges (sites of old French factories scattered over the provinces of Madras, Bombay, Orissa in India and East Pakistan in Pakistan) (Note: The original nine are located at Calicut, Surat, Masulipatam and Francepeth, Balasore, Patna, Jougdia (submerged later), Cassimbazar and Dacca. Later ones are at Chittagong, Sylhet, Serampur and Sala). The lodges that are enclaves in Indian Union are ceded by France as a friendly gesture (par un geste d'amité (French)) on 6 October 1954 at a ceremony in Masulipatam.

The cession of those loges was just a transfer of some land involving a mere 2000 people or so. However, the cession of the five French establishments did not happen overnight and it was a gradual process that got dragged on until 1962. The only exception was Chandernagore where a plebiscite was conducted in 1949 and got merged into Indian Union soon later.

Inde française
Establishment	Liberation	Referendum	de facto transfer	Treaty of Cession	de jure transfer	Merger
Pondichéry	Partial^{†}	18 October 1954^{§}	1 November 1954	28 May 1956	16 August 1962	1 July 1963 into UT of Pondicherry
Chandernagore	N.A.	19 June 1949	2 May 1950	2 February 1951	9 June 1952	2 October 1954 into State of West Bengal
Karikal	N.A.	18 October 1954^{§}	1 November 1954	28 May 1956	16 August 1962	1 July 1963 into UT of Pondicherry
Mahé	16 June 1954	N.A.	1 November 1954	28 May 1956	16 August 1962	1 July 1963 into UT of Pondicherry
Yanaon	13 June 1954	N.A	1 November 1954	28 May 1956	16 August 1962	1 July 1963 into UT of Pondicherry

^{†} Some communes of Pondicherry were liberated. The communes of Nettapacom, Tiroubouvane were liberated on 31 March 1954 and 6 April 1954 respectively. Also, some villages of Bahour commune were liberated around the same time. In the de facto cession treaty signed in October 1954, France has recognized that they lost sovereignty of the two communes (Nettapacom and Tiroubouvane) and two establishments (Mahe and Yanam) w.e.f. from their dates of liberation.

^{§} The elected members of the Representative Assembly and the municipal councilors of Pondicherry and Karaikal participated in the referendum at Kizhoor village. A total of 178 members were present and the result of the referendum was for the merger of French Indian territories by a vote of 170 against 8. A memorial has been erected to commemorate this historic event of Kizhur referendum.

== Notable people in colonial period ==
First Laurel Poet of Andhra, Chellapilla Venkata Kavi (1870–1950), One of the duo of the famous Tirupati Venkata Kavulu lived here. Many poets such as the late Villa Reddi Naidu, V. Venkataswami Naidu. Some important politicians include Kanakala Tatayya Naidou, MD Abdul Razzaq, Majety Subbarao, and Guiry Madhavarao.

- Bezawada Bapa Naidou
- Bouloussou Soubramaniam Sastroulou
- Kamichetty Venugopala Rao Naidou
- Dadala Rafael Ramanayya
- Samatam Krouschnaya
- Kamichetty Sri Parassourama Varaprassada Rao Naidu
- Kamichetty Savithri
- Manyam Zamindar

== See also ==
- Salabat Jung
- Yanam Municipality
- Marquis de Bussy-Castelnau
- Pondicherry
- Puducherry
- French India
- Municipal Administration in French India
- Coup d'État de Yanaon
