= Rajahmundry Circar =

Rajamundry Circar
- Circar
- Country: Golconda Sultanate, Mughal Empire, Hyderabad State
- Seat: Rajahmundry

Rajahmundry Circar or Rajahmundry Sarkar was one of the five Northern Circars in the Golconda Sultanate, Deccan subah of Mughal Empire and later in the Nizam's dominion of Hyderabad. The Northern Circars were the most prominent ones in the Deccan subah. Eastern Ghats near Pentakota village were considered the northern limit of the Rajahmundry Circar while the southern limit was demarcated by the Godavari river.

== Etymology ==
During Qutb Shahi, Mughal and Nizam rule it was referred in official records with name Rājmandrī and the same name was anglicized in the British colonial era as Rajahmundry or Rajamundry. Circar was the English spelling of sarkar, a Mughal term for a district (a subdivision of a subah or province), which had been in use since the time of Sher Shah Suri (1486–1545). A sarkar was further divided into Mahals or Parganas.

== Geographical extent ==
The Eastern Ghats near Pentakota village were considered the northern limit of the Rajahmundry Circar beyond which was the Chicacole Circar. The southern limit was bounded by Ellore circar with the Godavari river demarcating the boundary. The Northern Circars were five in number: Chicacole (Srikakulam), Rajmandri (Rajahmundry), Ellore (Eluru), Mustaphanagar (Kondapalli) and Murtuzanagar (Guntur).

== Early history ==
During Vengi Chalukya era, Rajahmundry was the capital from the reign of Rajaraja Narendra, and later during Kakatiya rule it was a fort. Rajahmundry may have been among the 77 administrative territories during Kakatiya's reign. During the reign of Ghiyath al-Din Tughluq, after the fall of Kakatiyas, Rajahmundry province fell to the invading armies of Ulugh Khan (later Muhammad ibn Tughluq) around 1324AD. In the same year, one of the oldest Mosques in Madras presidency now known as Royal mosque or Pedda Masīdu (Telugu: పెద్ద మశీదు) was built here by the natives. That mosque bears still an inscription that it was built by one of the commanders of Muhammad ibn Tughluq. Later a reconquest was launched by chieftains such as Prolaya Nayaka, Prolaya Vema Reddi and liberated this province from Tughlaq rule. Vilasa grant of Prolaya Nayaka discovered near Pithapuram (Note: Pithapuram is an ancient city. it was the capital city of Eastern Chalukyas before they shifted to Vengi (Now known as Pedavegi) and finally to Rajahmundry.) gave valuable insight into the situation of Telangana (including Andhra Pradesh) (Note: Until medieval ages the names 'Telangana' and 'Andhra' both used to name the Telugu lands. While the latter is much ancient name that was existing even during the Vedic era, the former name is a portmanteau of Telanga (Telugu: తెలంగ, lit. 'Telugu') and āṇemu (Telugu: ఆణెము, lit. 'land'). However, in due course of time, the current Telangana remained under different Muslim dynasties until 1948 and the current Andhra Pradesh got gradually absorbed by the British Raj. At first, the Northern Circars got ceded to them by Nizams during the mid-eighteenth century, and Ceded districts, now referred to as Rayalaseema got ceded after a few decades. Even today one of the dominant agricultural castes is referred to as Telaga. During the French rule, the people of Kapu caste in the French colony of Yanam have been referred to in the French official records as Telinga.) aftermath of the fall of Kakatiyas and mentions the ordeals faced by the people during Tughluq rule. Later, Rajahmundry was ruled by Reddies. During their rule, Rajahmundry was first a sub-capital (Upa-Rājadhāni) and later became the capital town. Later it passed to the Gajapatis of Orissa.

== Gajapati Era ==
Rajahmundry was retroceded by Srikrishnadevaraya of Vijayanagara Empire to the Hindu rulers in Orissa, the Gajapatis as part of a peace treaty after his successful conquest of eastern provinces in 1512. After a martial alliance with Gajapatis, Krishandevaraya returned all the lands that the Vijayanagara Empire had captured north of the Krishna River; this made the Krishna River the boundary between the Vijayanagara Empire and Gajapati Kingdom. During Gajapati era, Rajahmundry was then organized as a Daṇḍapāṭa (Telugu: దండపాట) (Note: A Daṇḍapāṭa is an administrative unit under a Daṇḍa-parīkṣā or Daṇḍanāyaka in the Oriyan historical records) with 21 Sthalās (rough equivalent to Parganas).

The 21 Sthalās of Rajahmundry Rājya or Daṇḍapāṭa during Gajapati era were 1. Palnāḍu (Prōlanāḍu or Pithapuram), 2. Bōḍasakur̥r̥u, 3. Ponnāḍu (Ponnada), 4. Nandipūḍikoṭṭām, 5. Kimmūru (Peddapuram), 6. Bikkavōlu, 7. Ītakoṭa, 8. kōrukonḍa, 9. Araṭlakōṭa, 10. Cōḍavaram, 11. Viñjavaram, 12. Murumaḷḷa, 13. Cāgalnāḍu, 14. Mollēru, 15. Rājupūḍu, 16. Sarvasiddhi, 17. Rāyavaram, 18. Kākināḍa, 19. Salapāka (Selapaka), 20. Tāḷḷapāka (Tatipaka), and 21. Kōṭa. Each of these sthalas had a Sthala Karaṇam (Telugu: స్థల కరణం) who maintained the accounts and held the title pātra.

Each of these Sthalās are further divided into some revenue villages referred to as grāmās.

== Qutb Shahi Era ==
The administration during the Golconda Sultanate could be traced back to the provincial divisions as arranged in the erstwhile Bahmani sultanate and Tughluqs. During the Tughluq era, the Deccan provinces were divided into four provinces called shiqs, which the later Bahmanis referred to as tarafs, lit. directions. (Note: Bahman Shah continued the Tughluq administrative system but his son Muhammad Shah brought the modifications such as changing shiqs to tarafs.) Each of these tarafs was divided into sarkars. Similarly, each sarkar is organized into parganas and each pargana into villages, also referred to as mauzes. Even after Bahmani sultanate disintegrated into the Deccan sultanates this administrative arrangement continued.

During Qutb Shahi era, Rajahmundry sarkar was existing and had 24 paraganas.

== Mughal Era ==
The Mughals annexed the Golconda Sultanate during the late seventeenth century in 1687 and organized it as Subah of Deccan. Rajahmundry was one of the 22 sarkars within that Subah. The Suba of Deccan (or Hyderabad) was also divided into two administrative regions, Farkhurda Bunyad Hyderabad and the Karnatak Hyderabad. The latter was popularly referred to as Carnatic during the British Raj and was further divided into Balaghaut and Painghaut regions. The sarkars of the Farkhunda Bunyad Suba Hyderabad are 1. Muhammadnagar (Golconda), 2. Kolas (Kaulas), 3. Khammamet (Khammam), 4. Koilkonda, 5. Kanlore, 6. Devarkonda (Devarakonda), 7. Nalgonda, 8. Bhongir, 9. Pangal (Panagal), 10. Merak (Medak), 11. Malangur (Molangur), 12. Mustafanagar (Kondapalli), 13. Ellore (Eluru), 14. Rajmundry (Rajamahendravaram), 15. Elgandal (Karimnagar), 16. Warrangal (Warangal), 17. Machlipattan (Machilipatnam), 18. Nizam Pattan (Nizampatnam), 19. Shikakol (Srikakulam), 20. Murtazanagar (Kondaveedu).

During the Mughal era there 17 parganas comprising 24 mahals. It can be noted that the terms Mahal and Pargana have been used interchangeably. However, there is an important difference between these two terms. (Note: A pargana denoted a fiscal-cum-territorial unit comprising some number of villages and was under a Faujdar. On the contrary, a Mahal is purely fiscal unit. A pargana might include more than one mahal and not vice versa.)

Information about the list of the parganas are available from Sawānih-i-Deccan, a Persian work compiled by Munīm Khan, a military commander during the era of Asaf Jah II. The parganas of Rajahmundry sarkar are 1.Haveli Rajahmundry, 2.Arnalwarikonda, 3.Agarhar-o-sarwar, 4.Palawal (Palivela), 5.Borsakur, 6.Belhapur, 7.Chirlapalli, 8.Chankalinar (Chagalanadu), 9.Choddarham (Chodavaram), 10.Dudilodi, 11.Salwarikota Wokripalli, 12.Ainkota (Ithakota/Enugula Mahal), 13.Karkonda (Korukonda), 14.Kalibaradsowalbar, 15.Palwarikota, 16. Karmor (Peddapuram) and 17.Molair (Mulleru). During Mughal and Nizam rule the word Haveli implied capital or headquarters of a Circar.

Other resources to know about the administration divisions during the Mughal rule and early Nizam rule were Dastūr-al-amal-e-shāhanshāhi (1781) by Munshī Thākur Lāl, and Deh-be-dehi (c.1705) by Md. Shafīq.

== British Era ==
The British assumed direct administration of the Northern Circars in 1769 which was later merged within the Madras Presidency. The British records mention that the Rajahmundry Circar had 17 Parganas when they have acquired but many additional territorial dependencies were added either by conquest or policy. Also, they mention that very few of the original 17 can be traced during their time.

A partial list of parganas mentioned by English resident at Injeram during 1794 include Mandapeta, Nidadavolu, Biccavolu, Tuni, Vellakota, Changalnanda, Cadeam, Pithapuram, Itakota, Catrevukona, Moomidivaram, Peruru, Tatipaka, Peravaram, Vanapally, Achanta, Aravilly, Injaram and Narasapuram.

Later the British have reorganized this circar as Godavari district within the Madras Presidency. Rajahmundry town was made the headquarters of Godavari District but the Collector shifted to Kakinada in 1859. An alphabetical list of villages and Taluks were prepared during British era for whole Madras presidency.
