= Georgepeta =

- Village
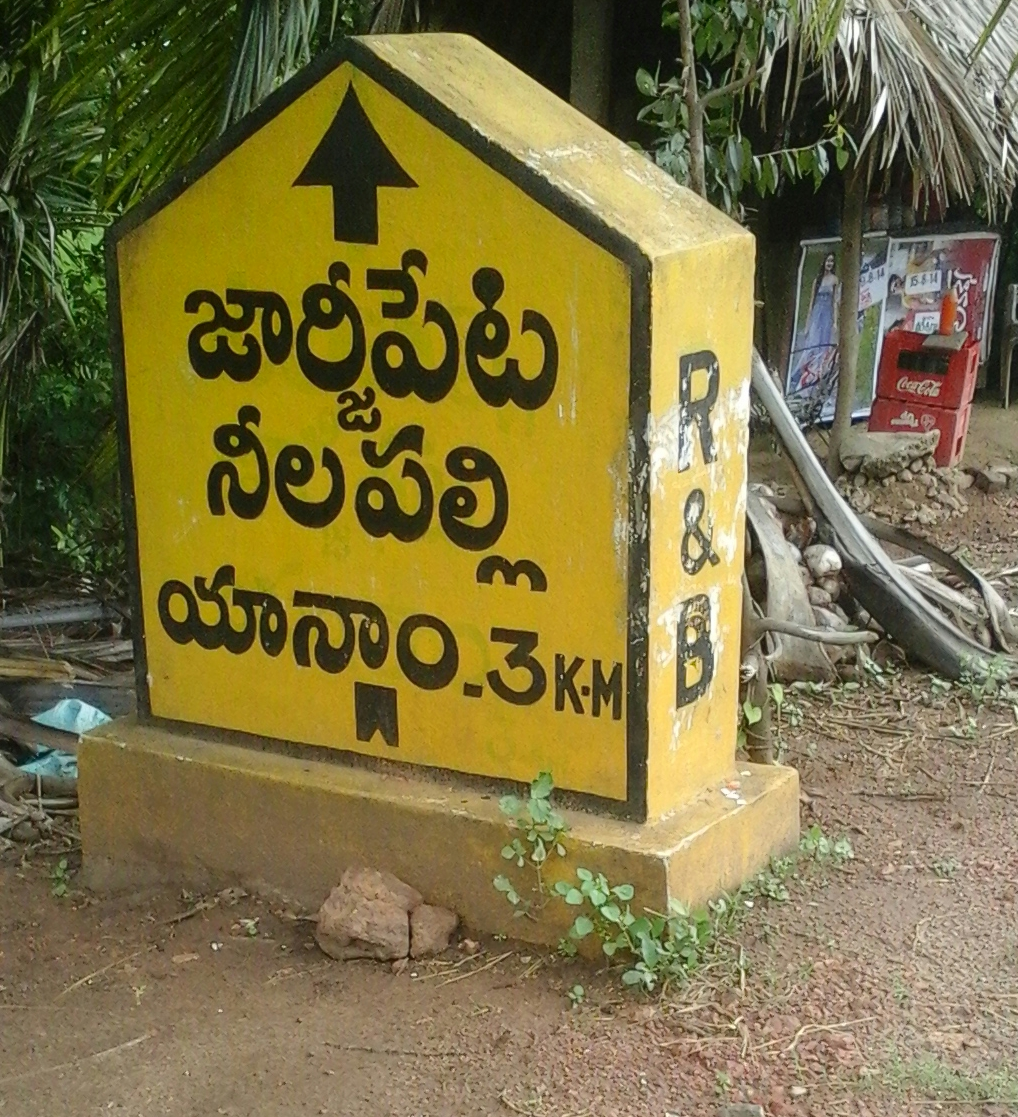
- A R&B Sign board indicating Yanam, Nelapalli and Georgepeta Villages near Y-Junction
- Interactive map of Georgepeta
- Location in Andhra Pradesh, India Georgepeta (India)
- Coordinates: 16.743551°N 82.224371°E
- Country: India
- State: Andhra Pradesh
- District: Kakinada

Languages
  - Official: Telugu
- Time zone: UTC+5:30 (IST)
- PIN: 533464
- Telephone code: 0884
- Vehicle registration: AP 05
- Lok Sabha constituency: Amalapuram
- Vidhan Sabha constituency: Mummidivaram

Georgepeta is the major panchayath village in Thallarevu mandal in Kakinada district, Andhra Pradesh.
