= Jean Law de Lauriston =

Jean Law, Marquis de Lauriston (5 October 1719 – 16 July 1797) was a French military officer and colonial administrator. He served twice as Governor General of Pondicherry under the French Colonial Empire.

Law was a nephew of the financier John Law, who founded the Banque Générale and in 1719 had helped re-finance the French Indies companies. His brother was Jacques Law, who had commanded French troops during the Siege of Trichinopoly (1751–1752) during the Second Carnatic War.

Law’s son was the general and diplomat Jacques Lauriston.

== Colonial career ==
=== Prior to 1759 ===
Jean Law was Chief Factor at the French Factory at Kasimbazar in Bengal during the Seven Years' War.

After the capture of Chandernagar, the main French trading settlement in Bengal, by British forces in March 1757 and the Battle of Plassey in June the same year, he was forced to temporarily flee Bengal with a small force of French and sepoy troops.

=== 1759 to 1761- In the Court of Shah Alam II during the Bengal War ===
In 1759, Shah Alam II had been exiled from Delhi due to usurpation by the vizier Imad ul-Mulk, who had already blinded and deposed one emperor and murdered another (Alam's father). Shah Alam took to "travelling the Ganges plains", raising troops and funds to reconquer the capital, and had raised around 20,000 followers by December 1759 when Jean de Lauriston came across his army as it approached the borders of Bengal from the west. Law decided to join Shah Alam, contributing approximately 300 troops (100 Frenchmen and 200 sepoys) to the growing army. In return, he was appointed Mir Atish (Master of the Mughal Artillery), an honorary role at the time since the army did not yet have a single cannon.

Jean Law served as an adviser and artillery captain to Shah Alam until the Battle of Helsa on January the 15th 1761, which ended with a complete rout of the Mughal army and Law's capture.

Law bravely fought the English, and for some time his small unit managed to withstand their immense numerical superiority. At last, finding himself abandoned by his troops, he "bestrode" one of his cannons with his sword drawn, "waiting for the moment of death". John Carnac, the EIC commander, was moved by his bravery, and approached Law on foot, pleading with him to surrender. Law replied that he would surrender, but only on the condition that he could keep his sword, since being disarmed was 'a shame he would never submit to'. The English accepted and he was amicably taken into captivity.

=== Governor of Pondicherry ===
After the Treaty of Paris (1763), Pondicherry, which had been captured and largely razed during the Seven Years' War, was returned to France. In 1765 Jean Law was made Governor General and sent to rebuild the ruined town on the old foundations. He was aided by dubashes (interpreters) and some Rajas in procuring finances, and after five months 200 European and 2000 Tamil houses had been erected.

=== Transfer of Yanaon ===
Another significant event in the life of Lauriston was the re-transfer of Yanam to the French. A document dated 15 May 1765 showed that the villages of Yanam and Kapulapalem, with certain other lands, had been ceded by John Hill and George Dolben, two Britons acting as agents for John Pybus, the head of the British settlement in Masulipatam. They had negotiated a deal (for taking over the villages) with Jean-Jacques Panon, the French commissioner, who was Jean Law de Lauriston's deputy when he was Governor General of Pondicherry. The 1765 document mentions that France entered into possession of Yanam and its dependent territories with exemption from all export and import duties.

=== Memoire of 1767 ===
Jean Law de Lauriston wrote Mémoires sur quelques affaires de l’Empire Mogol 1756-1761 which can be found in "Libraires de la Société de l'histoire des colonies françaises" Paris.

In 1768, Jean Law de Lauriston referred to the Pillai-Pari family, one of the local polygars of the Carnatic, in private letters diplomatically as Princes de Durgam. His policy of befriending the local Rajas, Polygars and chieftains could have created stronger ties with French interests in East India, and improve French finances in trade and commerece.

He stated in his "Memoire of 1767" as “It is from Yanam that we get out best ‘guiness’ (fine cloth). It is possible to have a commerce here worth more than a million livres per year under circumstances more favorable than those in which we are placed now, but always by giving advances much earlier, which we have never been in a position to do. From this place we also procured teakwood, oils, rice and other grains both for the men as well as for the animals. Apart from commerce, Yanam enjoyed another kind of importance. The advantages which may be derived in a time of war from the alliances that we the French may conclude with several Rajas who sooner or later cannot fail to be dissatisfied with the English. Although the English gained an effective control over the Circars, Yanam enabled the French to enter into secret relations with the local chieftains. Yanam had some commercial importance".

== Death ==
Law died in Paris on July 16, 1797. Lawspet, a village in Puducherry, still carries his name today.

His son, Jacques Lauriston, became a general in the French army during the Napoleonic Wars as well as ambassador to Russia in the years 1811 to 1812, and was later made marquis under the restored monarchy.

Government offices
| Preceded by First British Occupation (January 16, 1761 - June 25, 1765) | Gouverneur Général de l'Inde française 1765–1766 | Succeeded by Antoine Boyellau |
| Preceded by Antoine Boyellau | Gouverneur Général de l'Inde française 1767–January 1777 | Succeeded by Guillaume de Bellecombe, Seigneur de Teirac |
