= The Revolution and the French Establishments in India =

The Revolution and the French Establishments in India (1790 - 1793)
- First edition
- Editor: Arghya Bose
- Translator: Arghya Bose, Sandhia Vasseur
- Language: English
- Genre: History/Political philosophy
- Publisher: Setu Prakashani
- Publication date: 2019
- Publication place: India
- Media type: Print (paperback)

The Revolution and the French Establishments in India (1790 - 1793) (2019) is a historical book edited by Indian writer Arghya Bose and co-translated by Arghya Bose and Sandhia Vasseur. It recounts the tumultuous events that closely followed in the French colonies of Pondicherry, Chandannagar, Mahé, Karaikal, and Yanaon after the French Revolution in metropolitan France.

== See also ==
- French India
- French colonial empire
- French Revolution
- History of French India
