= Pondicherry Airport =

Airport in Puducherry, India

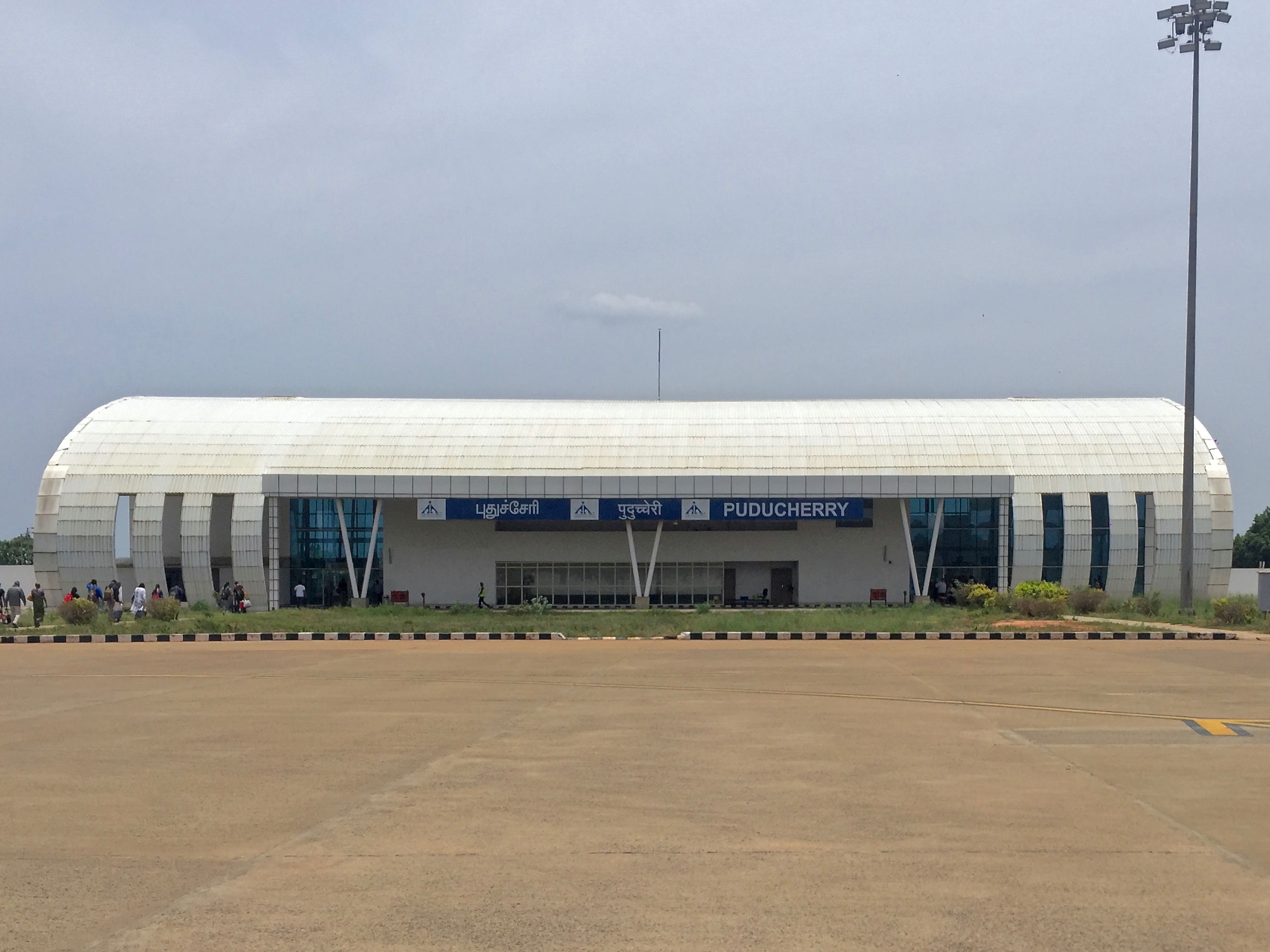
- IATA: PNY; ICAO: VOPC

Summary
- Airport type: Public
- Owner: Airports Authority of India
- Operator: Airports Authority of India
- Serves: Puducherry
- Location: Lawspet, Puducherry, India
- Opened: 1989; 37 years ago
- Elevation AMSL: 41 m (135 ft)
- Coordinates: 11°58′00″N 79°48′52″E
- Website: Puducherry Airport

Map
- Location within Puducherry Location within India

Runways
Direction	Length		Surface
Direction	m	ft	Surface
07/25	1,500	4,500	Asphalt

Statistics (April 2025 - March 2026)
- Passengers: 1,02,635 (▲200.2%)
- Aircraft movements: 1,497 (▲23.1%)
- Cargo tonnage: 0 ( 0%)
- Source: AAI

Pondicherry Airport (IATA: PNY, ICAO: VOPC) is a domestic airport serving the union territory of Puducherry, India. It is located at Lawspet, situated 8.1 km (5.0 mi) from the international community of Auroville. The airport has scheduled flights and operations of the local flying training school. In 2007, the Government of Puducherry decided to expand the airport to accommodate larger aircraft and commissioned a new terminal building. The new terminal was inaugurated on 18 January 2013, with the arrival of a SpiceJet flight from Bangalore. After a gap of three years, the airport was operationalised again under the UDAN scheme in August 2017, with daily flights to Hyderabad and Bangalore.

On 18 August 2024, Defence Minister Rajnath Singh inaugurated a Coast Guard Air Enclave (CGAE) at the airport. A HAL Dhruv and HAL Chetak squadron will be based at the CGAE.

== History ==
The airport was constructed in 1989. Between that year and 1991, regional airline Vayudoot flew to Madras, Neyveli, and Bangalore, however the flights were not successful and all were ended. The airport remained in disuse for the following two decades.

In June 2007, a memorandum of understanding (MoU) was signed between the local government and the Airports Authority of India (AAI) for expansion of the airport. For the first phase, 19.92 hectares of land were acquired at ₹ 18.95 crore. Then the new terminal was constructed and the runway extended by 260 m (853 ft), allowing for the landing of ATR aircraft. This phase was completed in late 2012. The second phase of expansion involves acquiring 200 more acres of land to extend the runway by an additional 1,100 m (3,609 ft), allowing larger jet aircraft to land at the airport. The new terminal was inaugurated with the arrival of a SpiceJet Bombardier Dash 8 Q400 aircraft on 17 January 2013 from Bangalore. However, this daily service lasted for only a little over one year as the airline withdrew the flight citing low number of passengers. The following year, the airport once again was brought back into operation when Alliance Air commenced flights from Bangalore on 14 April 2015, subsidised by the Pondicherry Government. These flights were suspended six months later due to "payment issues".

In October 2016, the Pondicherry government signed a Tripartite MoU with the Ministry of Civil Aviation (MoCA) and AAI in New Delhi to operationalise the airport under the Regional Connectivity Scheme. Subsequently, SpiceJet was awarded the Hyderabad-Pondicherry route under the scheme in March 2017 and the airline commenced operations from 16 August 2017. SpiceJet later resumed its flight to Bangalore from Pondicherry in February 2018.

== Structure ==
Puducherry Airport has one asphalt runway, oriented 07/25, 1500 m long and 30 m wide. It has a 100 m by 150 m apron and its new terminal building can handle 300 passengers during peak hours. Navigational aids at Puducherry include an aerodrome beacon. Currently land is being acquired to extend the runway and accommodate larger aircraft to increase flight services and open the airport for international flights.

== Airlines and destinations ==
Airlines	Destinations	Refs.
IndiGo	Bengaluru, Hyderabad, Rajahmundry	

== Demands ==
There are also demands to operate direct flight services between Puducherry to Mumbai, Delhi and Goa.
