= Alipur Patti =

Village in Uttar Pradesh, India

- Village
- Location in Uttar Pradesh, India
- Coordinates: 27.31052°N 79.16737°E
- Country: India
- State: Uttar Pradesh
- District: Mainpuri
- Tehsil: Bhongaon

Area
  - Total: 8.74 km^{2} (3.37 sq mi)

Population (2011)
  - Total: 7,125
  - Density: 815/km^{2} (2,110/sq mi)
- Time zone: UTC+5:30 (IST)

Alipur Patti (Alīpur Paṭṭī) is a village in Sultanganj block of Mainpuri district, Uttar Pradesh. It is right next to the related village of Ali Khera. Formerly the seat of a pargana, Alipur Patti dates back to at least the late 1500s. As of 2011, it has a population of 7,125, in 1,138 households.

== Geography ==
Alipur Patti is located about 14 km northeast of Mainpuri, the district headquarters. It adjoins the village of Ali Khera. One road connects the village to Chhachha, and another connects it to the Mota railway station.

== History ==
Alipur Patti was listed in the Ain-i Akbari (c. 1595) as a mahal under sarkar Kannauj. It was listed with an assessed revenue of 1,153,632 dams and was expected to supply 500 infantry and 20 cavalry to the Mughal army. Pargana Alipur Patti remained in existence until the 20th century.

As of 1901, Alipur Patti had a population of 2,116, and it had a village school. Either it or neighbouring Ali Khera, or both, had a decent trade in hides and blankets and manufactured leather buckets that were used in irrigation.

== Demographics ==
As of 2011, Alipur Patti had a population of 7,125, in 1,138 households. This population was 52.5% male (3,740) and 47.5% female (3,385). The 0-6 age group numbered 1,003 (527 male and 476 female), or 14.1% of the total population. 1,177 residents were members of Scheduled Castes, or 16.5% of the total.

The 1981 census recorded Alipur Patti as having a population of 4,769 people, in 811 households.

The 1961 census recorded Alipur Patti as comprising 8 hamlets, with a total population of 3,345 people (1,769 male and 1,576 female), in 630 households and 551 physical houses. The area of the village was given as 2,025 acres and it had a medical practitioner at that point.

== Infrastructure ==
As of 2011, Alipur Patti had 2 primary schools and 1 maternity and child welfare centre. Drinking water was provided by hand pump and tube well; there were no public toilets. The village did had a post office but no public library; there was at least some access to electricity for all purposes. Streets were made of both kachcha and pakka materials.
