= Ali Khera =

Village in Uttar Pradesh, India

- Village
- Location in Uttar Pradesh, India
- Coordinates: 27.31582°N 79.16389°E
- Country: India
- State: Uttar Pradesh
- District: Mainpuri
- Tehsil: Bhongaon

Area
  - Total: 22.275 km^{2} (8.600 sq mi)

Population (2011)
  - Total: 9,467
  - Density: 425.0/km^{2} (1,101/sq mi)
- Time zone: UTC+5:30 (IST)
- PIN: 205262

Ali Khera (Alī Kheṛā) is a large village in Sultanganj block of Mainpuri district, Uttar Pradesh. Located right next to the village of Alipur Patti, it hosts a weekly market. As of 2011, it has a population of 9,467, in 1,476 households.

== Geography ==
Ali Khera is located about 14 km northeast of Mainpuri, the district headquarters. It adjoins the village of Alipur Patti. One road connects the two villages to Chhachha, and another connects them to the Mota railway station.

== History ==
As of 1901, Ali Khera had a population of 2,492, and it had a post office. Either it or neighbouring Alipur Patti, or both, had a decent trade in hides and blankets and manufactured leather buckets that were used in irrigation.

== Demographics ==
As of 2011, Ali Khera had a population of 9,467, in 1,476 households. This population was 52.7% male (4,987) and 47.3% female (4,480). The 0-6 age group numbered 1,376 (714 male and 662 female), or 14.5% of the total population. 1,465 residents were members of Scheduled Castes, or 15.5% of the total.

The 1961 census recorded Ali Khera as comprising 9 hamlets, with a total population of 3,940 people (2,112 male and 1,821 female), in 778 households and 585 physical houses. The area of the village was given as 2,449 acres.

== Economy ==
Ali Khera hosts a market once per week, on Tuesdays. The market mainly deals in grain, cloth, and goats. As of 1961, it had an average weekly attendance of 2,500.

== Infrastructure ==
As of 2011, Ali Khera had 5 primary schools and 1 primary health centre. Drinking water was provided by tap, well, and hand pump; there were no public toilets. The village had a post office and public library, as well as at least some access to electricity for residential and agricultural purposes. Streets were made of both kachcha and pakka materials.
