= Neelapalle =

- village
- Interactive map of Neelapalle
- Coordinates: 16.737943°N 82.228761°E
- Country: India
- State: Andhra Pradesh
- District: Kakinada
- Elevation: 8 m (26 ft)

Population
  - Total: 4,540

Languages
  - Official: Telugu
- Time zone: UTC+5:30 (IST)
- PIN: 533464
- Telephone code: 0884
- Vehicle registration: AP 05
- Nearest city: Yanam
- Lok Sabha constituency: Amalapuram
- Vidhan Sabha constituency: Mummidivaram
- Climate: hot (Köppen)

Neelapalle is the major panchayat village in Thallarevu mandal in Kakinada district.
