= Antoine Boyellau =

Indian diplomat

Antoine Boyellau was Governor General of Pondicherry under the French East India Company.

== Titles Held ==
Government offices
Preceded by Jean Law de Lauriston	Gouverneur Général de l'Inde française 1766–1767	Succeeded by Jean Law de Lauriston
