= Pethuchettypet =

Pethuchettypet is a village in Lawspet assembly constituency and Oulgaret (Uzhavarkarai) municipality, Puducherry, India.

== Religious buildings ==
- Mariamman Temple
- Murugar Temple
- SakthiVel Temple
- Vinayagar Temple
- Ponni Amman Temple
- Vachani Amman Temple

== Educational institutions ==
- Govt. Primary School
- Pandit Duraisamy Government High School
- Sithanandha Higher Secondary School
