= Sawanih-i-Deccan =

18th Century Hyderabadi Persian Manuscript

Sawānih-i-Deccan (News of Deccan) was a work compiled by Munim Khan al-Hamdani al-Aurangabadi in 1197 A.H. (1782 A.D.). It is an unpublished manuscript in Persian and gives statistics of revenue accounts of the six subas of the Deccan with a historical account of the Asaf Jahis or Nizams of Hyderabad. Munim Khan was a military commander during the regime of Asaf Jah II. This work gave more insight about the regime of Asaf Jahis between 1724 A.D. and 1783 A.D. It also describes the administrative divisions and revenue of the Mughal Deccan during the last years of Aurangzeb's regime. A detailed list of Sarkars, Mahals (Parganas) and Villages along with their revenue was mentioned.

The two manuscript copies of this work are preserved in Hyderabad. First one is in Andhra Pradesh State Archives under manuscript number 22 and second one is in Oriental Manuscript Library and Research, Institute.

Other resources to know about the administration divisions during the Mughal rule and early Nizam rule were Dastūr-al-amal-e-shāhanshāhi (1781) by Munshī Thākur Lāl, and Deh-be-dehi (c.1705) by Md. Shafīq.

== See also ==
- Hyderabad State
- Rajamundry Sarkar
