= Northern Circars =

Division of British India's Madras Presidency

- Division of British India
- 1823–1947
- Flag

- The Northern Circars shortly after their occupation by the British
- Capital: Eluru
- Area
  - Coordinates: 17.45°N 83.00°E
  - 1823: 78,000 km^{2} (30,000 sq mi)
- Government
  - Type: British colonial government
- Historical era: 20th century
  - The British buy the rights over the Circars: 1823
  - Independence of India: 1947
Preceded by	Succeeded by
Mughal Empire	Republic of India
- Today part of: India

The Northern Circars (also spelt Sarkars) was a division of British India's Madras Presidency. It consisted of a narrow slip of territory lying along the western side of the Bay of Bengal from 15° 40′ to 20° 17′ north latitude, in the present-day Indian states of Andhra Pradesh and Odisha. The Subah of Deccan (Hyderabad/Golconda) consisted of 22 circars. These northern circars were five in number and the most prominent ones in the Subah.

They became British in a protracted piecemeal process lasting from 1758 to 1823, involving diplomacy and financial settlements rather than military conquest. The annexation by the British of the Northern Circars deprived Hyderabad State, the Nizam's dominion, of the considerable coastline it formerly had, assuming the shape it is now remembered for - that of a landlocked princely state with territories in Central Deccan, bounded on all sides by British India.

== Etymology ==
Circar was an English spelling of sarkar, a Mughal term for district (a subdivision of a subah or province), which had been in use since the time of Sher Shah Suri (1486–1545). "Northern Circars" meant the northern districts of the Nizam's dominion.

Eventually "Circar" also acquired the meaning of "British Sarkar", i.e., the British government. Hence, "Sarkar districts" could also be understood as the districts under the administration of the British government. In British maps, the area might just be labelled "Circars".

== Geography ==
The Northern Circars were five in number: Chicacole (Srikakulam), Rajmandri (Rajahmundry), Ellore (Eluru), Mustaphanagar (Kondapalli), and Murtuzanagar (Guntur). These covered a total area of about 78,000 square kilometres (30,000 sq mi) when Nizam initially lost control of them to the European colonizers.

The region at various points of time corresponded to the northern and the central parts of Coastal Andhra region of Andhra Pradesh, including the whole of present-day districts of Guntur, Bapatla, Palnadu, NTR district, Krishna, Eluru, East Godavari, West Godavari, Konaseema, Kakinada, Alluri Sitharama Raju, Anakapalli, Visakhapatnam, Vizianagaram, Parvathipuram Manyam and Srikakulam. It also included parts of the present day Prakasam district of Andhra Pradesh, Ganjam, Gajapati, Rayagada, Koraput, Nabarangapur and Malkangiri districts of Odisha and parts of the Mulugu and Kothagudem districts of Telangana.

== History ==
The region was invaded by the Bahmani Sultanate in 1471; in 1541 the Qutb Shahi conquered and extended their conquests over the Guntur and Masulipatnam districts. They appear to have acquired only an imperfect possession of the country, as it was again wrested from Balram Dev I, the ruling Jeypore king and his several feudal lords. The conquest was finally completed in 1571, during the reign of Ibrahim Quli Qutb Shah of Golconda and Hyderabad.

In 1674, Vishwambhar Dev of Jeypore kingdom defeated the Faujdar of Chicacole, appointed by the Qutb Shahi Sultans and claimed an independent semi-monarchy over the Circars. Aurangzeb conquered Golconda in 1687 and the Circars along with the Qutb Shahi Sultanate were annexed to the extensive empire of Aurangzeb. However, the first two Faujdars appointed by the Mughals were defeated and slain in the battlefield by the Maharaja of Jeypore, Raghunath Krishna Dev, who continued to rule claiming independent control over the region until he died in 1708. The successor of Raghunath Krishna proved to be an inefficient ruler and as a result lost a vast territory of the Circars. However, the kings of Jeypore continued to rule their decreased kingdom independently until the advent of the British in 1777. The British destroyed the fort of Jeypore and granted them a demoted status of a Zamindari.

In 1724, Mir Qamar-ud-din Khan was appointed the governor of Hyderabad, with the title Nizam al Mulk. He came to be known as the Nizam of Hyderabad, its de facto ruler. The fourth Nizam Salabat Jang, a son of the Nizam al Mulk, who was indebted for his elevation to the throne to the French East India Company, granted the district of Kondavid (in the Guntur district) to the French in return for their services, and soon afterwards granted the other circars as well. In 1759, through the conquest of the fortress of Masulipatnam, the maritime provinces from the river Gundlakamma to the Chilka Lake were transferred from the French to the British. But the British left them under the administration of the Nizam, except Masulipatnam, a valuable port, which was retained by the British.

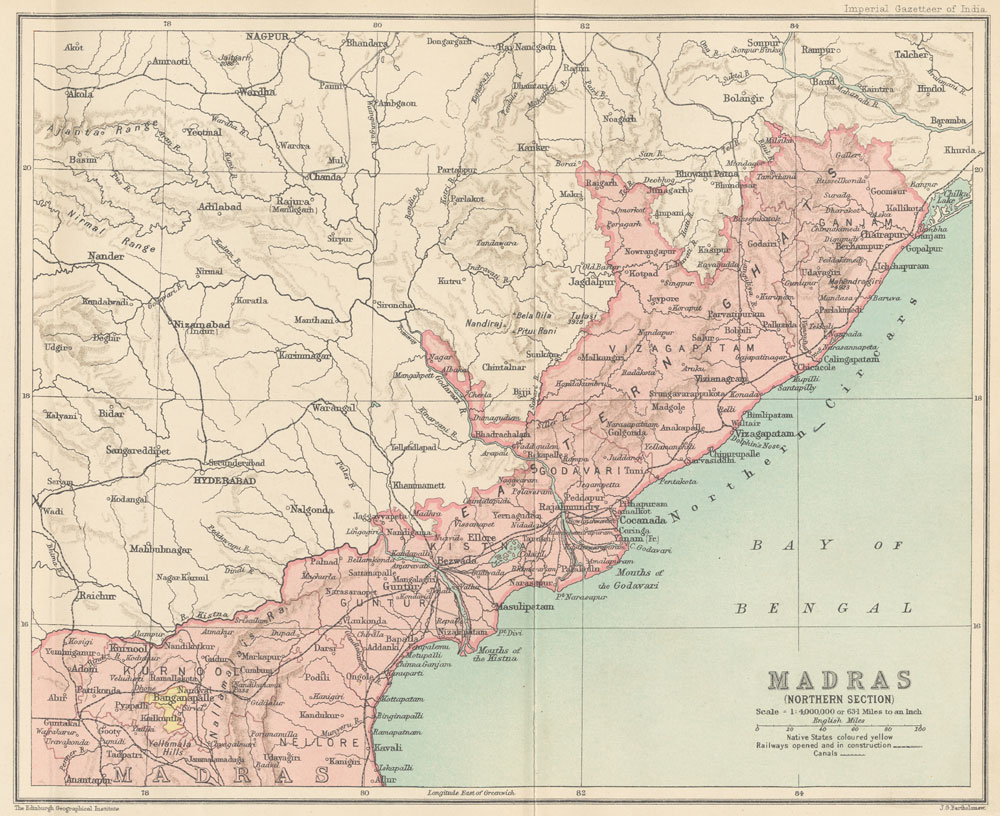
The Northern Circars in 1909

In 1765, Lord Robert Clive obtained from the Mughal emperor Shah Alam II a grant of the five Circars. The fort of Kondapalli was seized by the British as an opening move. On 12 November 1766, a treaty of alliance was signed with Nizam Ali Khan by which the British undertook to maintain troops for Nizam's assistance. By a second treaty, often referred to as the Treaty of Masulipatnam, signed on 1 March 1768, the Nizam acknowledged the validity of Shah Alam's grant and resigned the Circars to the British East India Company, receiving as a mark of friendship an annuity of £50,000. Guntur, as the personal estate of the Nizam's brother Basalat Jang, was excepted from British rule during his lifetime under both treaties. He died in 1782, but it was not till 1788 that Guntur came under British administration. Finally, in 1823, the claims of the Nizam over the Northern Circars were bought outright by the company, and they became a British possession.

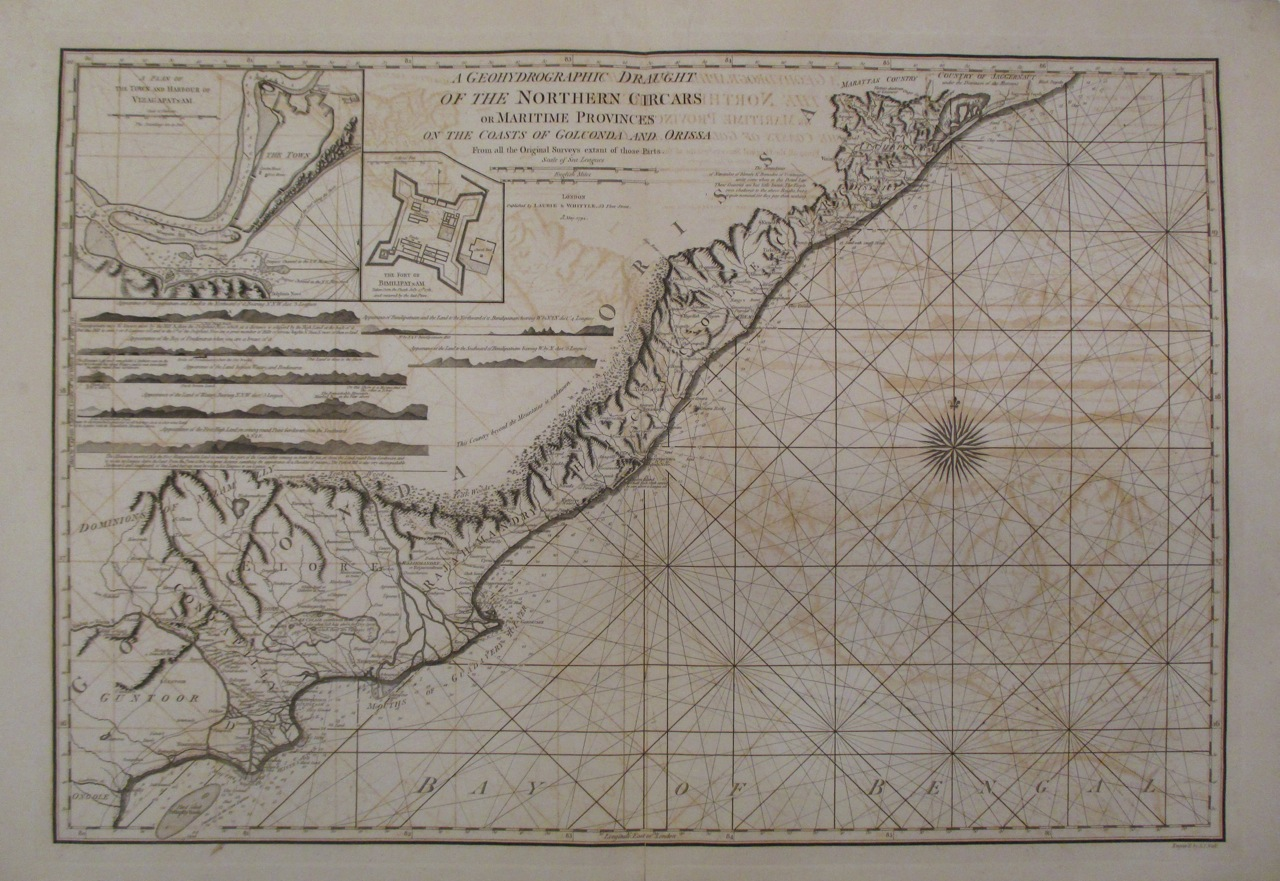
The Geohydrographic Draught of North Circars

The Northern Circars were governed as part of Madras Presidency until India's independence in 1947, after which the presidency became India's Madras State. The northern, Telugu-speaking portion of Madras state, including the Northern Circars, was detached in 1953 to form a new 'Andhra State'. The Andhra State was merged with the Telugu-speaking parts of Hyderabad State in 1956 to form a united Andhra Pradesh. The two were bifurcated again in 2014 as Andhra Pradesh and Telangana.

== See also ==
- Rajamundry Sarkar
