= Ithakota =

Ethakota
- village
- Interactive map of Ethakota
- Location in Andhra Pradesh, India Ethakota (India)
- Coordinates: 16.7192°N 81.8368°E
- Country: India
- State: Andhra Pradesh
- District: Dr. B.R. Ambedkar Konaseema

Area
  - Total: 8 km^{2} (3.1 sq mi)

Population (2011)
  - Total: 5,236
  - Density: 619/km^{2} (1,600/sq mi)

Languages
  - Official: Telugu
- Time zone: UTC+5:30 (IST)
- Postal code: 533 446

Ithakota is a village in Ravulapalem Mandal, Dr. B.R. Ambedkar Konaseema district in the state of Andhra Pradesh in India.

== Geography ==
Ithakota is located at 16.7192°N 81.8368°E.

== Demographics ==
As of 2011 India census, Ithakota had a population of 5,236, out of which 2,642 were male and 2,594 were female. The population of children below 6 years of age was 10%. The literacy rate of the village was 72%.
