= Peddapuram =

- Town
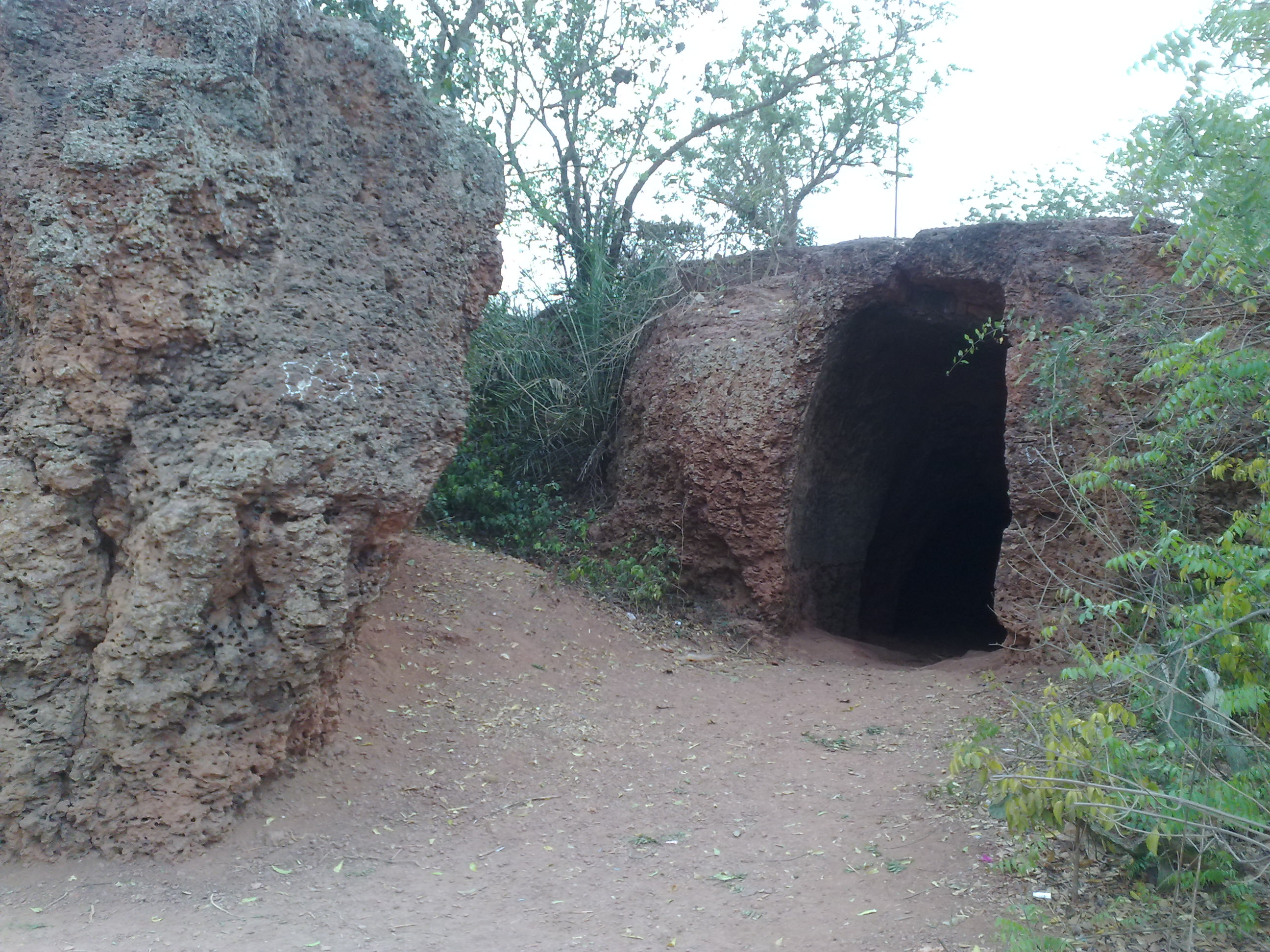
- Caves on Pandavula metta

- Location in Andhra Pradesh, India
- Coordinates: 17.08°N 82.13°E
- Country: India
- State: Andhra Pradesh
- District: Kakinada

Government
  - MLA: Nimmakayala Chinarajappa

Area
  - Total: 41.13 km^{2} (15.88 sq mi)

Population (2011)
  - Total: 49,477
  - Density: 1,203/km^{2} (3,116/sq mi)

Languages
  - Official: Telugu
- Time zone: UTC+5:30 (IST)
- Postal code: 533437
- Vehicle Registration: AP05 (Former); AP39 (from 30 January 2019)

Peddapuram is a town in the Kakinada district of Andhra Pradesh in South India. The town also forms a part of Godavari Urban Development Authority.

Peddapuram is known for its milk based sweet called PalaKova. The town is also popular in manufacturing the Silk Sarees and other Handloom varieties.

== Geography ==
Peddapuram is located at 17.08°N 82.13°E. It has an average elevation of 35 metres (114 feet). It's located next to Kakinada.

== Demographics ==
As of 2011 Census of India, the town had a population of 49,477. The total population constitute, 24,334 males, 25,143 females and 4,912 children, in the age group of 0–6 years. The average literacy rate stands at 76.14% with 33,930 literates, higher than the national average of 73.00%.

== History ==
In olden days it was referred as Kimmuru by natives and a Paragana within the Rajamundry Sarkar of Mughal empire's Deccan subah. By the time of 1785 the Peddapuram Estate extended from Totapalli to Nagaram encompassing villages and towns. During the British rule, Sri Raya Jagapati was chosen to take over the estate in 1802. After Sri Raya Jagapati's death, the three wives, Lakshmi Narasayyamma, Bucchi Seetayyamma and Bucchi Bangaramma, ruled the estate in succession. Raya Jagapati's widow Bucchi Seetayyamma, ruled from 1828-1835. She founded two trusts for the poor, one in Peddapuram and another in Kattipudi in East Godavari. Peddapuram was ruled by Sri Raja Vatsavayi Jagapati Raja Bahadur Dynasty. Vatsavai Dynasty Kings ruled Peddapuram, Tuni, Kottam Estate.

There are some ancient caves with the supposed footprints of Bhima (Pandavas).

== Civic administration ==
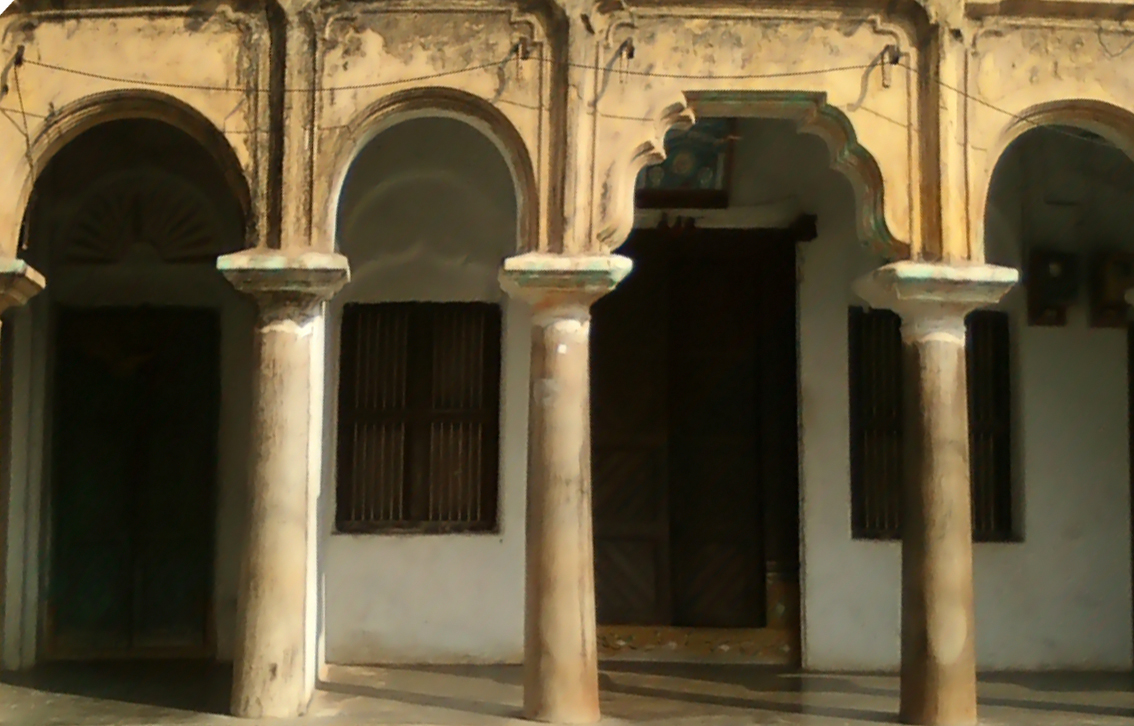
Portico of an old house in Peddapuram town

Peddapuram municipality was established in 1915 and became the second oldest municipality after Bheemunipatnam in Andhra Pradesh. Initially the British appointed Sri V. K. Anantakrishna Ayyar followed by Sri Abhinava Patnayak and Sri Pingali Krishnarao. Sri Goli Pedda Kondayya was the first one direct elected as Chairman of the municipality.

Peddapuram revenue division (or Peddapuram division) is an administrative division in the Kakinada district of the Indian State of Andhra Pradesh. It is one of the 2 revenue divisions in the district which consists of 11 mandals under its administration. Peddapuram Town is the Divisional Headquarters.

== Transportation ==
Peddapuram town is located on Rajahmundry-Kakinada ADB road. APSRTC Bus Services are available to Vijayawada and Hyderabad Cities. The nearest railway station to Peddapuram is Samalkot railway station which is 5km away. The nearest airport to the town is Rajahmundry Airport which is 35km away.

== Education ==
The first school was established here in Peddapuram in 1891 by the Andhra Evangelical Lutheran Church Society which also had boarding facilities. Among the eminent personalities who studied in this school include Archbishop Marampudi Joji and M. Victor Paul.

The primary and secondary school education is imparted by government, aided and private schools, under the School Education Department of the state. The medium of instruction followed by different schools are English, Telugu.

There is an Agricultural Research Station which does research on ragi and tapioca and is affiliated to Acharya N. G. Ranga Agricultural University. Sri Muppana Veerraju High School is one of the oldest school which is imparting elementary and high school education to many students without any profit motive. S.R.V.B.S.J.B. M.R. College has completed 50 years; it celebrated its Golden Jubilee on 4 February 2018 by its old students association.

In order to provide good quality modern education to the talented children predominantly from the rural areas, without regard to their family socio-economic conditions, the Government of India established Navodaya Vidyalayas, on an average, one in each district of the country during the seventh Five Year Plan period and Peddapuram was selected to establish Navodaya Vidyalaya. Jawahar Navodaya Vidyalaya.

Colleges located in Peddapuram Rural :

Name	Year Founded	Course
Aditya Engineering College	2004	Engineering
Pragati Engineering College	2001	Engineering
St. Mary's College of Pharmacy	2007	Pharmacy

== IDA Peddapuram ==
Peddapuram is one of the Industrial Development Area (IDA) in Kakinada District of AP and has lot of popular industries established in the town and its rural surroundings. Both Peddapuram and Samalkot (Samarlakota) municipalities and the corresponding rural areas comes under IDA PEDDAPURAM.

Some Popular Industries located in IDA Peddapuram :

- Sri Lalitha Enterprises Industries Private Limited (Lalitha Brand Rice)
- Pattabhi Agro Foods Private Limited (Lohitha Rice)
- Sri Venkateswara Rice Industry (Lepakshi Rice)
- NSR Industries (Bio Diesel Manufacturer)
- Reliance Bio Diesel Pilot Plant (Bio Diesel Manufacturer)
- Aparna Enterprises Limited (Ceramic Tile Plant)
- R A K Ceramics India Private Limited (Ceramics Plant)
- Shri Girija Alloy & Power (I) Pvt. Ltd. (Power Plant)
- GVT Gauthami Power Limited (Power Plant)

== Notable people ==
- Anjali Devi, (Telugu Actress)
- Easwari Rao, (Telugu Actress)
- Dubbing Janaki, (Telugu Actress)
- Marampudi Joji, Archbishop of Hyderabad
