= Bodasakurru =

- village
- Interactive map of Bodasakurru
- Location in Andhra Pradesh, India Bodasakurru (India)
- Coordinates: 16.5312°N 81.9750°E
- Country: India
- State: Andhra Pradesh
- District: Dr. B.R. Ambedkar Konaseema

Area
  - Total: 6 km^{2} (2.3 sq mi)

Population (2011)
  - Total: 6,036
  - Density: 1,014/km^{2} (2,630/sq mi)

Languages
  - Official: Telugu
- Time zone: UTC+5:30 (IST)
- Postal code: 533 446

Bodasakurru is a village in Allavaram Mandal, Konaseema district in the state of Andhra Pradesh in India.

== Demographics ==
As of 2011 India census, Bodasakurru had a population of 6036, out of which 2993 were male and 3043 were female. The population of children below 6 years of age was 10%. The literacy rate of the village was 76%.
