= Lawspet =

Coordinates: 11.955853315°N 79.81712365°E

Lawspet is a locality in the union territory of Puducherry in India. It was named after Jean Law de Lauriston, a French governor military commander and nephew of John Law who was known to Mughal historians as Musa Lass. There is an Assembly Constituency in its name.

== Demographics ==
Lawspet is one of the most densely populated areas of Puducherry and is popular for the educational institutions. Previously, it was sparingly populated until 1990, when further many government residences and privately owned buildings started coming up.

== Educational institutions ==
=== Colleges ===
- Community College
- Kanchimamunivar Centre for Post Graduate Studies
- Tagore Arts College

=== Schools ===
- SABARIVIDHYASHRAM HIGHER SECONDARY SCHOOL
- Fatima Higher Secondary School
- Sri Sithanandha Higher Secondary School
- Motilal Nehru Government Polytechnic
- Women's Polytechnic
- Teacher Training Institute
- Government Technical Higher Secondary School
- Saint Joseph of Cluny Higher Secondary School
- Sri Sankara Vidyalaya Higher Secondary School
- Don Bosco Mat. Hr.sec. school
- Maruti school
- Vivekanandha Higher Secondary School
- Navalar Nedunchezian Government Higher Secondary School
- Vallalar Government Higher Secondary School.

== Hospitals ==
- Primary Health Centre, Lawspet
- L.K. Nursing Home, Mahaveer Nagar
- MVR Medical Centre, ECR, Lawspet
- Be-well Hospital, ECR, Puducherry

== Main areas ==
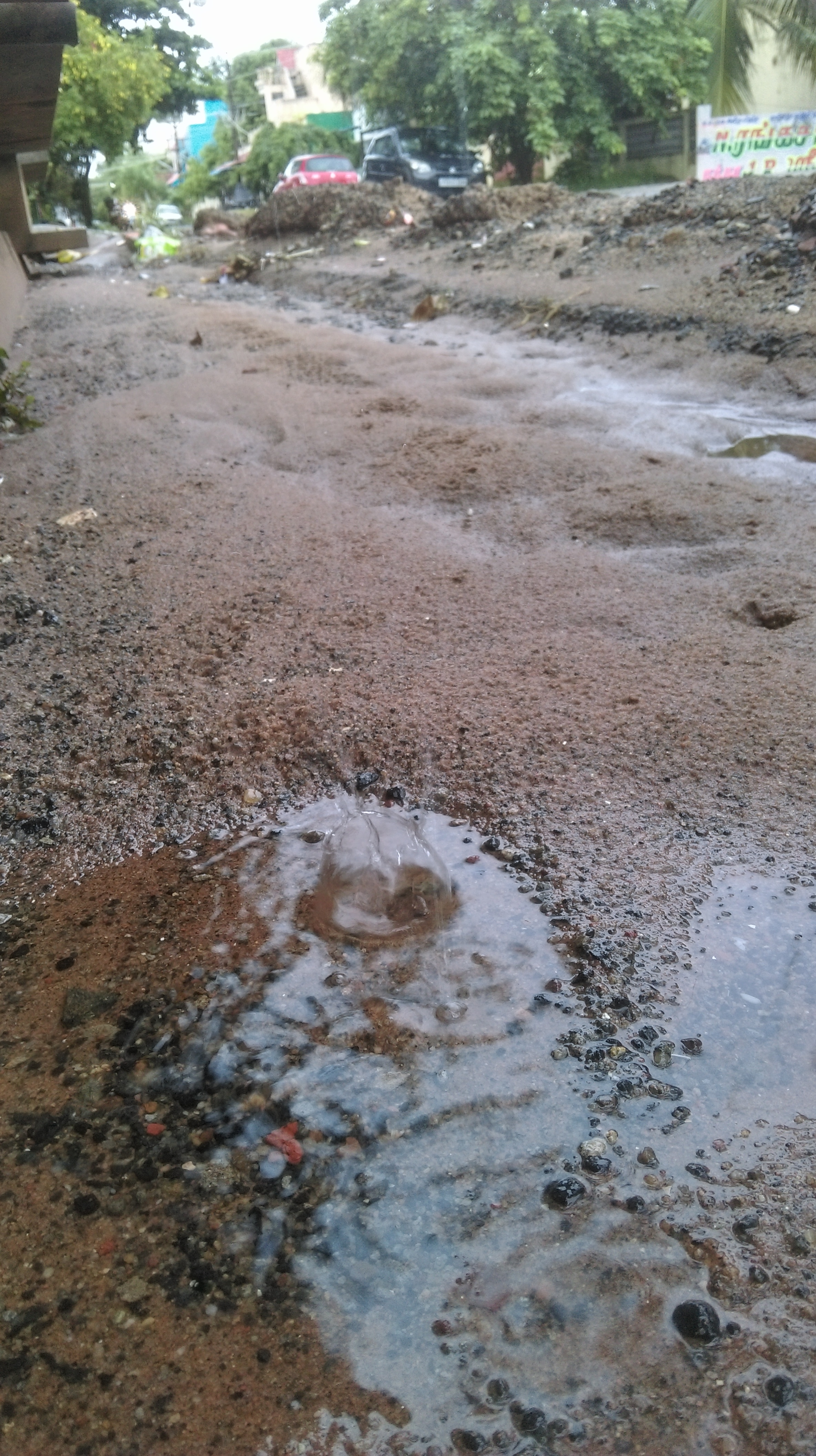
Drainage on a muddy road during the rainy season

- Lawspet
- Karuvadikuppam
- Pethuchettypet
- Sellaperumalpet
- Vallalar Nagar
- Shanthi Nagar
- Mahaveer Nagar
- Nehru Ville Nagar
- College Road
- Airport Road
- Ashok Nagar
- Kumaran Nagar
- Kumaran Nagar Extension
- Beasant Nagar
- Kurinji Nagar
- Kurunji Nagar Extension
- Avvai Nagar
- Rajaji Nagar
- Pudupet
- Kottupalayam
- Nesavalar Nagar

== Religious buildings ==
- A mosque in Airport Road
- Karuvadikuppam (Sithananda Swamy Temple)
- Kurinji Nagar(Selva Vinayagar Temple, Ponniamman Temple, etc...)
- Murugan Temple, Mariamman Temple, Ponni Amman Temple at Pethuchettypet
- Perumal Temple at Mahaveer Nagar
- Moogambigai Temple at Santhi Nagar
- Saibaba Temple near Airport
- A big church in Don Bosco Campus.
- Subramaniar Swamy Temple
