= Chhachha =

Village in Uttar Pradesh, India

- Village
- Location in Uttar Pradesh, India
- Coordinates: 27.28421°N 79.14537°E
- Country: India
- State: Uttar Pradesh
- District: Mainpuri
- Tehsil: Bhongaon

Area
  - Total: 16.057 km^{2} (6.200 sq mi)

Population (2011)
  - Total: 11,223
  - Density: 698.95/km^{2} (1,810.3/sq mi)
- Time zone: UTC+5:30 (IST)

Chhachha (Chhāchhā) is a village in Sultanganj block of Mainpuri district, Uttar Pradesh. As of 2011, it had a population of 11,223, in 1,810 households.

== Geography ==
Chhachha is located about 5 km northwest of Bhongaon, the tehsil headquarters, and 13 km northeast of Mainpuri.

According to the 2011 census, Chhachha has a total area of 1,605.7 hectares, of which 623.2 were currently farmland, 766.9 were fallow lands, and 188.6 were under non-agricultural use. 3.6 hectares were occupied by orchards, 0 were occupied by permanent pastures, 23.3 were classified as cultivable but not currently under any agricultural use, and 0 were classified as non-cultivable. No forests existed on village lands.

== Demographics ==
As of 2011, Chhachha had a population of 11,223, in 1,810 households. This population was 53.2% male (5,973) and 46.8% female (5,250). The 0-6 age group numbered 1,822 (976 male and 846 female), or 16.2% of the total population. 1,695 residents were members of Scheduled Castes, or 15.1% of the total.

The 1981 census recorded Chhachha as having a population of 5,933 people, in 1,020 households.

The 1961 census recorded Chhachha as comprising 8 hamlets, with a total population of 4,012 people (2,186 male and 1,826 female), in 667 households and 560 physical houses. The area of the village was given as 4,019 acres and it had a post office at that point.

As of 1901, Chhachha was described as comprising 10 total sites, with a total population of 2,804. The village had a school at that point, and it was part of pargana Alipur Patti.

== Infrastructure ==
As of 2011, Chhachha had 6 primary schools; it did not have any government-affiliated healthcare facilities, but there was 1 charitable non-government hospital in the village. Drinking water was provided by tap, hand pump, and tube well; there were no public toilets. The village had a post office and public library, as well as at least some access to electricity for all purposes. Streets were made of both kachcha and pakka materials.
