= Sarkar (administrative division) =

Historical administrative division

Sarkar (Hindi: सरकार, Urdu: سركار, Punjabi: ਸਰਕਾਰ, Bengali: সরকার also spelt Circar) was a historical administrative division, used mostly in the Mughal Empire. It was a division of a Subah or province. A sarkar was further divided into Mahallas or Parganas.

The Sarkar system was replaced in the early 18th century by the Chakla system.

== Examples ==
- Northern Circars, the five individual districts making up a former division of British India's Madras Presidency
- Rajamundry Sarkar, one among the Northern Circars
- Pakhli, an ancient sarkar now part of Hazara, Pakistan
- Pakhal Sarkar, an area of Mansehra district in Khyber Pakhtunkhwa, Pakistan

== See also ==
- Administrative divisions of India
- Subah or Taraf, Pargana or Mahal, Mauza or Pir
