= Thallarevu =

Thallarevu తాళ్ళరేవు
- Village
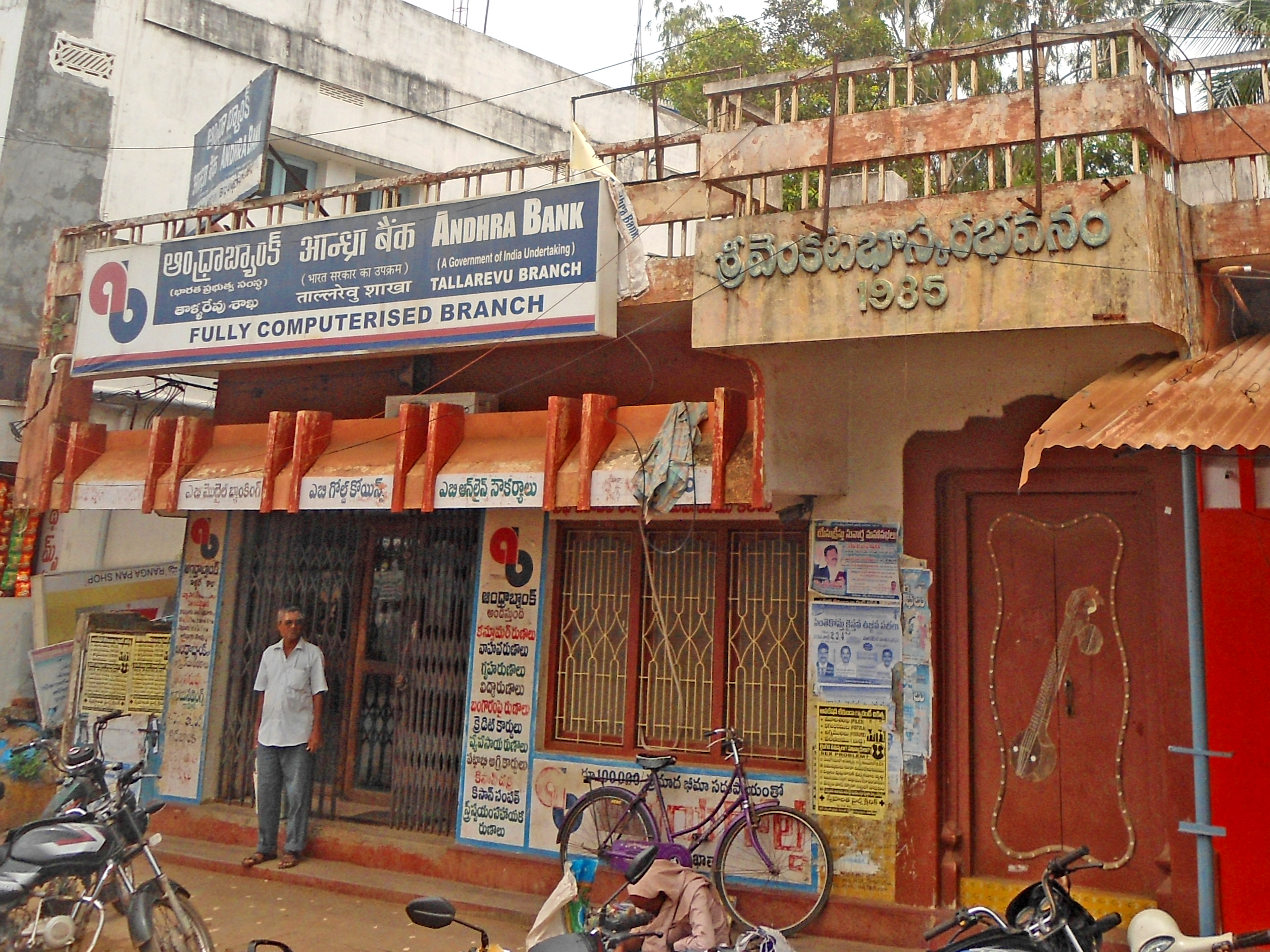
- Andhra Bank at Thallarevu in East Godavari district

- Location in Andhra Pradesh, India
- Coordinates: 16.8°N 82.23°E
- Country: India
- State: Andhra Pradesh
- District: Kakinada

Languages
  - Official: Telugu
- Time zone: UTC+5:30 (IST)
- PIN: 533463
- Vehicle Registration: AP05 (Former); AP39 (from 30 January 2019)

Thallarevu is a hamlet of Polekurru in Kakinada district of the Indian state of Andhra Pradesh. Its name literally mean ferry of toddy palm trees. It is located in Thallarevu mandal of Kakinada revenue division.
