= Nizam Ali Khan, Asaf Jah II =

Nizam of Hyderabad from 1762 to 1803

Mir Nizam Ali Khan Siddiqi Asaf Jah II
- Nizam-ul-Mulk
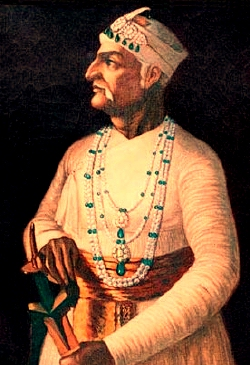

5th Nizam of Hyderabad
- Reign: 8 July 1762 – 6 August 1803
- Predecessor: Salabat Jung
- Successor: Sikander Jah, Asaf Jah III
- Born: 7 March 1734; Hyderabad, Hyderabad State, Maratha Empire (now in Telangana, India)
- Died: 6 August 1803 (aged 69); Chowmahalla Palace, Hyderabad, Hyderabad State, Maratha Empire (now in Telangana, India)
- Spouse: Bakhshi Begum; Tinat-un-Nisa Begum; Burhanpuri Begum; Dil Lagan Bai
- House: Asaf Jahi dynasty
- Father: Qamar-ud-din Khan Siddiqi, Asaf Jah I
- Mother: Umda Begum

Mir Nizam Ali Khan Siddiqi, Asaf Jah II (7 March 1734 – 6 August 1803) was the 5th Nizam of Hyderabad State between 1762 and 1803. He was born on 7 March 1734 as fourth son to Asaf Jah I and Umda Begum. His official name is Asaf Jah II, Nizam ul-Mulk, Nizam ud-Daula, Nawab Mir Nizam 'Ali Khan Siddiqi, Fateh Jang, Sipah Salar, Nawab Subedar of the Deccan. Sawānih-i-Deccan, a Persian work compiled by Munim Khan, a military commander during the era of Asaf Jah II gave more insight about administration of Asaf Jahis.

== Nizam of Hyderabad ==
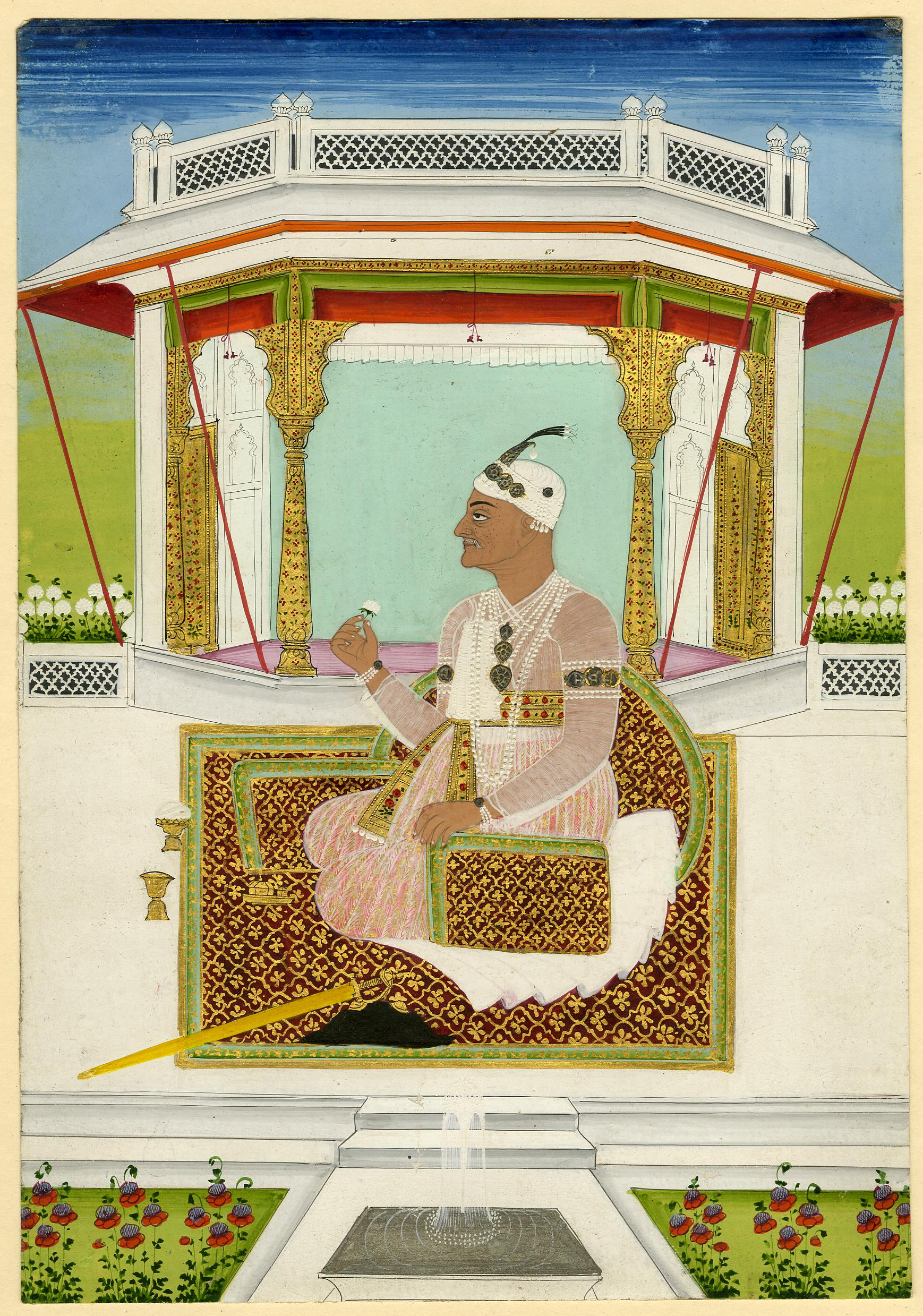
Portrait of Nizam ul-Mulk (Asaf Jah II, Nizam Ali Khan) sitting in an open pavilion on a carpet (British Library)

=== Faujdar of the Deccan ===
Nizam Ali was appointed as the leading commander and administrator of the Deccan in the year 1759, his successful methods of fighting against the Marathas had earned him much repute as a capable commander.

=== Shah Alam II' – Subedar of the Deccan ===
After the Marathas were routed during the Third Battle of Panipat in the year 1761, Nizam Ali and his army of 60,000 immediately advanced and repulsed them as far as Puna and forced them to sue for lasting peace. Nizam Ali then seized the Bidar Fort and later arrested Salabat Jung, this action of Nizam Ali Khan was ratified by the Mughal Emperor Shah Alam II, who issued a Firman terminating Salabat Jung (supported by the French East India Company), from his position as the Subedar of Deccan and appointing Nizam Ali Khan Asaf Jah II as his successor.

=== Supporting Shah Alam II ===
Immediately after recapturing the throne Shah Alam II in 1772, came under the influence of Nizam Ali Khan the Nizam of Hyderabad.

== Nizam's intervention against the Peshwa ==
In 1757, the Nizam (Salabat Jung) was defeated by Sadashivrao Bhau in the Battle of Sindhkhed and again at the Battle of Udgir in 1760. In 1762, Raghunathrao allied with the Nizam due to mutual distrust and differences with Madhavrao Peshwa. The Nizam marched towards Poona, unaware that Rughunathrao was going to betray him. In 1763, Madhavrao I along with Rughunathrao defeated the Nizam at the Battle of Rakshasbhuvan and signed a treaty with the Marathas.

In 1795, he was defeated by Madhavrao II's Marathas at the Battle of Kharda and was forced to cede Daulatabad, Aurangabad and Sholapur and pay an indemnity of Rs. 30 million.

A French general, Monsieur Raymond, served as his military leader, strategist and advisor.

== Fall of Mysore ==
The following year, he realized that the fall of Tipu Sultan was imminent and thus, he entered into a Subsidiary alliance with the British East India Company. Thus Hyderabad, which is in both area and population comparable to the United Kingdom, became a princely state within the British Raj.

== Death ==
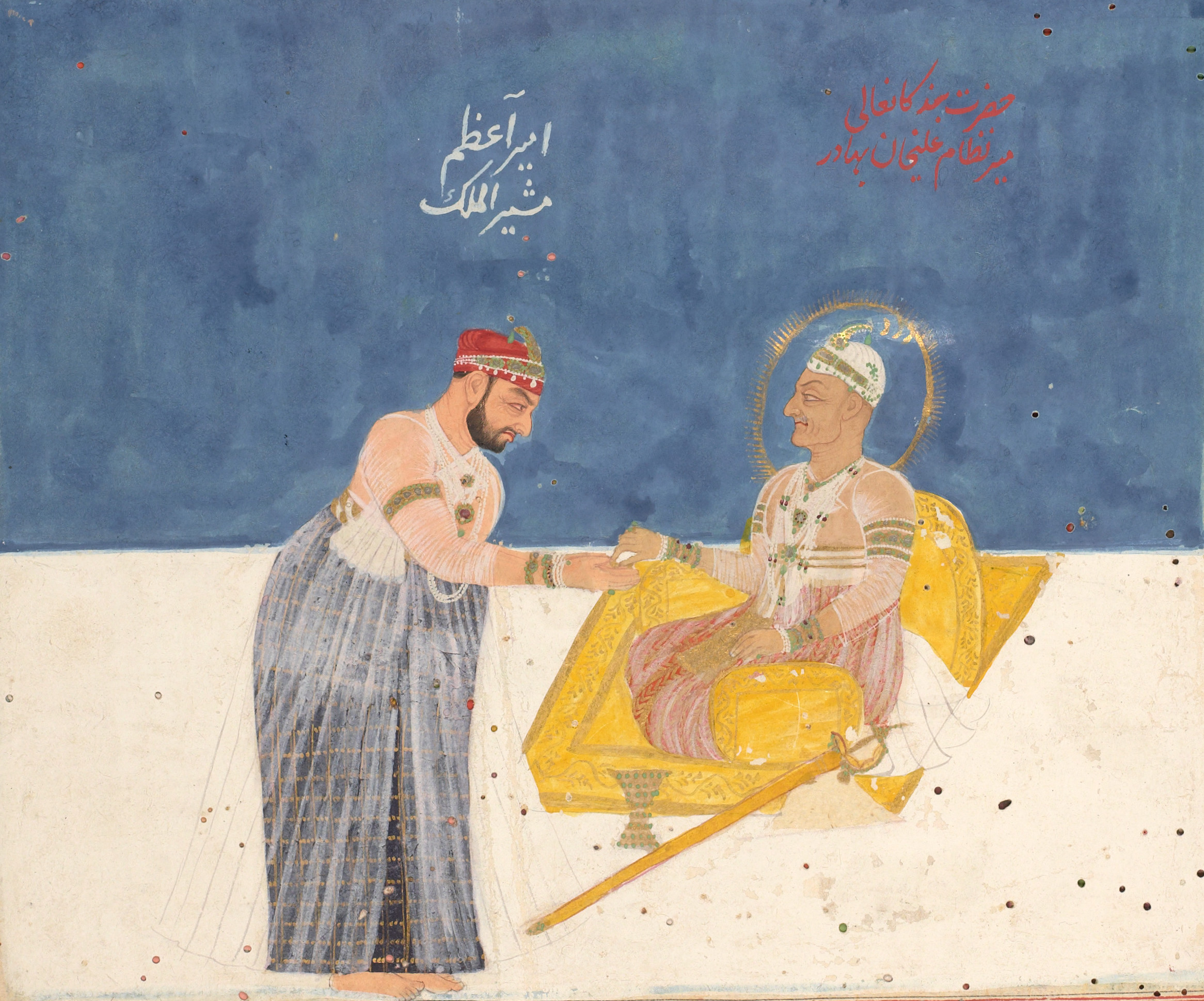
A portrait from the Ragadarshan (c. 1799-1804), completed near the end of the Nizam's life. It depicts Asaf Jah II (right) receiving his Prime Minister, Arastu Jah.

Asaf Jah II died at Chowmahalla Palace, Hyderabad, at the age of 69 on 6 August 1803.

== Family ==
Consorts

- Bakhshi Begum (died on 21 December 1813, buried in Makkah Masjid, Hyderabad), Nizam's favourite wife;
- Tinat-un-Nisa Begum (buried in Makkah Masjid, Hyderabad), a servant in service of Bakhshi Begum, and mother of Sikander Jah, Asaf Jah III and Akbar Jah;
- Burhanpuri Begum (buried in Makkah Masjid, Hyderabad), mother of Jahandar Jah;
- Dil Lagan Bai (died 3 June 1809), mother of a son born on 25 November 1777;

Daughters

- Fakhr-un-Nisa Begum also known as Manjli Begum, married to Fathyab-ud-Daulah, the grandson of Khaja Hamid Khan, the uncle of Asaf Jah I;
- Sajida Begum, married to Mir Qudrut Ullah Khan, Ibrat Jung, son of Shuja-ul-Mulk;
- Naqsh Bandi Begum (died 18 November 1808, buried in Hazrat Barhana Sahib Dargah), married to Mahabat Jung;
- Basheer-un-Nisa Begum, married in 1800 to Amir-i-Kabir I, the first princess to be married in Paigah;
- Imami Begum (buried in Makkah Masjid, Hyderabad);
- A daughter married to the son of Shuja-ul-Mulk (died 23 December 1788);
- A daughter married on 5 September 1776 to Zulfiqar-ud-Daulah Bahadur, son of Basalat Jung;
- Riyaz-un-nisa Begum (died 3 June 1809), married to Khan-i-Shiraz;
- A daughter married to Dara Jah;

== See also ==
- Hyderabad State
- Nizam of Hyderabad
- Asaf Jahi dynasty
- Sawānih-i-Deccan

== Bibliography ==
- Rao, Ekbote Gopal (1954). The Chronology of Modern Hyderabad, 1720-1890. Central Records Office Hyderabad Government.

Nizam Ali Khan, Asaf Jah II Asaf Jahi dynasty
Preceded by Asaf ad-Dawlah Mir Ali Salabat Jang	Nizam of Hyderabad; 8 July 1762 – 6 August 1803	Succeeded by Mir Akbar Ali Khan Siddiqi Asaf Jah III
