= Petit pâté de Pézenas =

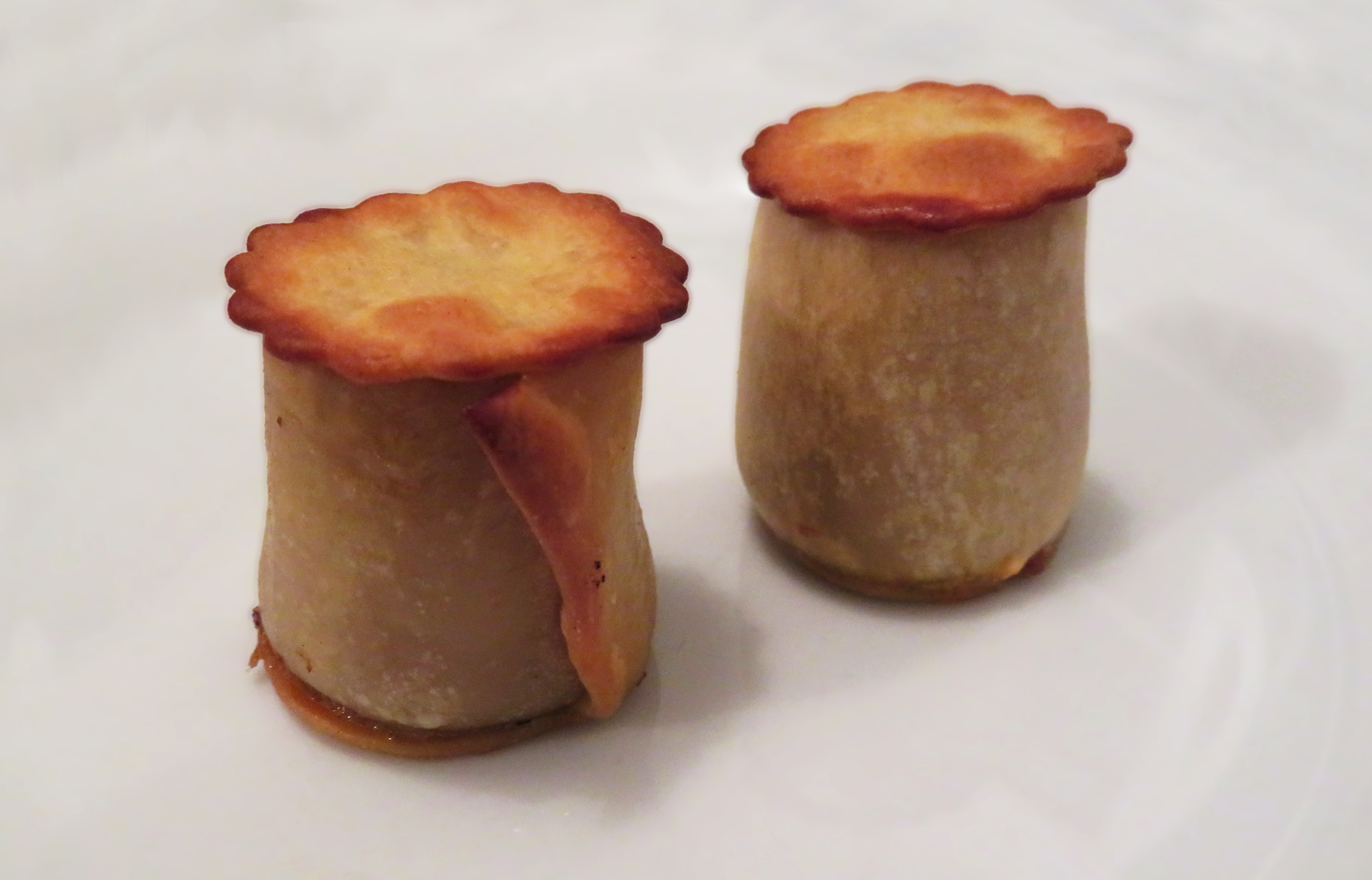
Two petits pâtés de Pézenas

Petit pâté de Pézenas is a specialty of the town of Pézenas in the Hérault département of France.

The size and shape of a spool of sewing thread, these little meat pies are a golden brown, crispy pastry with a moist, sweet inside, composed of lean roast mutton, sheep suet, brown and white sugar, lemon peel, salt, and pepper. They can be eaten as an hors d'oeuvre, with a salad or as a dessert. They are cooked in patisseries all over the town. According to legend, Lord Clive or his cook invented the recipe using spices from India and taught it to the pastry makers of Pézenas when they were staying at the Château de Larzac in 1768. The same filling is also used in Tourte de Pézenas, made with flaky pastry.

== Legal protection ==
The Confrérie du petit pâté de Pézenas was created in 1991 to "promote and defend the Petit pâté de Pézenas". To prevent the recipe going abroad or being stolen, the fraternity has filed it with the Institut national de la propriété industrielle (National Institute of Industrial Property, INPI), giving legal protection.

== In culture ==
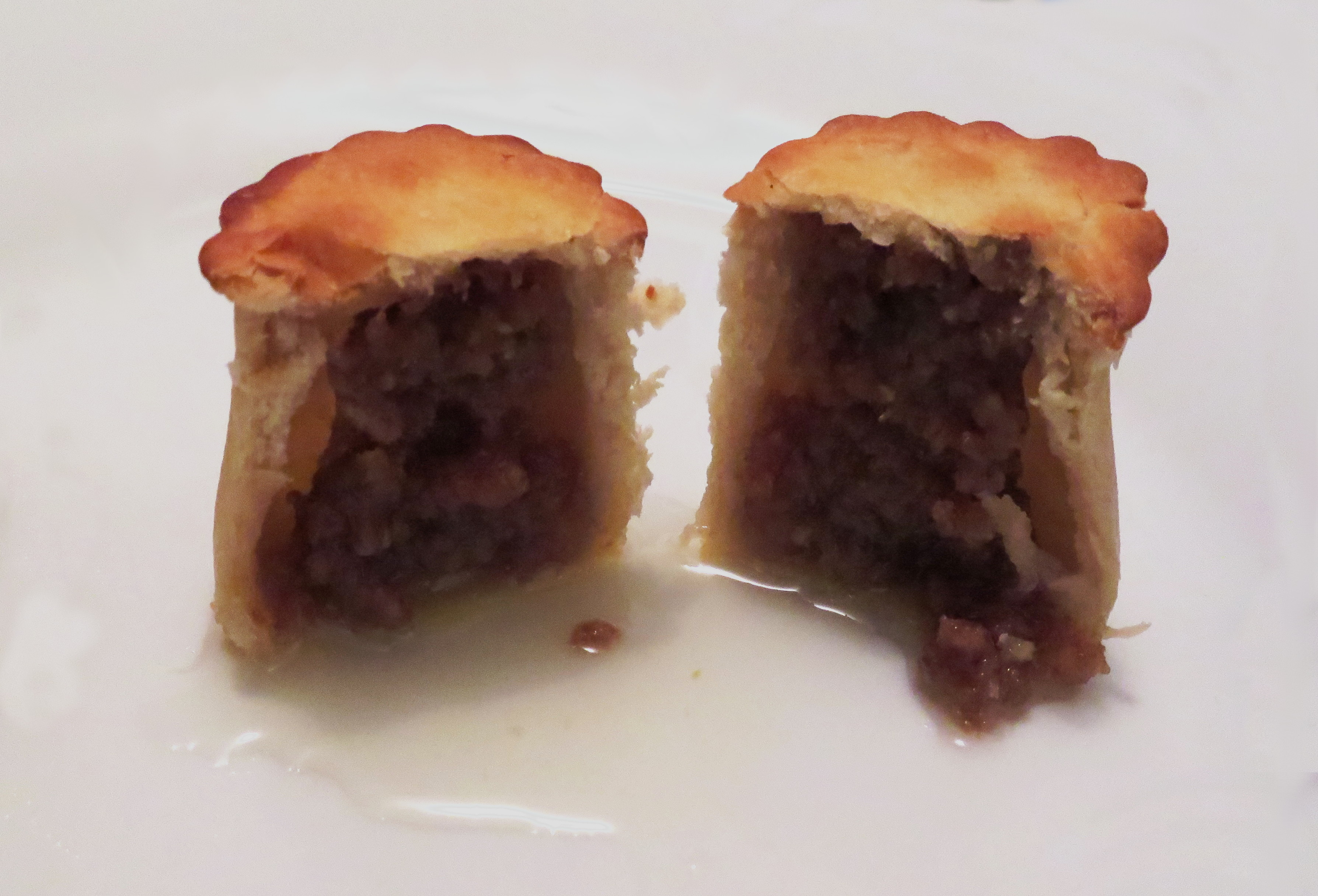
Petit pâté de Pézenas, cut in half to show the filling

In the BBC TV programme MasterChef: The Professionals, broadcast on 27 November 2012, Michel Roux, Jr. demonstrated how to cook the dish and set it as the "classic recipe" for contestants to make.
