= John Caillaud =

Commander-in-Chief, India

- Born: 5 February 1726; Dublin, Ireland
- Died: December 1812 (aged 86); Aston Rowant, Oxfordshire
- Military career
- Allegiance: Kingdom of Great Britain
- Branch: British Army
- Rank: Brigadier General
- Commands: Indian Army
- Conflicts: Jacobite rising Seven Years' War

Brigadier-General John Caillaud (5 February 1726 – December 1812) was Commander-in-Chief, India.

== Military career ==
Caillaud was commissioned into Onslow's Regiment in 1743. In 1746, during the Jacobite rising, he took part in the Battle of Falkirk and the Battle of Culloden. In 1752 he was made a captain in the Madras Army. During the Seven Years' War he was involved with skirmishes with the French.

In 1759 he was made Commander of the Bengal Army. Edmund Burke later claimed that, during the course of the Bengal War, Caillaud had set three official seals to a document expressing an intent to kill Ali Gauhar, the Mughal Crown Prince, allegations that Caillaud strongly denied.

He subsequently became Commander of the Madras Army in which capacity he negotiated a treaty with Nazim Ali which guaranteed Nazim Ali military support in return for occupation of the Northern Circars by the East India Company. He is "reputed to have made 60,000 pagodas as negotiator of a 1767 treaty with the Nizam of Hyderabad".

In 1775 he retired to Aston Rowant in Oxfordshire and died in December 1812.

== Family ==
In 1763 he married Mary Pechell: they had no children.

Military offices
Preceded by Robert Clive	Commander-in-Chief, India; 1760	Succeeded by John Carnac
