= Robert Clive =

British military officer (1725–1774)

The Right Honourable The Lord Clive KB FRS
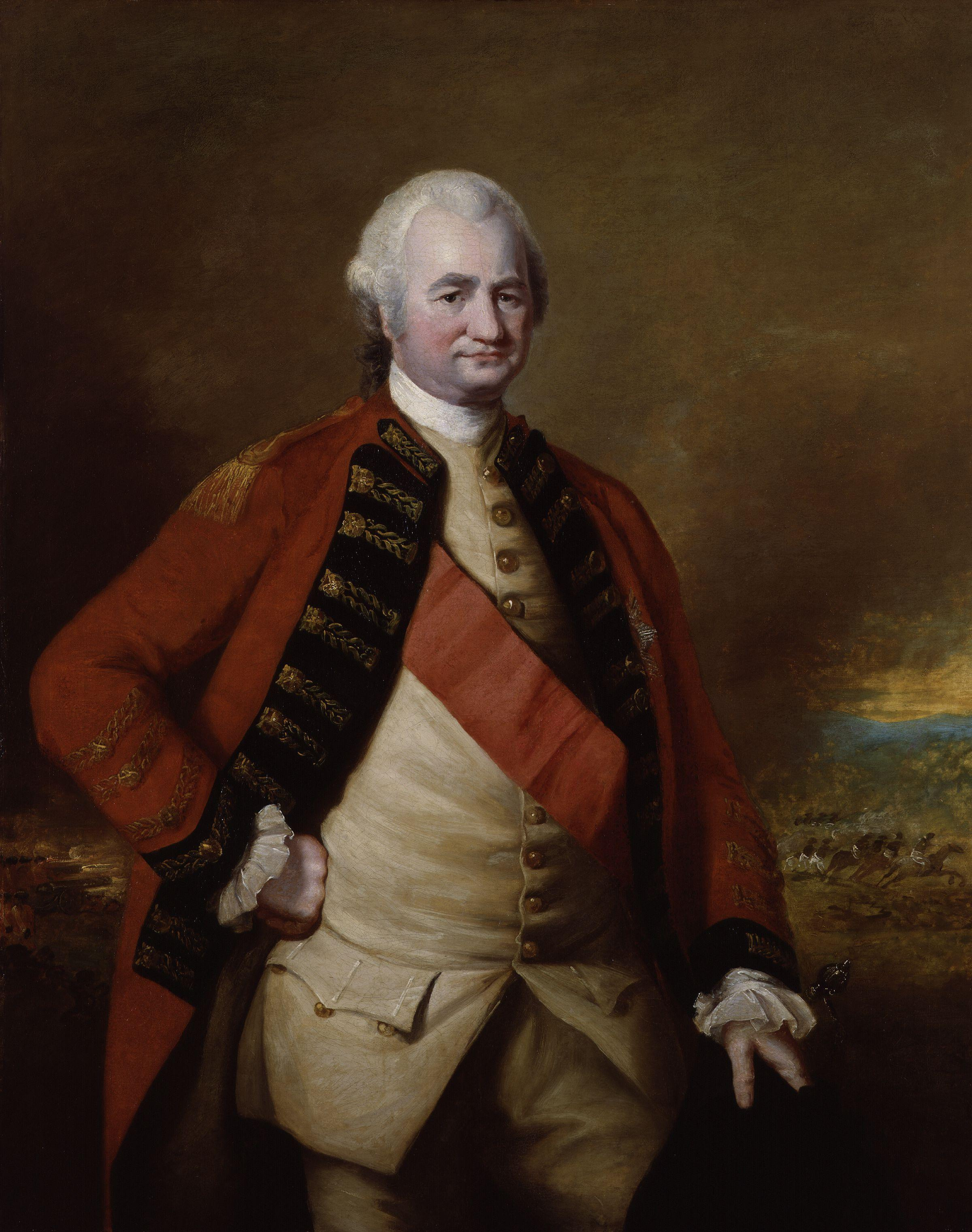
- Robert Clive in the dress uniform of a British officer (c. 1770s) (Note: Although Clive never held a commission in the British Army, officers of the Bengal Army, which was part of the East India Company Armies, wore similar uniforms.)

Governor of the Presidency of Fort William
- In office 1757–1760
- Preceded by: Roger Drake as President
- Succeeded by: Henry Vansittart
- In office 1764–1767
- Preceded by: Henry Vansittart
- Succeeded by: Harry Verelst

Personal details
- Born: 29 September 1725 Styche, Shropshire, England
- Died: 22 November 1774 (aged 49) London, England
- Spouse: Margaret Maskelyne (m. 1753)
- Children: 9, including Edward
- Nickname: Clive of India

Military service
- Branch/service: Bengal Army
- Years of service: 1746–1774
- Rank: Lieutenant-Colonel
- Unit: British East India Company
- Commands: Commander-in-Chief, Bengal
- Battles/wars: Major engagements: War of the Austrian Succession; Battle of Madras; Siege of Cuddalore; Siege of Pondicherry; Tanjore Expedition; Second Carnatic War; Siege of Trichinopoly; Siege of Arcot Battle of Arnee; Battle of Chingleput; Battle of Seringham; Seven Years' War; Battle of Chandannagar; Battle of Plassey; Battle of Vijaydurg

Robert Clive, 1st Baron Clive (29 September 1725 – 22 November 1774), also known as Clive of India, was the first British Governor of the Bengal Presidency. Clive has been widely credited for laying the foundation of the British East India Company (EIC) rule in Bengal.

He began as a "writer" (the term used then in India for an office clerk) for the EIC in 1744; however, after being caught up in military action during the fall of Madras, Clive joined the EIC's private army. Clive rapidly rose through the military ranks of the EIC and was eventually credited with establishing Company rule in Bengal by winning the Battle of Plassey in 1757. In return for supporting the Nawab Mir Jafar as ruler of Bengal, Clive was guaranteed a jagir of £90,000 (equivalent to £9,300,000 in 2025) per year, which was the rent the EIC would otherwise pay to the Nawab for their tax-farming concession. When Clive left India in January 1767 he had a fortune of £401,102 (equivalent to £62,200,000 in 2025) which he remitted through the Dutch East India Company.

Blocking impending French mastery of India, Clive improvised a 1751 military expedition that ultimately enabled the EIC to adopt the French strategy of indirect rule via puppet government. In 1755 he was hired by the EIC to return to India, where he secured the company's trade interests by overthrowing the ruler of Bengal, the richest state in India. Back in England from 1760 to 1765, he used the wealth accumulated from India to obtain an Irish barony from the Prime Minister, Thomas Pelham-Holles, and a seat in Parliament via Henry Herbert, 1st Earl of Powis, representing the Whig party in Shrewsbury, Shropshire (1761–1774), as he had previously done in Mitchell, Cornwall (1754–1755).

Clive's actions on behalf of the EIC have made him one of Britain's most controversial colonial figures. His achievements included checking French imperialist ambitions on the Coromandel Coast and establishing EIC control over Bengal, thereby furthering the establishment of the British Raj, though he worked only as an agent of the East India Company, not of the British government.

== Early life ==
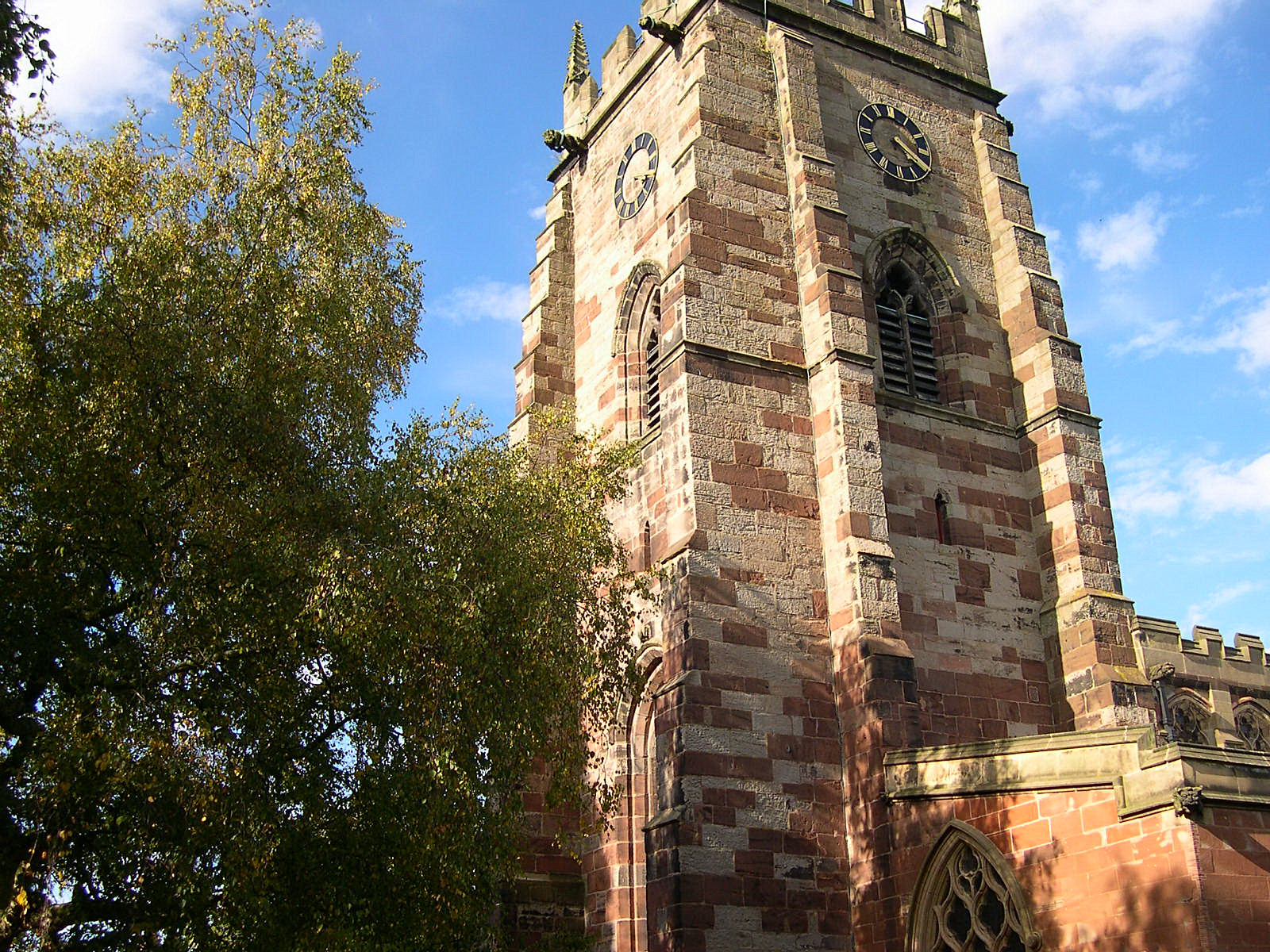
St Mary's Church, Market Drayton, whose tower Clive is reputed to have climbed

Robert Clive was born at Styche, the Clive family estate, near Market Drayton in Shropshire, on 29 September 1725 to Richard Clive and Rebecca (née Gaskell) Clive. The family had held the small estate since the time of Henry VII and had a lengthy history of public service: members of the family included a Chancellor of the Exchequer of Ireland under Henry VIII, and a member of the Long Parliament. Robert's father, who supplemented the estate's modest income by practising as a lawyer, also served in Parliament for many years, representing Montgomeryshire. Robert was their eldest son of thirteen children; he had seven sisters and five brothers, six of whom died in infancy.

Clive's father was known to have a temper, which the boy apparently inherited. For reasons that are unknown, Clive was sent to live with his mother's sister in Manchester while still a toddler. The site is now Hope Hospital. Biographer Robert Harvey suggests that this move was made because Clive's father was busy in London trying to provide for the family. Daniel Bayley, the sister's husband, reported that the boy was "out of measure addicted to fighting". He was a regular troublemaker in the schools to which he was sent. One (possibly apocryphal) story recounts that he and a gang of teenagers established a protection racket that vandalised the shops of uncooperative merchants in Market Drayton. There Clive also exhibited fearlessness at an early age. He is reputed to have climbed the tower of St Mary's Parish Church in Market Drayton and perched on a gargoyle, frightening those down below.

When Clive was nine his aunt died, and, after a brief stint in his father's cramped London quarters, he returned to Shropshire. There he attended the Market Drayton Grammar School, where his unruly behaviour (and an improvement in the family's fortunes) prompted his father to send him to Merchant Taylors' School in London. His bad behaviour continued, and he was then sent to a trade school in Hertfordshire to complete a basic education. Despite his early lack of scholarship, in his later years he devoted himself to improving his education. He eventually developed a distinctive writing style, and a speech in the House of Commons was described by William Pitt as the most eloquent he had ever heard.

== First journey to India (1744–1753) ==
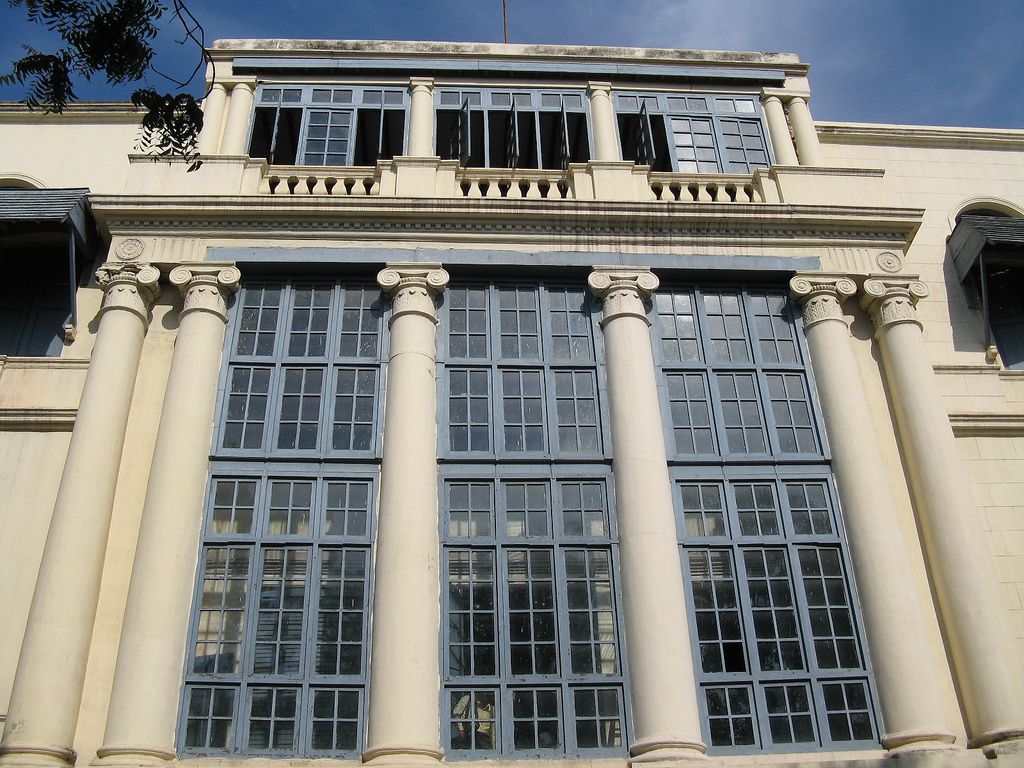
Clive House at Fort St. George, Chennai

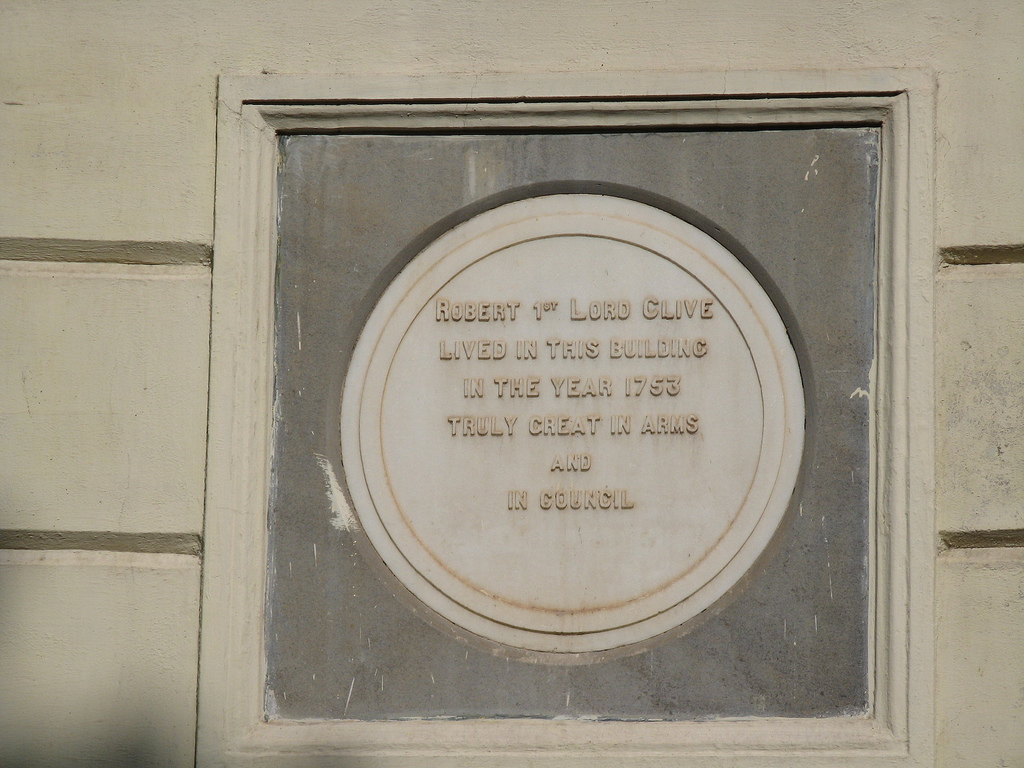
Plaque at Clive House

In December 1742, Clive's father acquired for him a position as a "writer" or clerk in the service of the East India Company, and in March 1743 Clive set sail for India. After running aground on the coast of Brazil, his ship was detained for nine months while repairs were completed. This enabled him to learn some Portuguese, one of the several languages then in use in south India because of the Portuguese centre at Goa.

At this time the East India Company had a small settlement at Fort St. George near the village of Madraspatnam, later Madras, now the major Indian metropolis of Chennai, in addition to others at Calcutta, Bombay, and Cuddalore. Clive arrived at Fort St. George in June 1744. His initial life there was difficult. He was burdened by debts he had incurred on his journey to India, and he had no acquaintances or connections in the British settlement. Around February 1745, he attempted suicide, failing because his pistol misfired twice. It seems that after this event Clive was convinced that fate had greater things in store for him. Many of his colleagues considered him "a difficult individual, prone to fits of black depression and melancholy."

Clive's work during his first two years in India was tedious, mainly consisting of tallying books and arguing with suppliers of the East India Company over the quality and quantity of their wares. In 1746 he moved to the accountant's office, where he gained a variety of technical skills associated with the company's mercantile dealings. He was given access to the governor's library, where he became a prolific reader.

=== Political situation in south India ===
The India Clive arrived in was divided into a number of successor states to the Mughal Empire. Over the forty years since the death of the Emperor Aurangzeb in 1707, the power of the emperor had gradually fallen into the hands of his provincial viceroys or Subahdars. The dominant rulers on the Coromandel Coast were the Nizam of Hyderabad, Asaf Jah I, and the Nawab of the Carnatic, Anwaruddin Muhammed Khan. The Nawab nominally owed fealty to the nizam, but in many respects acted independently. Fort St. George and the French trading post at Pondicherry were both located in the Nawab's territory.

The relationship between the Europeans in India was influenced by a series of wars and treaties in Europe, and by competing commercial rivalry for trade on the subcontinent. Through the 17th and early 18th centuries, the French, Dutch, Portuguese, and British had vied for control of various trading posts, and for trading rights and favour with local Indian rulers. The European merchant companies raised bodies of troops to protect their commercial interests and latterly to influence local politics to their advantage. Military power was rapidly becoming as important as commercial acumen in securing India's valuable trade, and increasingly it was used to appropriate territory and to collect land revenue.

=== First Carnatic War ===
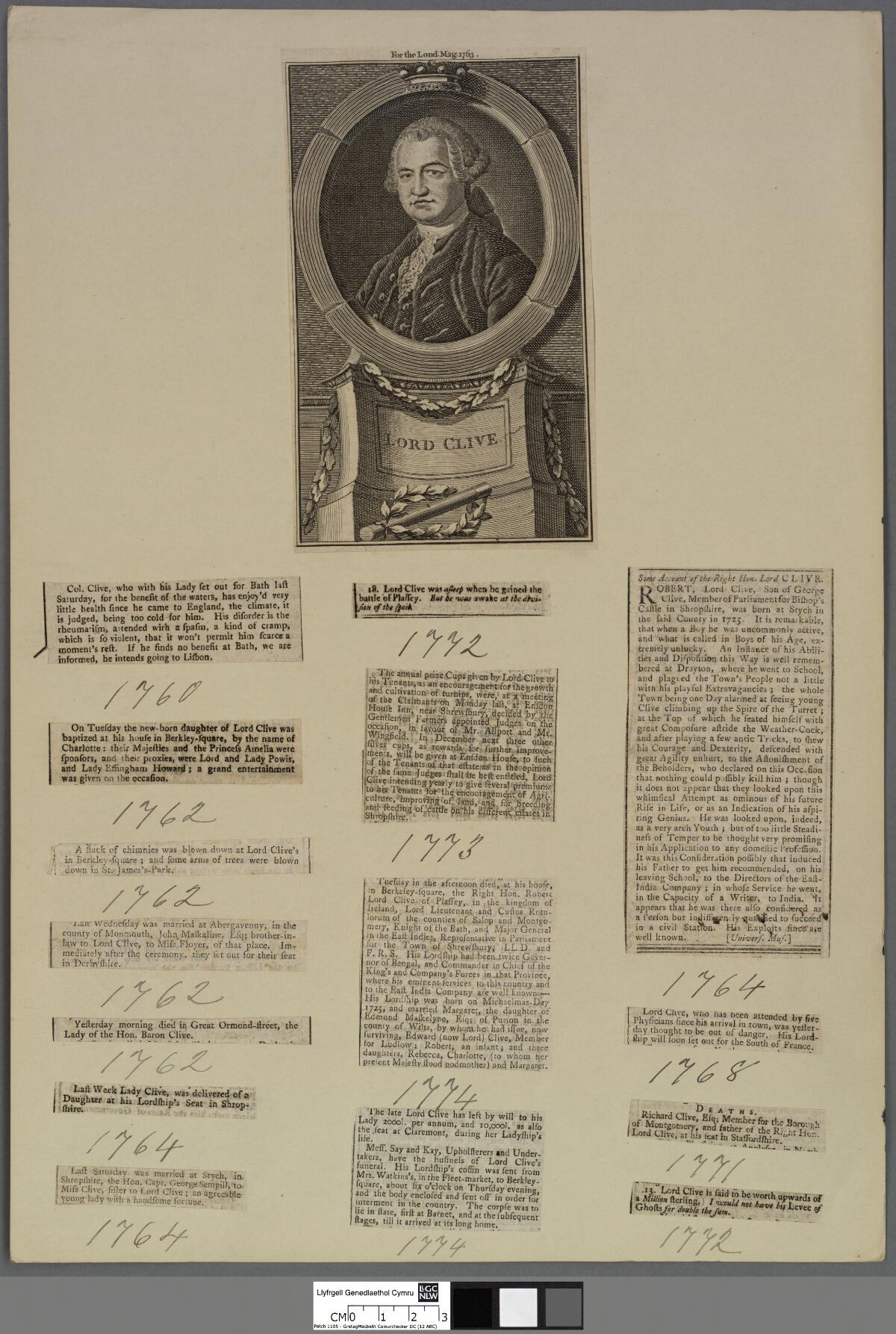
Portrait of Robert Clive (1725–1774), British military officer and East India Company official, from the Welsh Portrait Collection at the National Library of Wales

In 1720 France effectively nationalised the French East India Company, and began using it to expand its imperial interests. This became a source of conflict with the British in India with the entry of Britain into the War of the Austrian Succession in 1744. The Indian theatre of the conflict is also known as the First Carnatic War, referring to the Carnatic region on the southeast coast of India. Hostilities in India began with a British naval attack on a French fleet in 1745, which led the French Governor-General Dupleix to request additional forces. On 4 September 1746, Madras was attacked by French forces led by La Bourdonnais. After several days of bombardment the British surrendered and the French entered the city. The British leadership was taken prisoner and sent to Pondicherry. It was originally agreed that the town would be restored to the British after negotiation but this was opposed by Dupleix, who sought to annex Madras to French holdings.

The remaining British residents were asked to take an oath promising not to take up arms against the French; Clive and a handful of others refused, and were kept under weak guard as the French prepared to destroy the fort. Disguising themselves as natives, Clive and three others eluded their inattentive sentry, slipped out of the fort, and made their way to Fort St. David (the British post at Cuddalore), some 50 miles (80 km) to the south. Upon his arrival, Clive decided to enlist in the Company army rather than remain idle; in the hierarchy of the company, this was seen as a step down. Clive was, however, recognised for his contribution in the defence of Fort St. David, where the French assault on 11 March 1747 was repulsed with the assistance of the Nawab of the Carnatic, and was given a commission as ensign.

In the conflict, Clive's bravery came to the attention of Major Stringer Lawrence, who arrived in 1748 to take command of the British troops at Fort St. David. During the 1748 Siege of Pondicherry Clive distinguished himself in successfully defending a trench against a French sortie: one witness of the action wrote Clive's "platoon, animated by his exhortation, fired again with new courage and great vivacity upon the enemy." The siege was lifted in October 1748 with the arrival of the monsoons, but the war came to a conclusion with the arrival in December of news of the Peace of Aix-la-Chapelle. Madras was returned to the British as part of the peace agreement in early 1749.

=== Tanjore expedition ===
The end of the war between France and Britain did not, however, end hostilities in India. Even before news of the peace arrived in India, the British had sent an expedition to Tanjore on behalf of a claimant to its throne. This expedition, on which Clive, now promoted to lieutenant, served as a volunteer, was a disastrous failure. Monsoons ravaged the land forces, and the local support claimed by their client was not in evidence. The ignominious retreat of the British force (which lost its baggage train to the pursuing Tanjorean army while crossing a swollen river) was a blow to British reputation. Major Lawrence, seeking to recover British prestige, led the entire Madras garrison to Tanjore in response. At the fort of Devikottai on the Coleroon River the British force was confronted by the much larger Tanjorean army. Lawrence gave Clive command of 30 British soldiers and 700 sepoys, with orders to lead the assault on the fort. Clive led this force rapidly across the river and towards the fort, where the small British unit became separated from the sepoys and was enveloped by the Tanjorean cavalry. Clive was nearly cut down and the beachhead almost lost before reinforcements sent by Lawrence arrived to save the day.

The daring move by Clive had an important consequence: the Tanjoreans abandoned the fort, which the British triumphantly occupied. The success prompted the Tanjorean rajah to open peace talks, which resulted in the British being awarded Devikottai and the costs of their expedition, and the British client was awarded a pension in exchange for renouncing his claim. Lawrence wrote of Clive's action that "he behaved in courage and in judgment much beyond what could be expected from his years."

On the expedition's return the process of restoring Madras was completed. Company officials, concerned about the cost of the military, slashed its size, denying Clive a promotion to captain in the process. Lawrence procured for Clive a position as the commissary at Fort St. George, a potentially lucrative posting: its pay included commissions on all supply contracts.

== Second Carnatic War ==
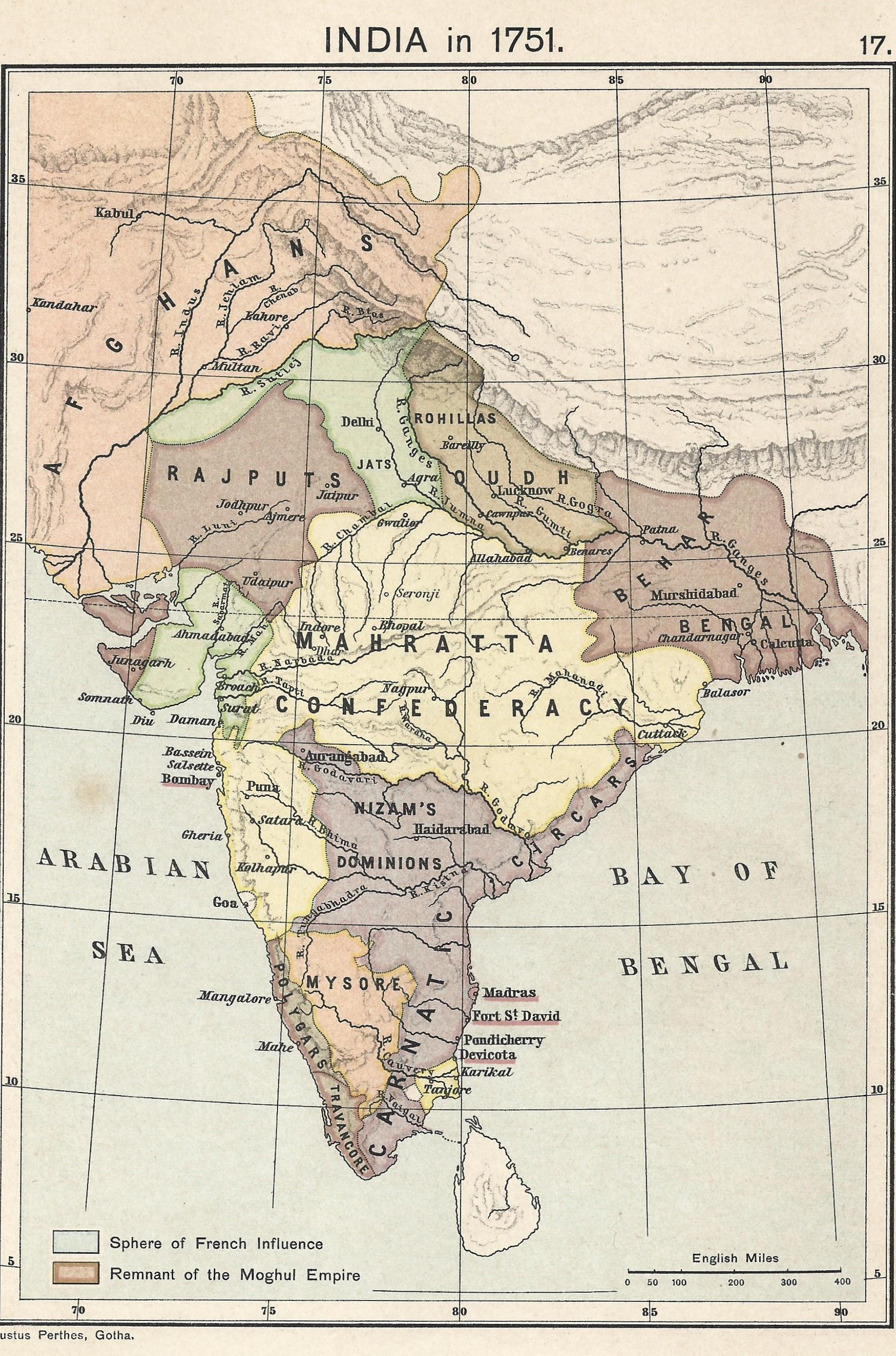
India in 1751

The death of Asaf Jah I, the Nizam of Hyderabad, in 1748 sparked a struggle to succeed him that is known as the Second Carnatic War, which was also furthered by the expansionist interests of French Governor-General Dupleix. Dupleix had grasped from the first war that small numbers of disciplined European forces (and well-trained sepoys) could be used to tip balances of power between competing interests, and used this idea to greatly expand French influence in southern India. For many years he had been working to negotiate the release of Chanda Sahib, a longtime French ally who had at one time occupied the throne of Tanjore, and sought for himself the throne of the Carnatic. Chanda Sahib had been imprisoned by the Marathas in 1740; by 1748 he had been released from custody and was building an army at Satara.

Upon the death of Asaf Jah I, his son, Nasir Jung, seized the throne of Hyderabad, although Asaf Jah had designated as his successor his grandson, Muzaffar Jung. The grandson, who was ruler of Bijapur, fled west to join Chanda Sahib, whose army was also reinforced by French troops sent by Dupleix. These forces met those of Anwaruddin Mohammed Khan in the Battle of Ambur in August 1749; Anwaruddin was slain, and Chanda Sahib victorious entered the Carnatic capital, Arcot. Anwaruddin's son, Muhammed Ali Khan Wallajah, fled to Trichinopoly where he sought the protection and assistance of the British. In thanks for French assistance, the victors awarded them a number of villages, including territory nominally under British sway near Cuddalore and Madras.

The British began sending additional arms to Muhammed Ali Khan Wallajah and sought to bring Nasir Jung into the fray to oppose Chanda Sahib. Nasir Jung came south to Gingee in 1750, where he requested and received a detachment of British troops. Chanda Sahib's forces advanced to meet them, but retreated after a brief long-range cannonade. Nasir Jung pursued, and was able to capture Arcot and his nephew, Muzaffar Jung. Following a series of fruitless negotiations and intrigues, Nasir Jung was assassinated by a rebellious soldier. This made Muzaffar Jung nizam and confirmed Chanda Sahib as Nawab of the Carnatic, both with French support. Dupleix was rewarded for French assistance with titled nobility and rule of the nizam's territories south of the Kistna River. His territories were "said to yield an annual revenue of over 350,000 rupees."

Robert Clive was not in southern India for many of these events. In 1750 Clive was afflicted with some sort of nervous disorder, and was sent north to Bengal to recuperate. It was there that he met and befriended Robert Orme, who became his principal chronicler and biographer. Clive returned to Madras in 1751.

=== Siege of Arcot ===
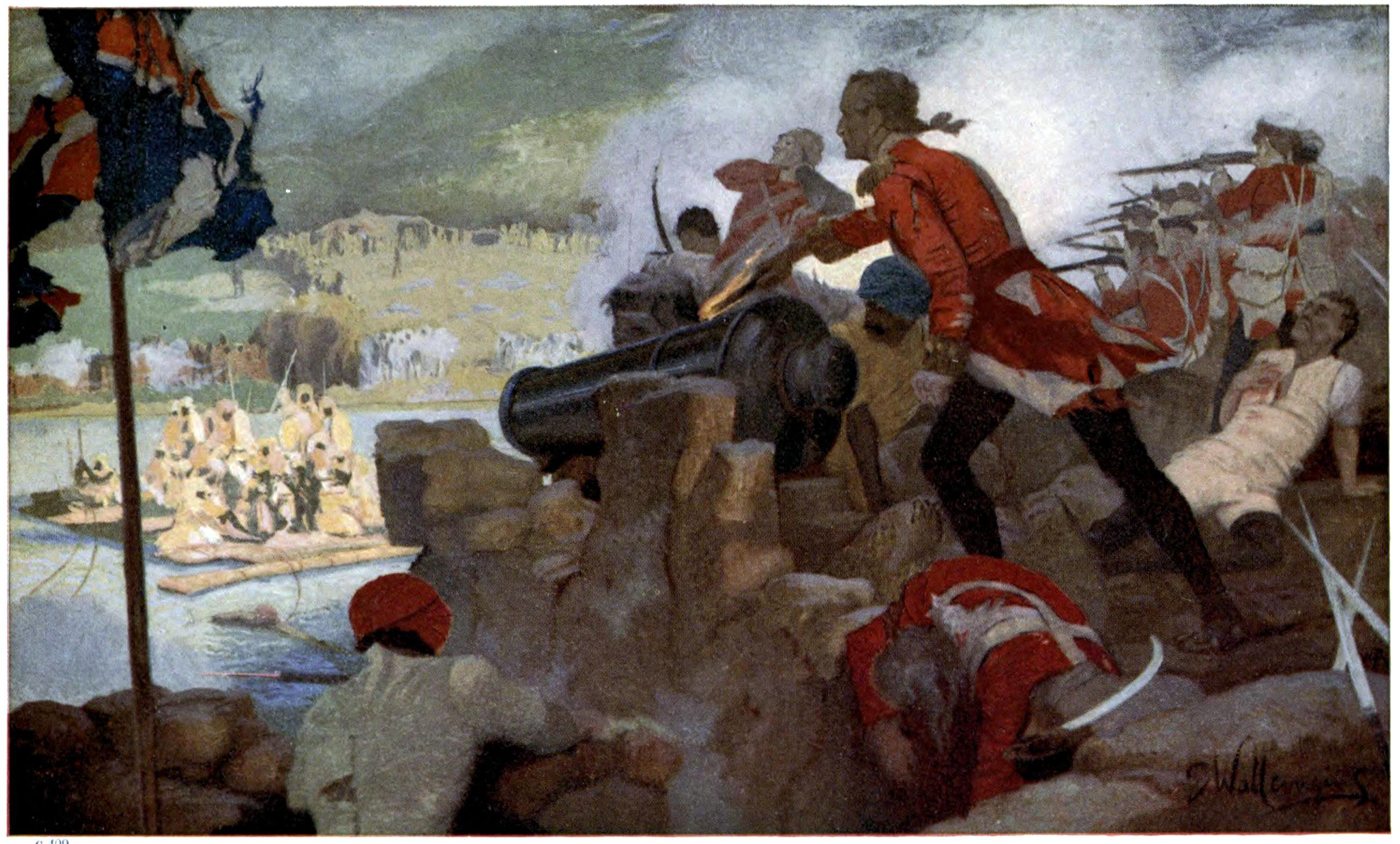
Clive at the Siege of Arcot in 1751

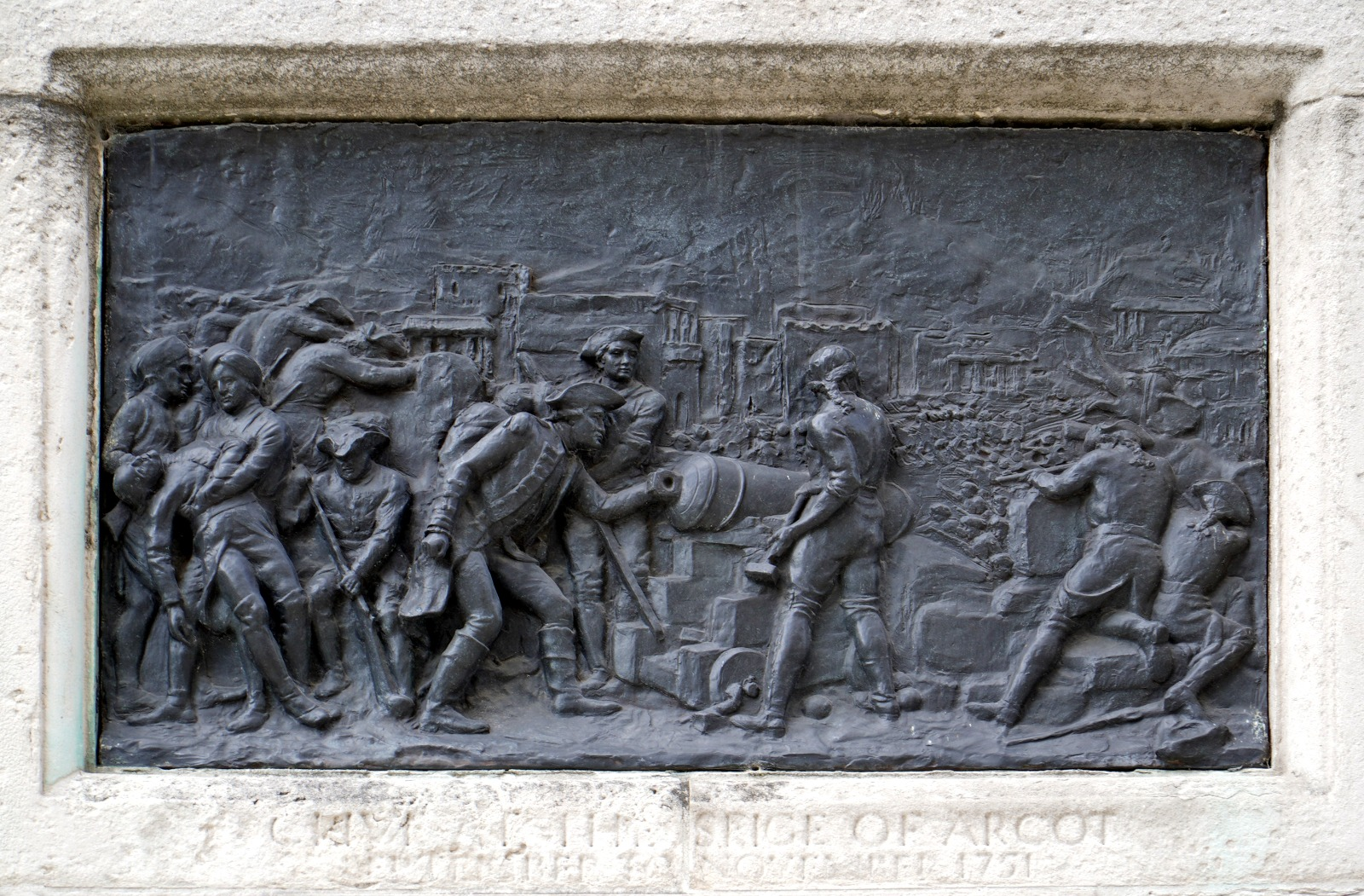
Plinth of the statue of Robert Clive, London, created by John Tweed, depicting the Siege of Arcot

In the summer of 1751, Chanda Sahib left Arcot to besiege Muhammed Ali Khan Wallajah at Trichinopoly. This placed the British at Madras in a precarious position, since the latter was the last of their major allies in the area. The British company's military was also in some disarray, as Stringer Lawrence had returned to England in 1750 over a pay dispute, and much of the company was apathetic about the dangers the expanding French influence and declining British influence posed. The weakness of the British military command was exposed when a force was sent from Madras to support Muhammad Ali at Trichinopoly, but its commander, a Swiss mercenary, refused to attack an outpost at Valikondapuram. Clive, who accompanied the force as commissary, was outraged at the decision to abandon the siege. He rode to Cuddalore, and offered his services to lead an attack on Arcot if he was given a captain's commission, arguing this would force Chanda Sahib to either abandon the siege of Trichinopoly or significantly reduce the force there.

Madras and Fort St. David could supply him with only 200 Europeans, 300 sepoys, and three small cannons; furthermore, of the eight officers who led them, four were civilians like Clive, and six had never been in action. Clive, hoping to surprise the small garrison at Arcot, made a series of forced marches, including some under extremely rainy conditions. Although he did fail to achieve surprise, the garrison, hearing of the march being made under such arduous conditions, opted to abandon the fort and town; Clive occupied Arcot without firing a shot.

The fort was a rambling structure with a dilapidated wall a mile long (too long for his small force to effectively man), and it was surrounded by the densely packed housing of the town. Its moat was shallow or dry, and some of its towers were insufficiently strong to use as artillery mounts. Clive did the best he could to prepare for the onslaught he expected. He made a foray against the fort's former garrison, encamped a few miles away, which had no significant effect. When the former garrison was reinforced by 2,000 men Chanda Sahib sent from Trichinopoly it reoccupied the town on 15 September. That night Clive led most of his force out of the fort and launched a surprise attack on the besiegers. Because of the darkness, the besiegers had no idea how large Clive's force was, and they fled in panic.

The next day Clive learned that heavy guns he had requested from Madras were approaching, so he sent most of his garrison out to escort them into the fort. That night the besiegers, who had spotted the movement, launched an attack on the fort. With only 70 men in the fort, Clive once again was able to disguise his small numbers, and sowed sufficient confusion against his enemies that multiple assaults against the fort were successfully repulsed. That morning the guns arrived, and Chanda Sahib's men again retreated.

Over the next week Clive and his men worked feverishly to improve the defences, aware that another 4,000 men, led by Chanda Sahib's son Raza Sahib and accompanied by a small contingent of French troops, was on its way. (Most of these troops came from Pondicherry, not Trichinopoly, and thus did not have the effect Clive desired of raising that siege.) Clive was forced to reduce his garrison to about 300 men, sending the rest of his force to Madras in case the enemy army decided to go there instead. Raza Sahib arrived at Arcot, and on 23 September occupied the town. That night Clive launched a daring attack against the French artillery, seeking to capture their guns. The attack very nearly succeeded in its object, but was reversed when enemy sniper fire tore into the small British force. Clive himself was targeted on more than one occasion; one man pulled him down and was shot dead. The affair was a serious blow: 15 of Clive's men were killed, and another 15 wounded.

Over the next month the besiegers slowly tightened their grips on the fort. Clive's men were subjected to frequent sniper attacks and disease, lowering the garrison size to 200. He was heartened to learn that some 6,000 Maratha forces had been convinced to come to his relief, but that they were awaiting payment before proceeding. The approach of this force prompted Raza Sahib to demand Clive's surrender; Clive's response was an immediate rejection, and he further insulted Raza Sahib by suggesting that he should reconsider sending his rabble of troops against a British-held position. The siege finally reached critical when Raza Sahib launched an all-out assault against the fort on 14 November. Clive's small force maintained its composure, and established killing fields outside the walls of the fort where the attackers sought to gain entry. Several hundred attackers were killed and many more wounded, while Clive's small force suffered only four British and two sepoy casualties.

The historian Thomas Babington Macaulay wrote a century later of the siege:

... the commander who had to conduct the defence ... was a young man of five and twenty, who had been bred as a book-keeper ... Clive ... had made his arrangements, and, exhausted by fatigue, had thrown himself on his bed. He was awakened by the alarm, and was instantly at his post ... After three desperate onsets, the besiegers retired behind the ditch. The struggle lasted about an hour ... the garrison lost only five or six men.

His conduct during the siege made Clive famous in Europe. The Prime Minister William Pitt the Elder described Clive, who had received no formal military training whatsoever, as the "heaven-born general", endorsing the generous appreciation of his early commander, Major Lawrence. The Court of Directors of the East India Company voted him a sword worth £700, which he refused to receive unless Lawrence was similarly honoured. He was also granted Mughal honorifics, including the title Sabat Jang ("daring in war"), together with a mansab (imperial rank).

Clive and Major Lawrence were able to bring the campaign to a successful conclusion. In 1754, the first of the provisional Carnatic treaties was signed between Thomas Saunders, the Company president at Madras, and Charles Godeheu, the French commander who displaced Dupleix. Mohammed Ali Khan Wallajah was recognised as Nawab, and both nations agreed to equalise their possessions. When war again broke out in 1756, during Clive's absence in Bengal, the French obtained successes in the northern districts, and it was Mohammed Ali Khan Wallajah's efforts which drove them from their settlements. The Treaty of Paris (1763) formally confirmed Mohammed Ali Khan Wallajah as Nawab of the Carnatic. It was a result of this action and the increased British influence that in 1765 a firman (decree) came from the Emperor of Delhi, recognising the British possessions in southern India.

== Marriage and return to England ==
On 18 February 1753 in Madras, Clive married Margaret Maskelyne, sister of the Rev. Dr Nevil Maskelyne, fifth Astronomer Royal. They had nine children:

- Edward Clive, 1st Earl of Powis (1754–1839), succeeded his father
- Richard Clive (4 March 1755 – bur. 19 October 1755), died young
- Jane Clive (15 June 1756 – September 1759), died young
- Robert Clive (13 October 1759 – June 1760), died young
- Hon. Rebecca Clive (15 September 1760 – December 1795), married in 1780 to Lt.-Gen. John Robinson, MP
- Hon. Charlotte Clive (19 January 1762 – 20 October 1795), died unmarried
- Hon. Margaretta Clive (15 August 1763 – August 1814), married 11 April 1780 Lt.-Col. Lambert Theodore Walpole (killed in 1798 Wexford Rebellion), great-nephew of Robert Walpole
- Hon. Elizabeth Clive (30 October 1764 – bur. 18 December 1764), died young
- Lt-Col. Hon. Robert Henry Clive (14 August 1769 – 28 July 1833), died unmarried

Margaret Maskelyne set out to find Clive, who reportedly had fallen in love with her portrait. When she arrived, Clive was a national hero. They were married at St. Mary's Church in (then) Madras on 18 February 1753. They then returned to England.

Clive was then offered command of British forces in North America, but he declined.

From 1754 to 1755, Clive briefly sat as Member of Parliament for the "rotten borough" of St Michael's in Cornwall, which then returned two Members. He and his colleague John Stephenson were later unseated by petition of their defeated opponents, Richard Hussey and Simon Luttrell.

== Second journey to India (1755–1760) ==
In July 1755, Clive returned to India to act as deputy governor of Fort St. David at Cuddalore. He arrived after having lost a considerable fortune en route, as the Doddington, the lead ship of his convoy, was wrecked near Port Elizabeth, losing a chest of gold coins belonging to Clive worth £33,000 (equivalent to £6,500,000 in 2025). Nearly 250 years later in 1998, illegally salvaged coins from Clive's treasure chest were offered for sale, and in 2002 a portion of the coins were given to the South African government after protracted legal wrangling.

Clive, now promoted to lieutenant-colonel in the British Army, took part in the capture of the fortress of Gheriah, a stronghold of the Maratha Admiral Tuloji Angre. The action was led by Admiral James Watson and the British had several ships available, some Royal troops and some Maratha allies. The overwhelming strength of the joint British and Maratha forces ensured that the battle was won with few losses. A fleet surgeon, Edward Ives, noted that Clive refused to take any part of the treasure divided among the victorious forces as was custom at the time.

=== Fall and recapture of Calcutta (1756–1757) ===
Following this action Clive headed to his post at Fort St. David and it was there he received news of twin disasters for the British. Early in 1756, Siraj ud-Daulah had succeeded his grandfather Alivardi Khan as Nawab of Bengal. In June, Clive received news that the new Nawab had attacked the British at Kasimbazar and shortly afterwards on 20 June he had taken the fort at Calcutta. The losses to the Company because of the fall of Calcutta were estimated by investors at £2 million (equivalent to £380,000,000 in 2025). Those British who were captured were placed in a punishment cell which became infamous as the Black Hole of Calcutta. In stifling summer heat, it was reported that 43 of the 64 prisoners died as a result of suffocation or heat stroke. While the Black Hole became infamous in Britain, it is debatable whether the Nawab was aware of the incident.

By Christmas 1756, as no response had been received to diplomatic letters to the Nawab, Admiral Charles Watson and Clive were dispatched to attack the Nawab's army and remove him from Calcutta by force. Their first target was the fortress of Baj-Baj which Clive approached by land while Admiral Watson bombarded it from the sea. The fortress was quickly taken with minimal British casualties. Shortly afterwards, on 2 January 1757, Calcutta itself was taken with similar ease.

Approximately a month later, on 3 February 1757, Clive encountered the army of the Nawab itself. For two days, the army marched past Clive's camp to take up a position east of Calcutta. Sir Eyre Coote, serving in the British forces, estimated the enemy's strength as 40,000 cavalry, 60,000 infantry and thirty cannon. Even allowing for overestimation this was considerably more than Clive's force of approximately 540 British infantry, 600 Royal Navy sailors, 800 local sepoys, fourteen field guns and no cavalry. The British forces attacked the Nawab's camp during the early morning hours of 5 February 1757. In this battle, unofficially called the 'Calcutta Gauntlet', Clive marched his small force through the entire Nawab's camp, despite being under heavy fire from all sides. By noon, Clive's force broke through the besieging camp and arrived safely at Fort William. During the assault, around one tenth of the British attackers became casualties. (Clive reported his losses at 57 killed and 137 wounded.) While technically not a victory in military terms, the sudden British assault intimidated the Nawab. He sought to make terms with Clive, and surrendered control of Calcutta on 9 February, promising to compensate the East India Company for damages suffered and to restore its privileges.

=== War with Siraj Ud Daulah ===
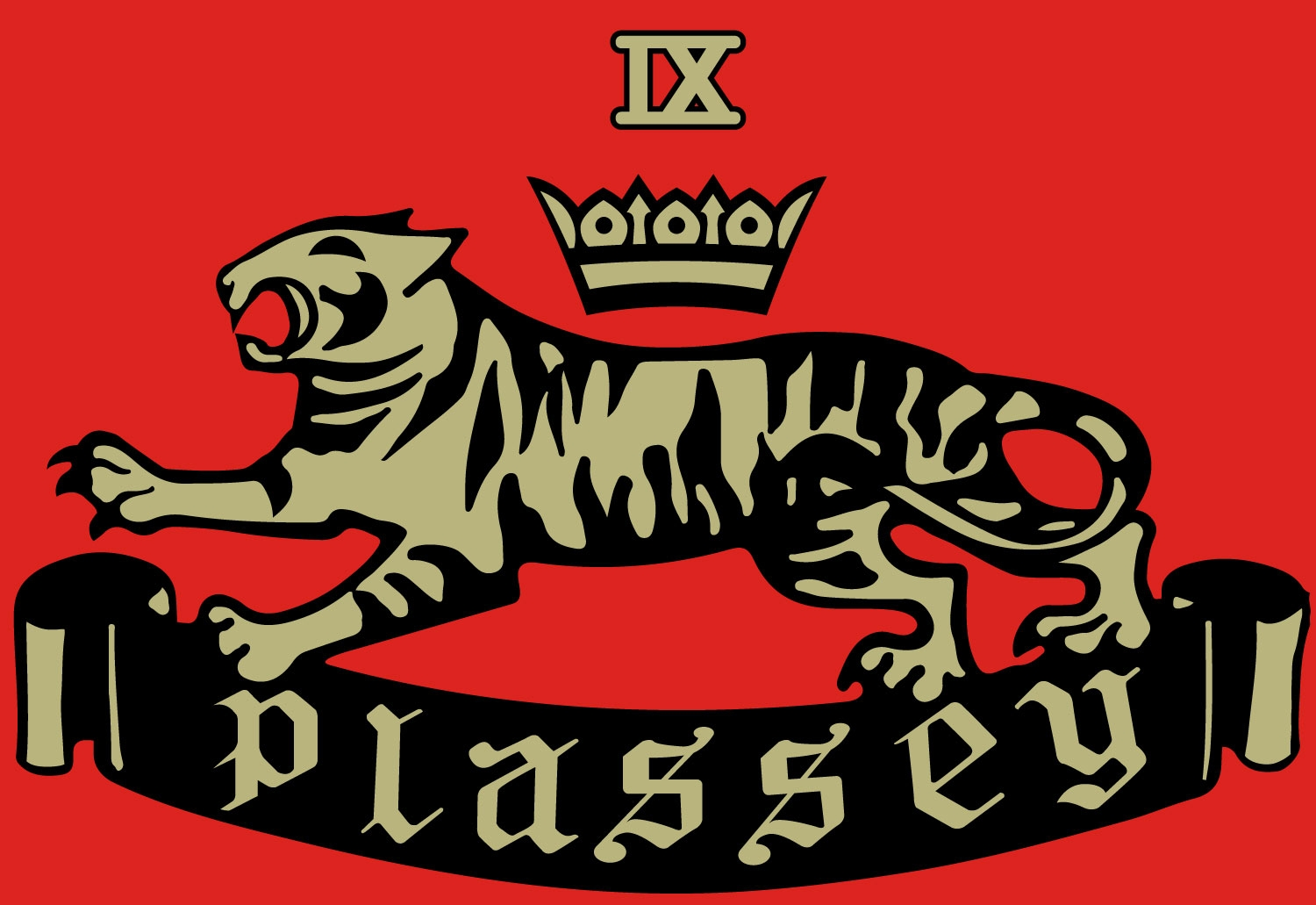
"9 (Plassey) Battery Royal Artillery" of the British Army

As Britain and France were once more at war, Clive sent the fleet up the river against the French colony of Chandannagar, while he besieged it by land. There was a strong incentive to capture the colony, as capture of a previous French settlement near Pondicherry had yielded the combined forces prizes valued at £130,000 (equivalent to £20,200,000 in 2025). After consenting to the siege, the Nawab unsuccessfully sought to assist the French. Some officials of the Nawab's court formed a confederacy to depose him. Mir Jafar, the Nawab's commander-in-chief, led the conspirators. With Admiral Watson, Governor Drake and Mr. Watts, Clive made a gentlemen's agreement in which it was agreed to give the office of viceroy of Bengal, Bihar and Odisha to Mir Jafar, who was to pay £1 million (equivalent to £160,000,000 in 2025) to the company for its losses in Calcutta and the cost of its troops, £500,000 (equivalent to £80,000,000 in 2025) to the British inhabitants of Calcutta, £200,000 (equivalent to £31,000,000 in 2025) to the native inhabitants, and £70,000 (equivalent to £10,900,000 in 2025) to its Armenian merchants.

Clive employed Umichand, a rich trader, as an agent between Mir Jafar and the British officials. Umichand threatened to betray Clive unless he was guaranteed, in the agreement itself, £300,000 (equivalent to £56,400,000 in 2025). To dupe him a fictitious agreement was shown to him with a clause to this effect. Admiral Watson refused to sign it. Clive deposed later to the House of Commons that, "to the best of his remembrance, he gave the gentleman who carried it leave to sign his name upon it; his lordship never made any secret of it; he thinks it warrantable in such a case, and would do it again a hundred times; he had no interested motive in doing it, and did it with a design of disappointing the expectations of a rapacious man."

=== Plassey ===
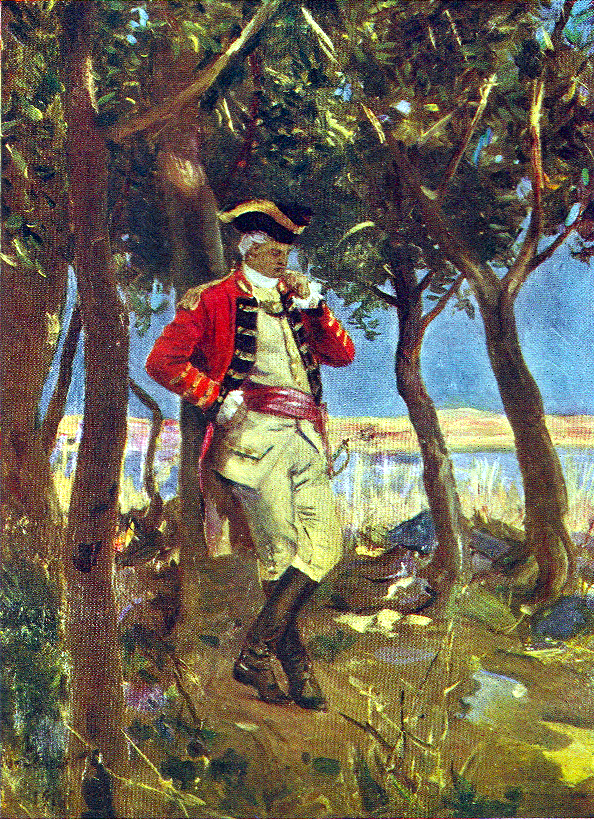
Robert Clive depicted in contemplation beneath a mango grove on the eve of the Battle of Plassey (1757)

The whole hot season of 1757 was spent in negotiations with the Nawab of Bengal. In the middle of June Clive began his march from Chandannagar, with the British in boats and the sepoys along the right bank of the Hooghly River. During the rainy season, the Hooghly is fed by the overflow of the Ganges to the north through three streams, which in the hot months are nearly dry. On the left bank of the Bhagirathi, the most westerly of these, 100 miles (160 km) above Chandernagore, stands Murshidabad, the capital of the Mughal viceroys of Bengal. Some miles farther down is the field of Plassey, then an extensive grove of mango trees.

On 21 June 1757, Clive arrived on the bank opposite Plassey, in the midst of the first outburst of monsoon rain. His whole army amounted to 1,100 Europeans and 2,100 sepoy troops, with nine field-pieces. The Nawab had drawn up 18,000 horse, 50,000-foot and 53 pieces of heavy ordnance, served by French artillerymen. For once in his career Clive hesitated, and called a council of sixteen officers to decide, as he put it, "whether in our present situation, without assistance, and on our own bottom, it would be prudent to attack the Nawab, or whether we should wait till joined by some country (Indian) power." Clive himself headed the nine who voted for delay; Major Eyre Coote led the seven who counselled immediate attack. But, either because his daring asserted itself, or because of a letter received from Mir Jafar, Clive was the first to change his mind and to communicate with Major Eyre Coote. One tradition, followed by Macaulay, represents him as spending an hour in thought under the shade of some trees, while he resolved the issues of what was to prove one of the decisive battles of the world. Another, turned into verse by Sir Alfred Lyall, pictures his resolution as the result of a dream. However that may be, he did well as a soldier to trust to the dash and even rashness that had gained Arcot and triumphed at Calcutta since retreat, or even delay, might have resulted in defeat.

After heavy rain, Clive's 3,200 men and the nine guns crossed the river and took possession of the grove and its tanks of water, while Clive established his headquarters in a hunting lodge. On 23 June, the engagement took place and lasted the whole day, during which remarkably little actual fighting took place. Gunpowder for the cannons of the Nawab was not well protected from rain. That impaired those cannons. Except for the 40 Frenchmen and the guns they worked, the Indian side could do little to reply to the British cannonade (after a spell of rain), which, with the 39th Regiment, scattered the host, inflicting on it a loss of 500 men. Clive had already made a secret agreement with aristocrats in Bengal, including Jagat Seth and Mir Jafar. Clive restrained Major Kilpatrick, for he trusted to Mir Jafar's abstinence, if not desertion to his ranks, and knew the importance of sparing his own small force. He was fully justified in his confidence in Mir Jafar's treachery to his master, for he led a large portion of the Nawab's army away from the battlefield, ensuring his defeat.

Clive lost hardly any European troops; in all 22 sepoys were killed and 50 wounded. It is curious in many ways that Clive is now best-remembered for this battle, which was essentially won by suborning the opposition rather than through fighting or brilliant military tactics. Whilst it established British military supremacy in Bengal, it did not secure the East India Company's control over Upper India, as is sometimes claimed. That would come only seven years later in 1764 at the Battle of Buxar, where Sir Hector Munro defeated the combined forces of the Mughal Emperor and the Nawab of Awadh in a much more closely fought encounter.

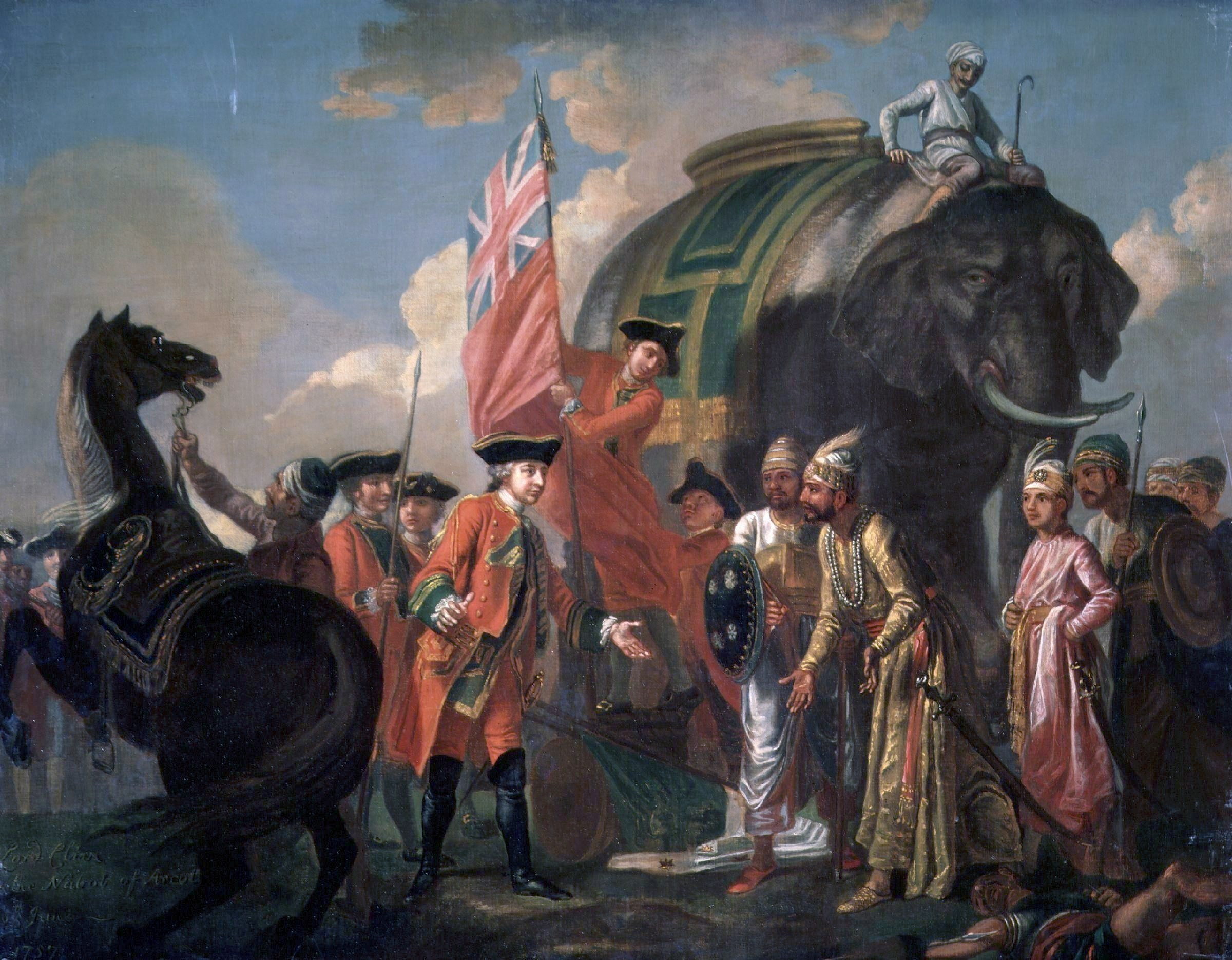
Robert Clive, 1st Baron Clive of Plassey, meeting with Mir Jafar after the Battle of Plassey, by Francis Hayman. National Portrait Gallery, London

Siraj Ud Daulah fled from the field on a camel, securing what wealth he could. He was soon captured by Mir Jafar's forces and later executed by the assassin Mohammadi Beg. Clive entered Murshidabad and established Mir Jafar as Nawab, the price which had been agreed beforehand for his treachery. Clive was taken through the treasury, amid £1.5 million (equivalent to £230,000,000 in 2025) sterling's worth of rupees, gold and silver plate, jewels and rich goods, and besought to ask what he would. Clive took £160,000 (equivalent to £24,800,000 in 2025), a vast fortune for the day, while £500,000 (equivalent to £80,000,000 in 2025) was distributed among the army and navy of the East India Company, and provided gifts of £24,000 (equivalent to £3,700,000 in 2025) to each member of the company's committee, as well as the public compensation stipulated for in the treaty.

In this extraction of wealth Clive followed a usage fully recognised by the company, although this was the source of future corruption which Clive was later sent to India again to correct. The company itself acquired revenue of £100,000 (equivalent to £15,500,000 in 2025) a year, and a contribution towards its losses and military expenditure of £1.5 million sterling (equivalent to £230,000,000 in 2025). Mir Jafar further discharged his debt to Clive by afterwards presenting him with the quit-rent of the company's lands in and around Calcutta, amounting to an annuity of £27,000 (equivalent to £4,200,000 in 2025) for life, and leaving him by will the sum of £70,000 (equivalent to £10,900,000 in 2025), which Clive devoted to the army.

==== Further campaigns ====
===== Battle of Condore =====
While busy with the civil administration, Clive continued to follow up his military success. He sent Major Coote in pursuit of the French almost as far as Benares. He dispatched Colonel Forde to Vizagapatam and the northern districts of Madras, where Forde won the Battle of Condore (1758), pronounced by Broome "one of the most brilliant actions on military record".

===== Mughals =====
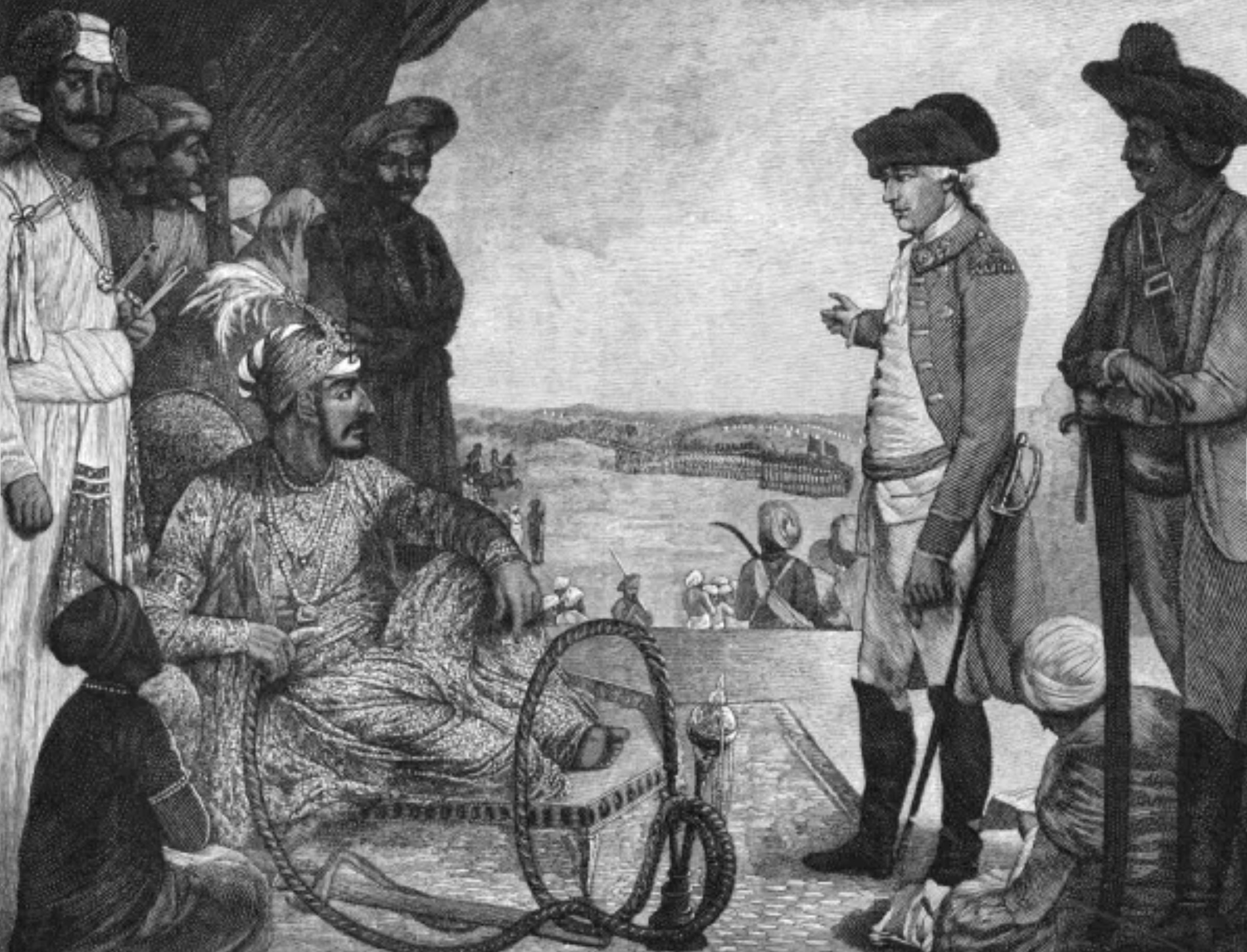
The Mughal Emperor Shah Alam II, as a pensioner of the British East India Company, 1781

Clive came into direct contact with the Mughal himself, for the first time, a meeting which would prove beneficial in his later career. Prince Ali Gauhar escaped from Delhi after his father, the Mughal Emperor Alamgir II, had been murdered by the usurping Vizier Imad-ul-Mulk and his Maratha associate Sadashivrao Bhau.

Prince Ali Gauhar was welcomed and protected by Shuja-ud-Daula, the Nawab of Awadh. In 1760, after gaining control over Bihar, Odisha and some parts of the Bengal, Ali Gauhar and his Mughal Army of 30,000 intended to overthrow Mir Jafar and the Company in order to reconquer the riches of the eastern Subahs for the Mughal Empire. Ali Gauhar was accompanied by Muhammad Quli Khan, Hidayat Ali, Mir Afzal, Kadim Husein and Ghulam Husain Tabatabai. Their forces were reinforced by the forces of Shuja-ud-Daula and Najib-ud-Daula. The Mughals were also joined by Jean Law and 200 Frenchmen, and waged a campaign against the British during the Seven Years' War.

Prince Ali Gauhar successfully advanced as far as Patna, which he later besieged with a combined army of over 40,000 in order to capture or kill Ramnarian, a sworn enemy of the Mughals. Mir Jafar was terrified at the near demise of his cohort and sent his own son Miran to relieve Ramnarian and retake Patna. Mir Jafar also implored the aid of Robert Clive, but it was Major John Caillaud, who defeated and dispersed Prince Ali Gauhar's army.

===== Dutch aggression =====
While Clive was preoccupied with fighting the French, the Dutch directors of the outpost at Chinsurah, not far from Chandernagore, seeing an opportunity to expand their influence, agreed to send additional troops to Chinsurah. Despite Britain and the Dutch Republic not formally being at war, a Dutch fleet of seven ships, containing more than fifteen hundred European and Malay troops, came from Batavia and arrived at the mouth of the Hooghly River in October 1759, while Mir Jafar, the Nawab of Bengal, was meeting with Clive in Calcutta. They met a mixed force of British and local troops at Chinsurah, just outside Calcutta. The British, under Colonel Francis Forde, defeated the Dutch in the Battle of Chinsurah, forcing them to withdraw. The British engaged and defeated the ships the Dutch used to deliver the troops in a separate naval battle on 24 November. Thus Clive avenged the massacre of Amboyna—the occasion when he wrote his famous letter; "Dear Forde, fight them immediately; I will send you the order of council to-morrow".

Meanwhile, Clive improved the organisation and drill of the sepoy army, after a European model, and enlisted into it many Muslims from upper regions of the Mughal Empire. He re-fortified Calcutta. In 1760, after four years of hard labour, his health gave way and he returned to England. "It appeared", wrote a contemporary on the spot, "as if the soul was departing from the Government of Bengal". He had been formally made Governor of Bengal by the Court of Directors at a time when his nominal superiors in Madras sought to recall him to their help there. But he had discerned the importance of the province even during his first visit to its rich delta, mighty rivers and teeming population. Clive selected some able subordinates, notably a young Warren Hastings, who, a year after Plassey, was made Resident at the Nawab's court.

The long-term outcome of Plassey was to place a very heavy revenue burden upon Bengal. The company sought to extract the maximum revenue possible from the peasantry to fund military campaigns, and corruption was widespread amongst its officials. Mir Jafar was compelled to engage in extortion on a vast scale in order to replenish his treasury, which had been emptied by the company's demand for an indemnity of 2.8 crores of rupees (£3 million).

== Return to the British isles ==
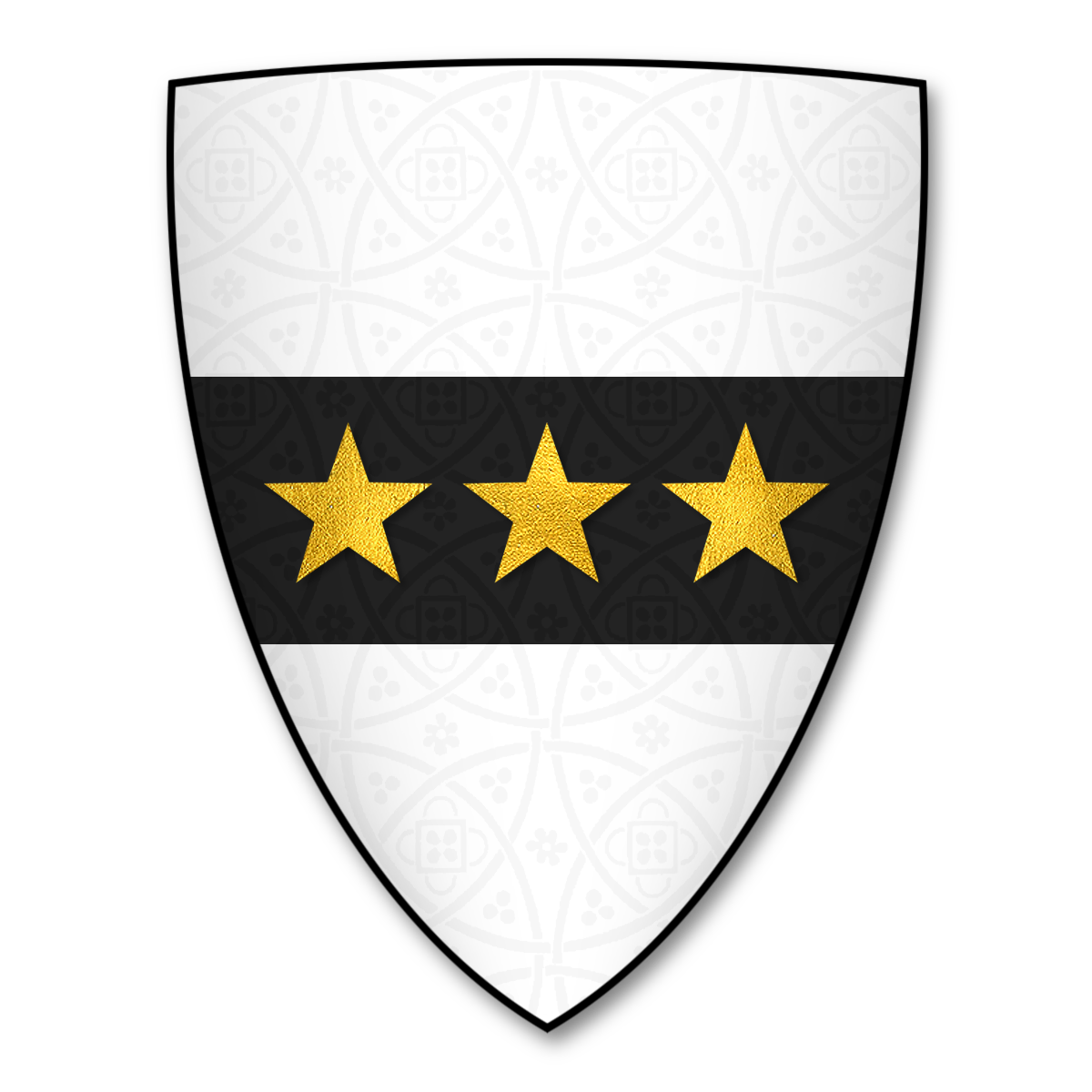

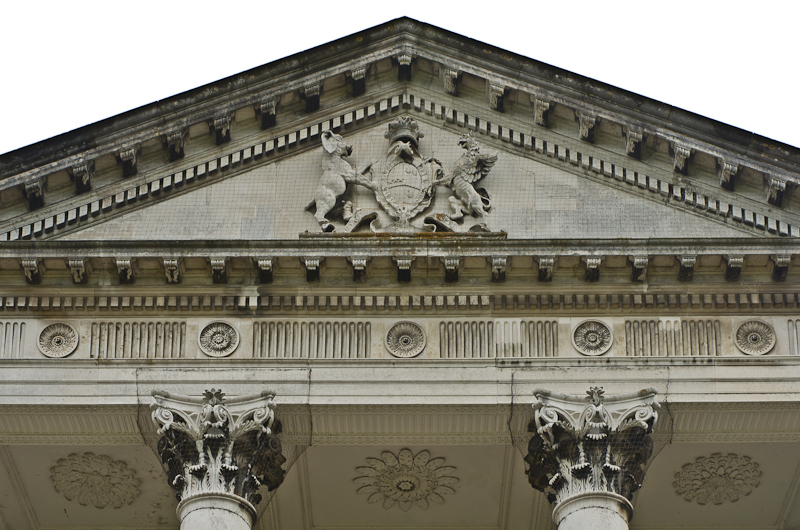
Robert Clive's coat of arms (left) and the arms in relief at Claremont (above)

In 1760, the 35-year-old Clive returned to Great Britain with a fortune of at least £300,000 (equivalent to £52,400,000 in 2025) and the quit-rent of £27,000 (equivalent to £4,700,000 in 2025) a year. He financially supported his parents and sisters, while also providing Major Lawrence, the commanding officer who had early encouraged his military genius, with a stipend of £500 (equivalent to £100,000 in 2025) a year. In the five years of his conquests and administration in Bengal, the young man had crowded together a succession of exploits that led Lord Macaulay, in what that historian termed his "flashy" essay on the subject, to compare him to Napoleon Bonaparte, declaring that "[Clive] gave peace, security, prosperity and such liberty as the case allowed of to millions of Indians, who had for centuries been the prey of oppression, while Napoleon's career of conquest was inspired only by personal ambition, and the absolutism he established vanished with his fall." Macaulay's ringing endorsement of Clive seems more controversial today, as some would argue that Clive's ambition and desire for personal gain set the tone for the administration of Bengal until the Permanent Settlement 30 years later. The immediate consequence of Clive's victory at Plassey was an increase in the revenue demand on Bengal by at least 20%, which led to considerable hardship for the rural population, particularly during the famine of 1770.

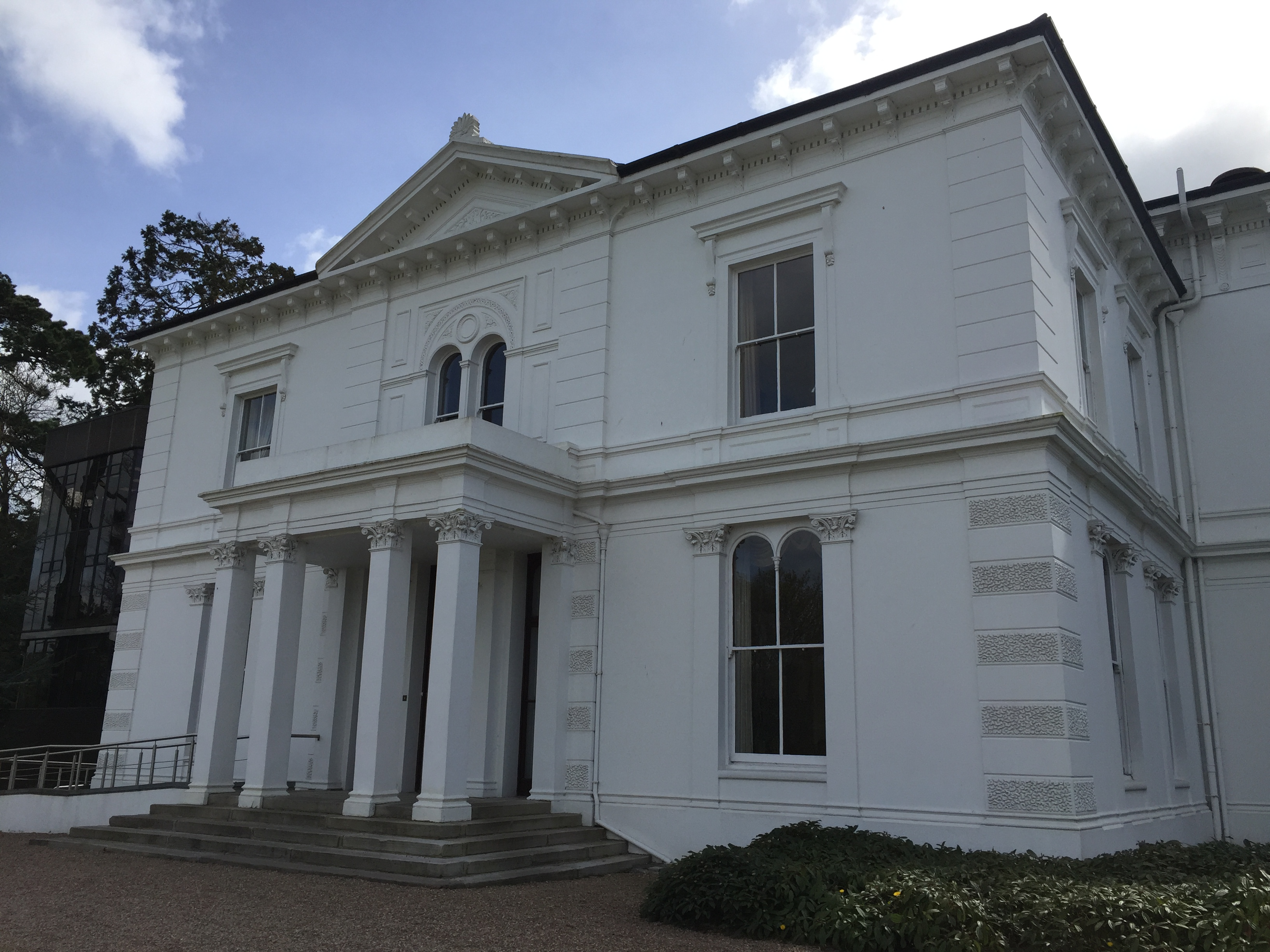
Plassey House, now part of the University of Limerick

In 1762 Clive was awarded an Irish peerage, created Baron Clive of Plassey, County Clare; he bought lands in County Limerick and County Clare, Ireland. Thomas Maunsell (1726–1814), an officer who had fought under Clive at the Battle of Plassey, bought lands near Limerick that he named Plassey, County Limerick. In 1970 these lands were acquired by a precursor of the University of Limerick, whose main administrative centre is now Plassey House. Despite a popular myth, Clive never owned the land.

During the three years that Clive remained in the British isles, he sought a political position, chiefly so that he might influence the course of events in India, which he had left full of promise. He had been well received at court, was elevated to the peerage, had bought estates, and returned a few friends as well as himself to the House of Commons. Clive was MP for Shrewsbury from 1761 until his death. He was allowed to sit in the Commons because his peerage was Irish. He was also elected Mayor of Shrewsbury for 1762–63. Clive received an honorary degree as DCL from Oxford University in 1760, and in 1764 he was appointed Knight of the Order of the Bath.

Clive set himself to reform the home system of the East India Company, and began a bitter dispute with the chairman of the Court of Directors, Laurence Sulivan, whom he defeated in the end. In this he was aided by the news of reverses in Bengal. Mir Jafar had finally rebelled over payments to British officials, and Clive's successor had put Qasim Ali Khan, Mir Jafar's son-in-law upon the musnud (throne). After a brief tenure, Mir Qasim had fled, ordering Walter Reinhardt Sombre (known to the Muslims as Sumru), a Swiss mercenary of his, to butcher the garrison of 150 British at Patna, and had disappeared under the protection of his brother, the Viceroy of Awadh. The whole company's service, civil and military, had become mired in corruption, demoralised by gifts and by the monopoly of inland and export trade, to such an extent that the Indians were pauperised, and the company was plundered of the revenues Clive had acquired. For this Clive himself must bear much responsibility, as he had set a very poor example during his tenure as Governor. Nevertheless, the Court of Proprietors, forced the Directors to hurry Lord Clive to Bengal with the double powers of Governor and Commander-in-Chief.

== Third journey to India (1765–1767) ==
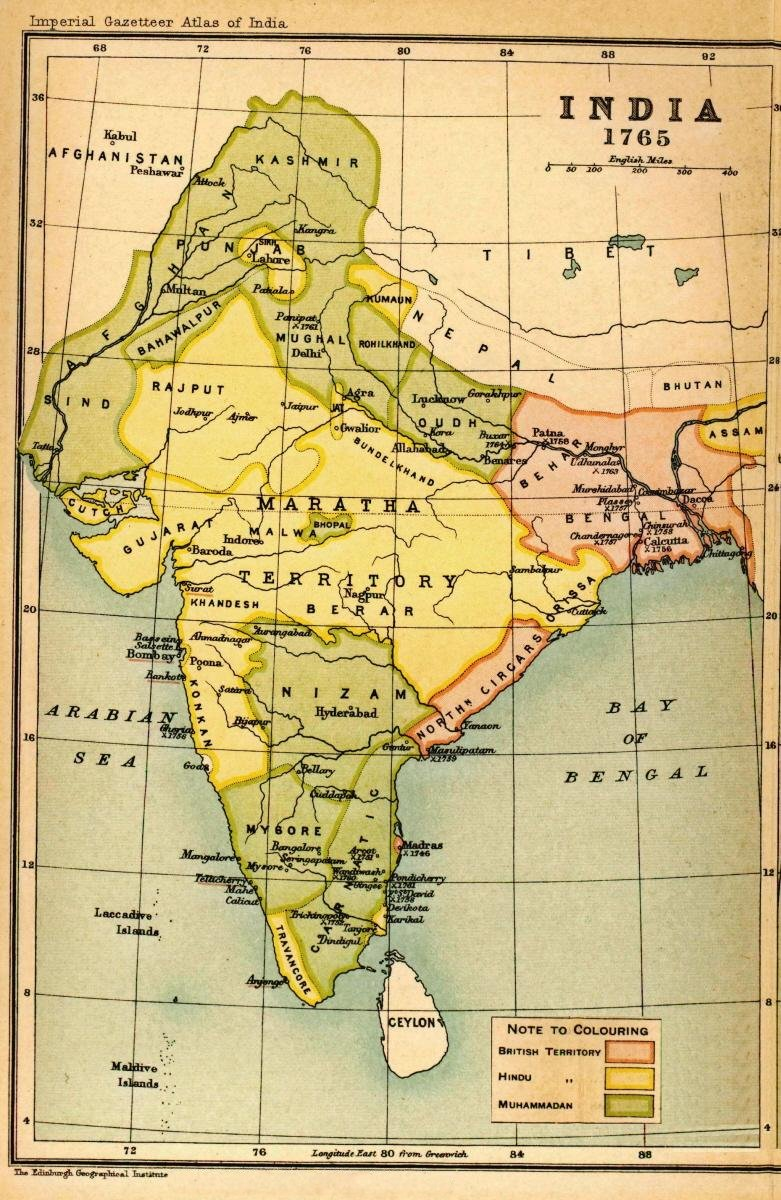
Map of India in 1765, showing the territory administered by the East India Company (pink): Bengal and the Northern Circars, during the time of Clive

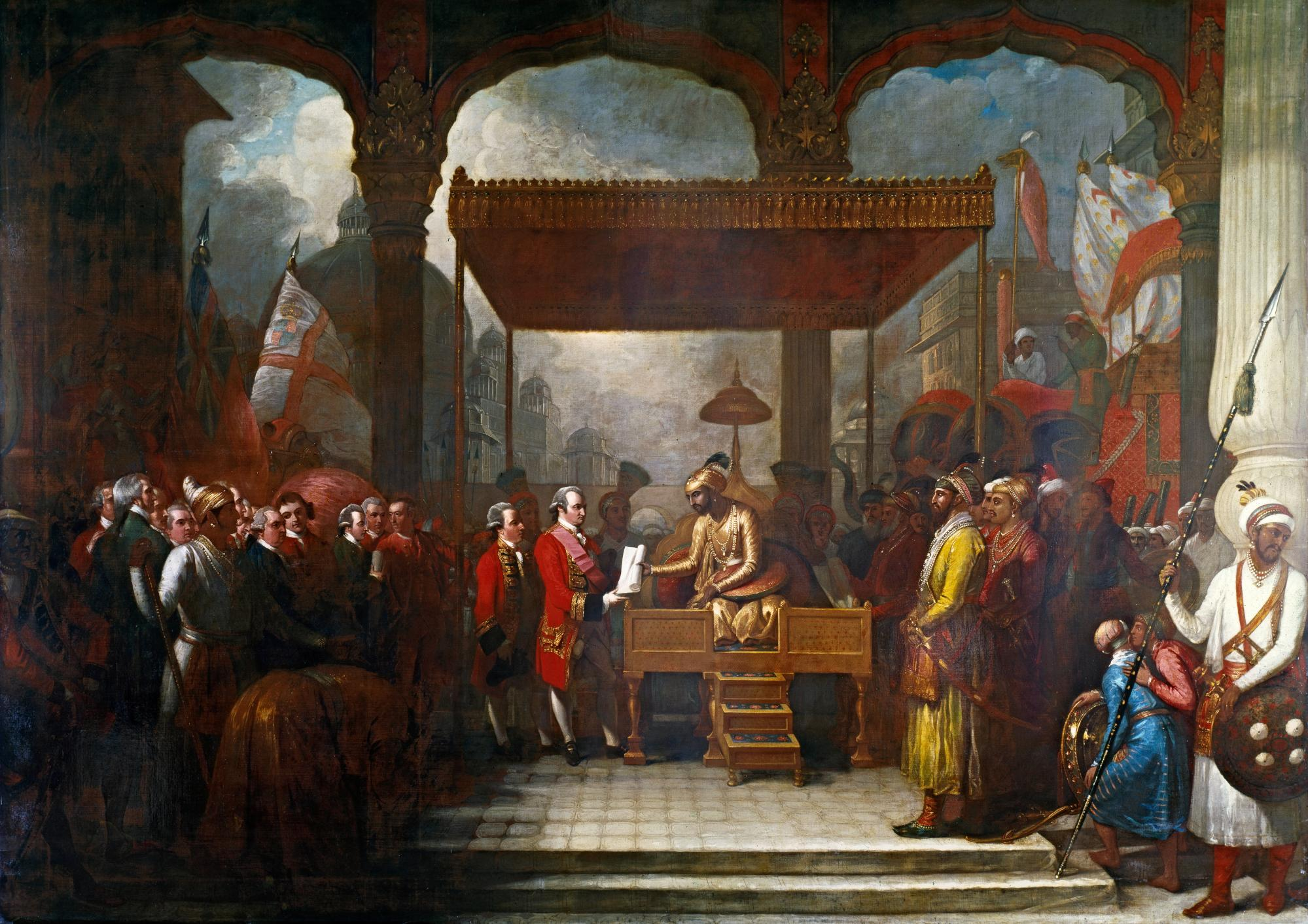
Robert Clive receiving the grant of the Diwani (revenue administration) from Emperor Shah Alam II, 1765

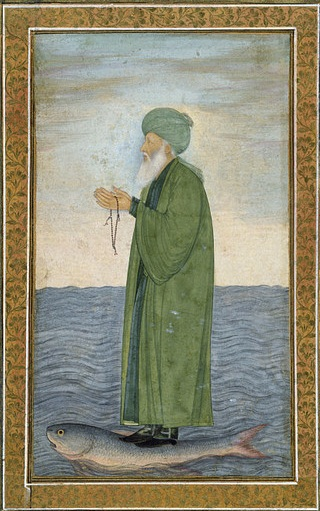
Miniature of Al-Khidr, from the "Small Clive Album" thought to have been given to Clive on his 1765–67 visit to India by Shuja ud-Daula, the Nawab of Awadh. The album contains 62 folia of Mughal miniature paintings, drawing and floral pattern studies. The binding is from Indian brocade silk brought home by the 2nd Lord Clive, who served as Governor of Madras, 1799 to 1803. Acquired by the Victoria and Albert Museum in 1956.

On 11 April 1765, Clive's ship docked at Madras. Upon learning of Mir Jafar's death and the aftermath of the Battle of Buxar, he sent a coded letter to a friend back in England, directing him to mortgage all his property and to buy as much stock in the Company as possible before the news broke, anticipating that its value would rise. On 3 May 1765 Clive landed at Calcutta to learn that Mir Jafar left him personally £70,000 (equivalent to £10,700,000 in 2025). Mir Jafar was succeeded by his son-in-law Kasim Ali, though not before the government had been further demoralised by taking £100,000 (equivalent to £15,300,000 in 2025) as a gift from the new Nawab; while Kasim Ali had induced not only the viceroy of Awadh, but the emperor of Delhi himself, to invade Bihar. At this point a mutiny in the Bengal army occurred, which was a grim precursor of the Indian rebellion of 1857, but on this occasion it was quickly suppressed by blowing the sepoy ringleader from a gun. Major Munro, "the Napier of those times", scattered the united armies on the hard-fought field of Buxar. The emperor, Shah Alam II, detached himself from the league, while the Awadh viceroy threw himself on the mercy of the British.

Clive had now an opportunity of repeating in Hindustan, or Upper India, what he had accomplished in Bengal. He might have secured what is now called Uttar Pradesh, and have rendered unnecessary the campaigns of Wellesley and Lake. But he believed he had other work in the exploitation of the revenues and resources of rich Bengal itself, making it a base from which British India would afterwards steadily grow. Hence he returned to the Awadh viceroy all his territory save the provinces of Allahabad and Kora, which he presented to the weak emperor.

=== Mughal Firman ===
In return for the Awadhian provinces Clive secured from the emperor one of the most important documents in British history in India, effectively granting title of Bengal to Clive. It appears in the records as "firman from the King Shah Aalum, granting the diwani rights of Bengal, Bihar and Odisha to the Company 1765." The date was 12 August 1765, the place Benares, the throne an English dining-table covered with embroidered cloth and surmounted by a chair in Clive's tent. It is all pictured by a Muslim contemporary, who indignantly exclaims that so great a "transaction was done and finished in less time than would have been taken up in the sale of a jackass". By this deed the Company became the real sovereign rulers of thirty million people, yielding a revenue of £4 million sterling (equivalent to £610,000,000 in 2025).

On the same date Clive obtained not only an imperial charter for the Company's possessions in the Carnatic, completing the work he began at Arcot, but a third firman for the highest of all the lieutenancies of the empire, that of the Deccan itself. This fact is mentioned in a letter from the secret committee of the court of directors to the Madras government, dated 27 April 1768.

The British presence in India was still tiny compared to the number and strength of the princes and people of India, but also compared to the forces of their ambitious French, Dutch and Danish rivals. Clive had this in mind when he penned his last advice to the directors, as he finally left India in 1767:

We are sensible that, since the acquisition of the dewany, the power formerly belonging to the soubah of those provinces is totally, in fact, vested in the East India Company. Nothing remains to him but the name and shadow of authority. This name, however, this shadow, it is indispensably necessary we should seem to venerate.

=== Attempts at administrative reform ===
Having thus founded the Empire of British India, Clive sought to put in place a strong administration. The salaries of civil servants were increased, the acceptance of gifts from Indians was forbidden, and Clive exacted covenants under which participation in the inland trade was stopped. Unfortunately this had very little impact in reducing corruption, which remained widespread until the days of Warren Hastings. Clive's military reforms were more effective. He put down a mutiny of the British officers, who chose to resent the veto against receiving presents and the reduction of batta (extra pay) at a time when two Maratha armies were marching on Bengal. His reorganisation of the army, on the lines of that which he had begun after Plassey, neglected during his absence in Great Britain, subsequently attracted the admiration of Indian officers. He divided the whole army into three brigades, making each a complete force, in itself equal to any single Indian army that could be brought against it.

Clive was also instrumental in making the company virtual master of North India by introducing his policy of "Dual system of government". According to the new arrangement enforced by him, the company became liable only for revenue affairs of Bengal (Diwani) and Bihar while the administration and law and order was made a prerogative of the Nawab. An office of "Deputy Nawab" was created, who was at the helms of all the affairs vis a vis revenue of two of the richest provinces of India besides being the company's representative while the Nizamat (Law and order) remained in the hands of the Nawab who appointed his own representative to deal with the company. This system proved to be detrimental for the administration of Bengal and ultimately the "Dual system of government" was abolished by Clive.

== Retirement ==
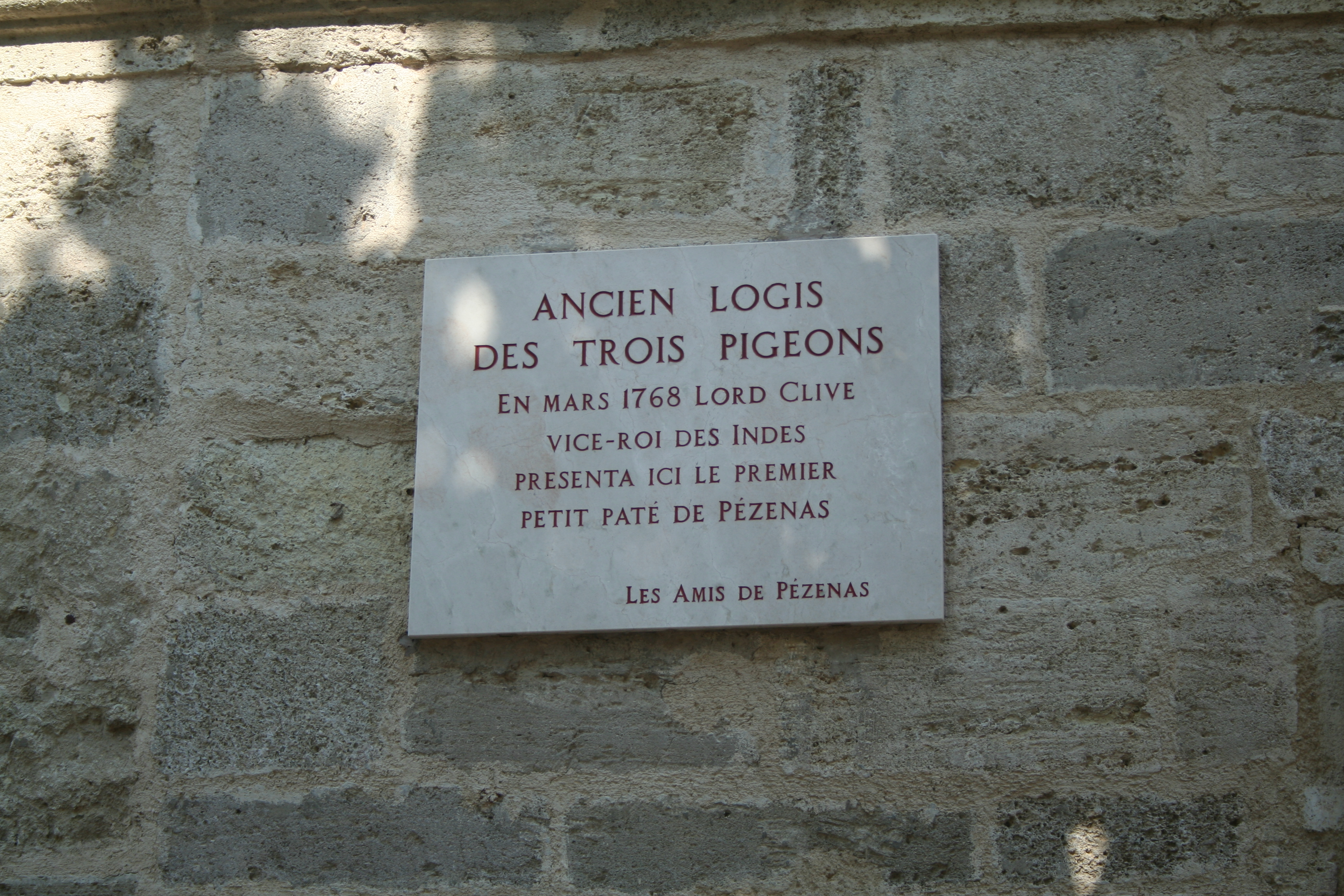
Plaque in memory of Lord Clive in Pézenas

Clive left India for the last time in February 1767. In 1768, he lived at the Chateau de Larzac in Pézenas, Hérault, Languedoc-Roussillon, in southern France. Local tradition is that he introduced local bakers to a sweet pastry, Petit pâté de Pézenas, and that he (or his chef) had brought the recipe from India as a refined version of the savoury keema naan. Pézenas is known for such delicacies.

Later in 1768, Clive was elected a Fellow of the Royal Society and served as treasurer of the Royal Salop Infirmary in Shrewsbury.

In 1769, he acquired the house and gardens of Claremont near Esher in Surrey, and commissioned Capability Brown to remodel the garden and house.

A great famine killed about a third of the population of Bengal between 1769 and 1773. It was argued at the time, notably by Adam Smith, that East India Company officials caused the famine due to bad management, particularly their abuse of trade monopoly and land tax for personal gain. These revelations and subsequent debates in Parliament reduced Clive's political popularity.

In 1772 Parliament opened an inquiry into the East India Company's practices in India. Clive's political opponents turned these hearings into attacks on Clive. Questioned about some of the large sums of money he had received while in India, Clive pointed out that they were not contrary to accepted Company practice, and defended his behaviour by stating that he had foregone opportunities for greater gain, concluding memorably: "I stand astonished at my own moderation." The hearings highlighted the need for reform of the Company; but a vote to censure Clive for his actions failed. Later in 1772, Clive was invested Knight of the Bath (eight years after he had been made knight bachelor), and was appointed Lord Lieutenant of Shropshire.

Clive continued to be involved in Parliamentary discussions on company reforms. In 1773, General John Burgoyne, one of Clive's most vocal critics, pressed the case that some of Clive's gains were made at the expense of the Company and of the government. Clive again made a spirited defence of his actions, and closed his testimony by stating: "Take my fortune, but save my honour." The vote that followed exonerated Clive, who was commended for the "great and meritorious service" he rendered to the country. Immediately thereafter Parliament began debating the Regulating Act, which significantly reformed the East India Company's practices.

== Death ==
On 22 November 1774, at the age of 49, Clive died at his home on Berkeley Square in London after cutting his throat with a paper knife. No inquest was carried out, and contemporary newspapers reported the death as due to an apoplectic fit or stroke.

The cause of his death has long been the subject of controversy. The timing coincided with particular illness; Clive suffered severe stomach pain and gout, and had been particularly ill in previous days, seeing a doctor and taking laudanum. Immediately prior to his death he had withdrawn from a game of whist, saying he was suffering from violent stomach pains. Biographer John Watney concluded ambiguously: "He did not die from a self-inflicted wound ... He died as he severed his jugular with a blunt paper knife brought on by an overdose of drugs". David Livett Prior claimed that Clive took a large dose of opium to relieve his severe pain, causing a fatal seizure. More generally, whilst wealthy and active (recently having completed the Grand Tour), Clive was receiving considerable personal criticism and attack. William Dalrymple mentions that Clive had suffered from acute depression from an early age, and had tried to take his own life twice in his youth. During his Indian stint depression also troubled him. He was morose, and spoke little. Samuel Johnson wrote that Clive "had acquired his fortune by such crimes that his consciousness of them impelled him to cut his own throat". Clive left no suicide note.

According to H. V. Bowen, Clive's funeral was arranged normally, which, he writes, "does not suggest that the family entertained any great concern about the religious consequences of death by suicide." Harvey, however, indicates that the burial was arranged hastily "and in shame" because of Clive's suspected suicide. He was buried inside the parish church of St. Margaret at Moreton Say on 30 November; a small plaque with the words Primis in Indis ('first in India' in Latin) marks his presence in the church. After his death, a satirical cartoon in a London newspaper represented him as 'Lord Vulture', picking the bones of the Indian dead, perhaps referring to the Bengal famine.

== Criticism ==
Clive's actions in India have been criticised by modern historians, particularly his economic management which contributed to the Bengal Famine of 1770, which killed between one and ten million people. Changes caused by Clive to the Indian revenue system and agricultural practices, designed to maximize profits for the East India Company, increased poverty in Bengal. Clive himself commented on the poor conditions of Bengal under Company rule,

I shall only say that such a scene of anarchy, confusion, bribery, corruption, and extortion was never seen or heard of in any country but Bengal; nor did such and so many fortunes acquire in so unjust and rapacious a manner. The three provinces of Bengal, Bihar and Orissa producing a clear revenue of £3 million sterling, have been under the absolute management of the company's servants, ever since Mir Jafar's restoration to the subahship; and they have, both civil and military, exacted and levied contributions from every man of power and consequence, from the Nawab down to the lowest zamindar.

In January 2021, the private school that Clive attended, Merchant Taylors' School, renamed Clive House to "Raphael House" (after the sportsman John Edward Raphael). Petitions have called for removal of a statue of Clive from The Square in Shrewsbury. No more than 20,000 signatures supported such a move, and on 16 July 2020 Shropshire Council voted 28–17 to retain the statue. A similar petition for removal of Clive's statue from outside the Foreign and Commonwealth Office in Whitehall, accrued some 80,000 signatures.

In light of criticism of Clive's legacy, in 2020 Haberdashers' Adams school in Newport, Shropshire announced that Clive House was to be renamed "Owen House" (after the Shropshire poet Wilfred Owen).

== Legacy ==
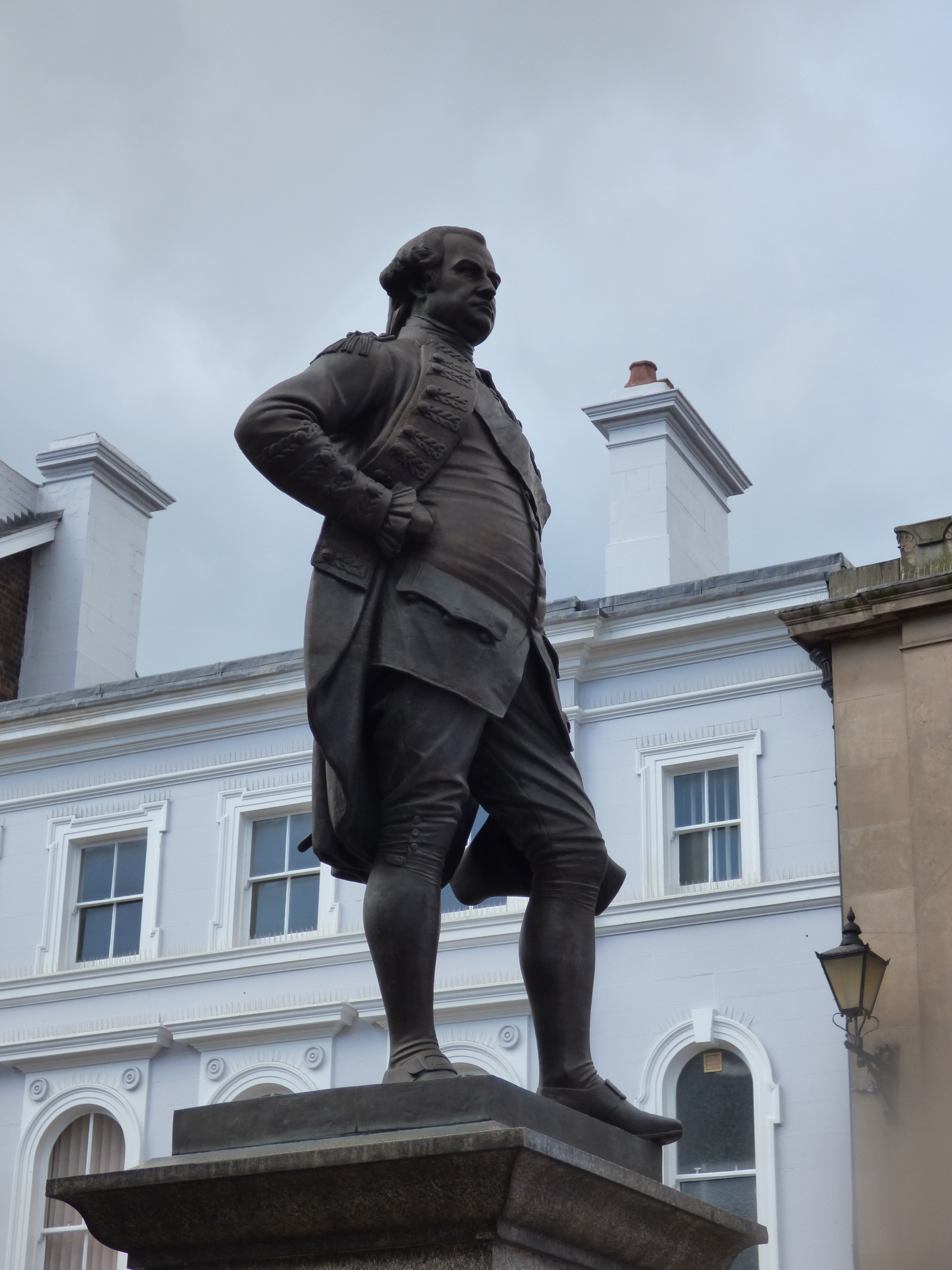
Statue of Clive in Shrewsbury Square

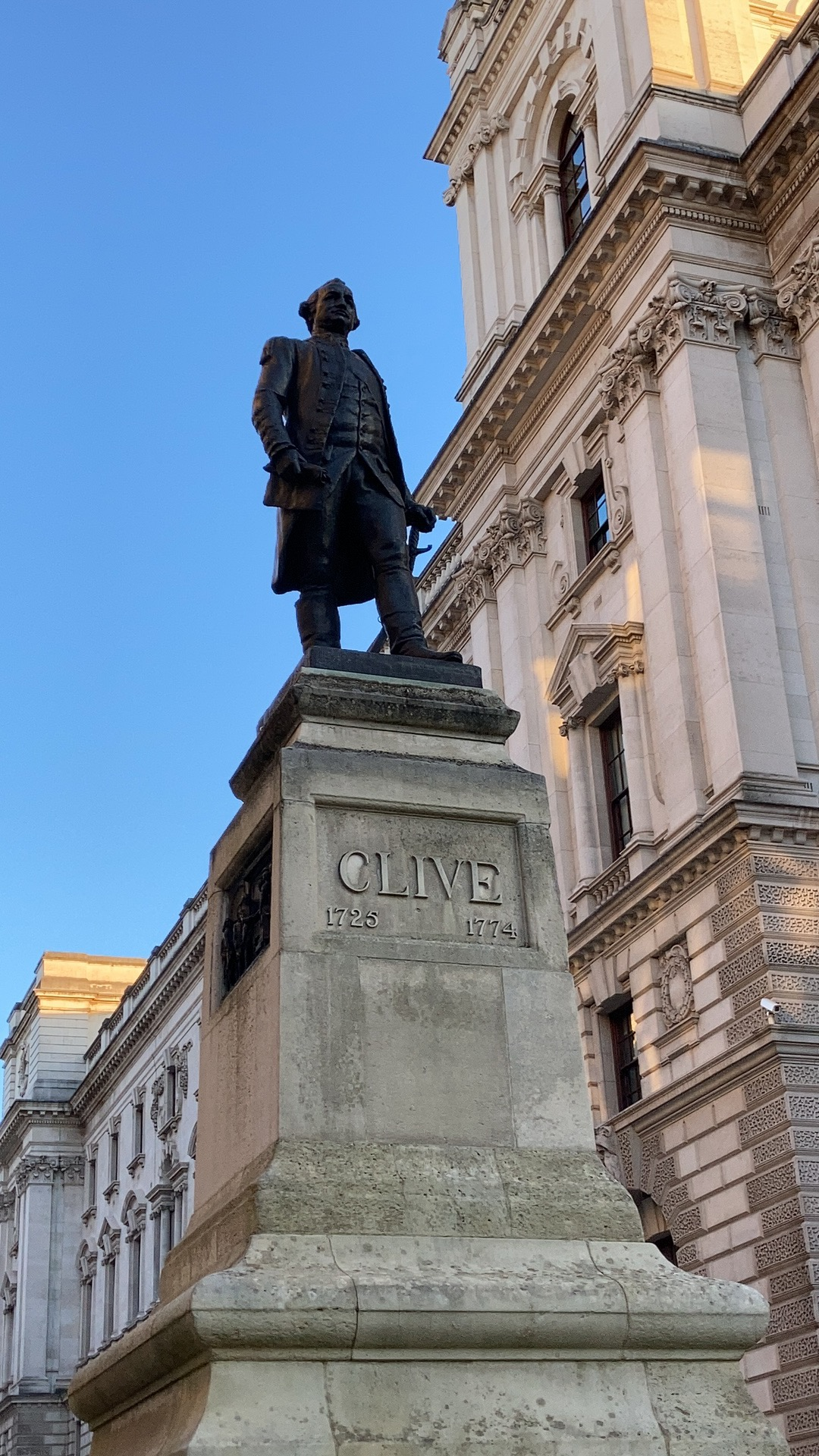
A later statue of Clive in King Charles Street London

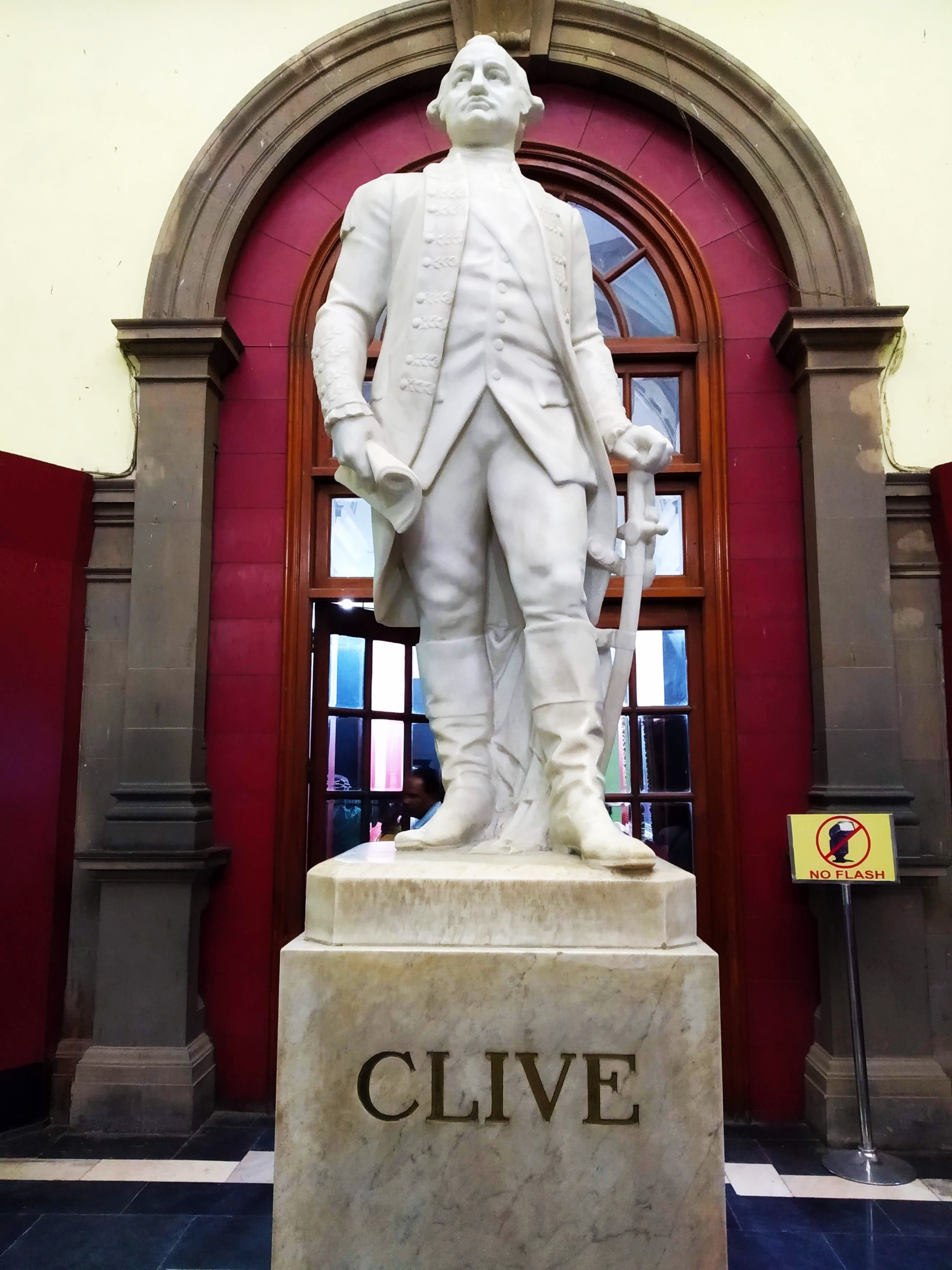
Robert Clive Statue in Victoria Memorial, Kolkata

- Robert Clive's desk from his time at Market Drayton Grammar School is on display at Market Drayton museum complete with his carved initials. The town also has a Clive Road.
- Robert Clive's pet Aldabra giant tortoise died on 23 March 2006 in the Kolkata zoo. The tortoise, whose name was "Adwaita" (meaning the "One and Only" in Bengali), appeared to be 150–250 years old. Adwaita had been in the zoo since the 1870s and the zoo's documentation showed that he came from Clive's estate in India.
- A statue of Clive stands in the main square in the market town of Shrewsbury, as well as a later one in King Charles Street near St James's Park, London.
- Clive's coat of arms can be seen (impaled with his wife's) in relief in the pediment at Claremont in Esher, Surrey, which Clive had rebuilt.
- Robert Clive established the first slaughterhouse in India, in Calcutta in 1760.
- With the re-capture of Calcutta by Clive in 1756, the cultivation of poppies for the opium trade soon came to be the mainstay of the East India Trading Company's commerce with Imperial China.
- Clive is responsible for opening the first organized brothel within the Army cantonment of Calcutta. He was not interested in eradication of prostitution but in regulation so that their own soldiers and sailors could be protected from venereal diseases. However, two properties in central Calcutta owned by women named Ishwari and Bhobi, whom the Company identified as prostitutes, were seized in 1753.

=== Cultural ===
- Robert Browning's 1880 poem Clive recounts a fictional episode in which Clive, as a young clerk, duels a card-sharping soldier. Clive shoots and misses; the cheat then admits his crime and spares Clive's life. The poem's narrator, and those watching the duel, initially believe that the episode shows Clive's courage in standing up honestly; but Clive rebukes them that the magnanimous cheat showed far more honour. The poem largely focuses on the relationship between courage and fear, and closes with an allusion to Clive's suicide ("Clive's worst deed – we'll hope condoned").
- A bestselling children's novel, G. A. Henty's With Clive in India: Or, the Beginnings of an Empire (1884), celebrates Clive's life and career from a pro-British point of view.
- R. J. Minney's stage play Clive of India (1933) portrays the life of Clive, particularly focusing on his victory at the Battle of Plassey. It was based on a biography of Clive that Minney had written two years earlier.
- The 1935 film Clive of India, based on Minney's play, starred Ronald Colman, Loretta Young, and Clive's descendant Colin Clive.
- Due to being the brother-in-law of Nevil Maskelyne, Clive is mentioned in Thomas Pynchon's novel Mason & Dixon—specifically during the sections with Mason and Maskelyne on the island of Saint Helena.

=== Namesakes ===
- "Clive of India" is a brand of curry powder manufactured in Australia by McKenzie's Foods.
- "Clive" was a house at Merchant Taylors' School, Northwood, where he was a student for seven years before his expulsion. Members were distinguished by their red striped ties. In January 2021 the house was renamed after former pupil and sportsman John Raphael.
- Clive is a Senior Girls house at the Duke of York's Royal Military School, where all houses are named after prominent military figures.
- Clive was a house at Haberdashers' Adams school in Newport, Shropshire which in 2021 was renamed Owen house, after the poet and soldier Wilfred Owen who was born near Oswestry in Shropshire. This follows criticism of Robert Clive in light of the George Floyd protests.
- Clive Road, in West Dulwich, London, commemorates Baron Clive despite being so named close to a century after his death. Following the completion of the relocation of The Crystal Palace from Hyde Park to what is now Upper Norwood in 1854, the West End of London and Crystal Palace Railway was opened on 10 June 1854 to cope with crowds visiting the Crystal Palace. This led to a huge increase in employment in the area and a subsequent increase in the building of residential properties. Many of the new roads were named after eminent figures in British imperial history, such as Robert Clive.
- The settlement of Clive in the Hawke's Bay province of New Zealand is named after Robert Clive.

== Notes ==
Military offices
Preceded by John Adlercron	Commander-in-Chief, India; 1756–1760	Succeeded by John Caillaud
Preceded by John Carnac	Commander-in-Chief, India; 1765–1767	Succeeded by Richard Smith
Honorary titles
Preceded by The Earl of Powis	Lord Lieutenant of Shropshire; 1772–1774	Succeeded by The Lord Clive
Preceded by The Earl of Powis	Lord Lieutenant of Montgomeryshire; 1773–1774	Succeeded by The Earl of Hertford
Peerage of Ireland
New creation	Baron Clive; 1762–1774	Succeeded by Edward Clive
Parliament of Great Britain
Preceded by Thomas Clarke; Arnold Nesbitt	Member of Parliament for Mitchell; 1754–1755; With: John Stephenson	Succeeded by Simon Luttrell; Richard Hussey
Preceded by Thomas Hill; Robert More	Member of Parliament for Shrewsbury; 1761–1774; With: Thomas Hill 1761–1768; Noel Hill 1768–1774; Charlton Leighton 1774	Succeeded by William Pulteney; John Corbet
