= Battle of Trichinopolly =

The Battle of Trichinopolly (also spelled Trichinopoly) may refer to one of several conflicts fought in or near present-day Tiruchirappalli, Tamil Nadu, India:

- Battle of Trichinopoly (1682), the capture of Trichinopoly by Maratha forces under Sambhaji
- Siege of Trichinopoly (1741), the siege and capture of Trichinopoly by the Maratha Empire under Raghuji Bhonsle
- Siege of Trichinopoly (1743), the siege and capture of Trichinopoly by Nizam of Hyderabad
- Siege of Trichinopoly (1751-1752), the siege of Trichinopoly during the Second Carnatic War
- Battle of Golden Rock, a 1753 battle during the Second Carnatic War
- Siege of Trichinopoly (1757), see Ahmad Shah Bahadur

== See also ==
- Siege of Trichinopoly (disambiguation)
- Tiruchirappalli (disambiguation)
