= Kattubava Mosque =

Mosque in Pudukkottai, Tamil Nadu, India

- Location of the mosque in Tamil Nadu

Religion
- Affiliation: Sunni Islam
- Sect: Sufism
- Festival: Urs (during Rabi-ul-Akhir)
- Ecclesiastical or organizational status: Mosque
- Status: Active

Location
- Location: Kathvapallivasal, Pudukkottai district, Tamil Nadu
- Country: India
- Interactive map of Kattubava Mosque
- Coordinates: 10°11′34″N 78°41′48″E

Architecture
- Type: Mosque architecture
- Style: Indo-Islamic
- Founder: Muhammad Ali Khan Wallajah
- Completed: 17th century

Specifications
- Dome: One
- Minaret: Two (maybe more)
- Shrine: One (Bava Fakruddin)

The Kattubava Mosque, also known as the Kattubava Pallivasal, is a Sufi mosque located in the village of Kathvapallivasal, in the Pudukkottai district of the state of Tamil Nadu, India. The mosque is situated 30 kilometres (19 mi) from Pudukkottai on the Thirumayam-Madurai highway.

== Overview ==
Constructed in the 17th century by Arcot Nawab Muhammad Ali Khan Wallajah in the Indo-Islamic style, the mosque contains the tomb of Sufi saint Bava Fakruddin, and is an important Islamic pilgrimage centre. It is famous for its urs which occurs during Rabi-ul-Akhir.

The entrance to the mosque is through an arched gateway flanked by tall minarets. Inside, the mosque features a vast prayer hall with rows of columns supporting a vaulted ceiling, topped by a large dome. The mihrab is decorated with blue and white tiles.

== See also ==
- Islam in India
- List of mosques in India
