= Haldon Belvedere =

Historic tower in Devon, England

Coordinates: 50°39′51″N 3°35′34″W

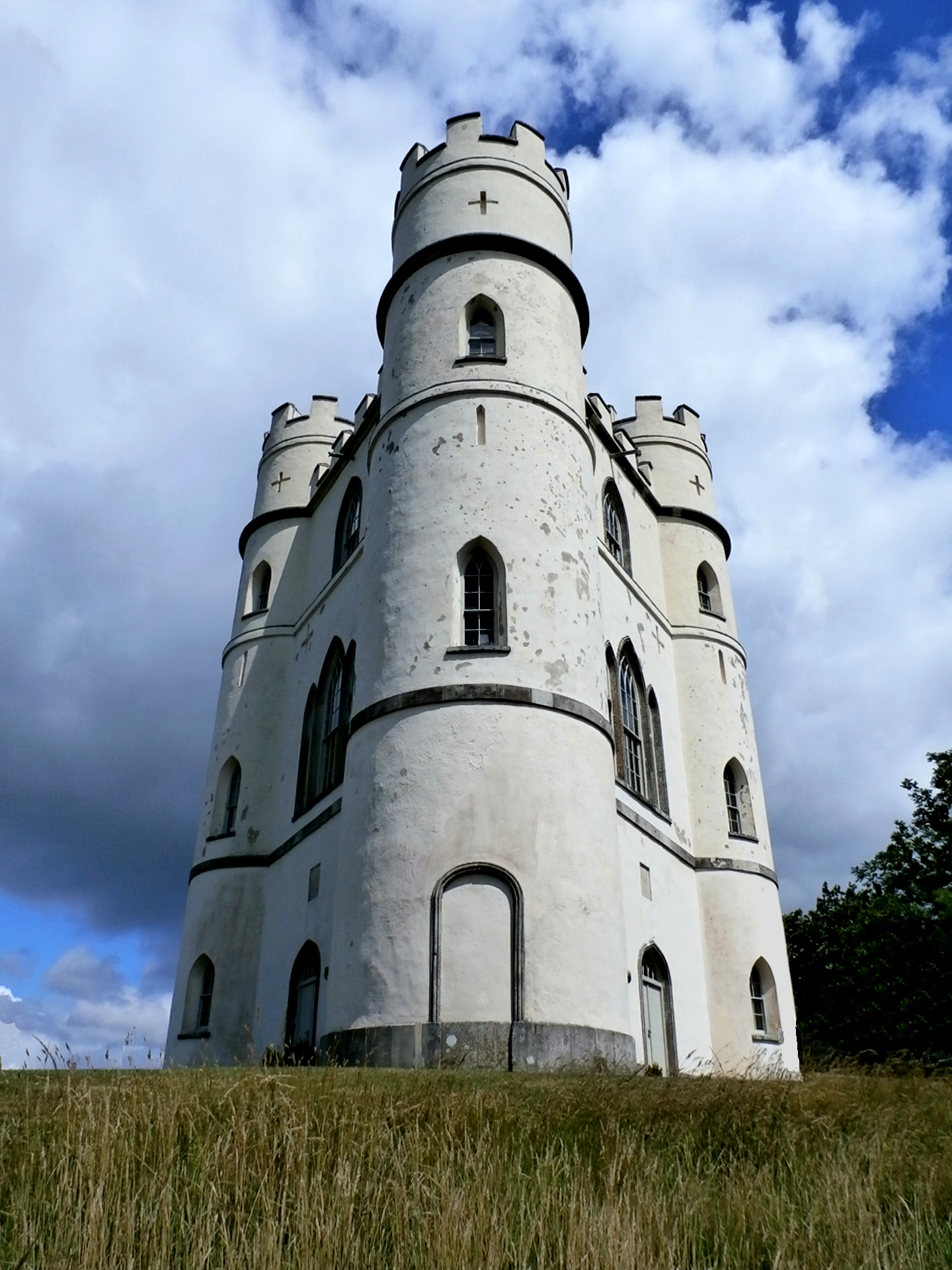
Haldon Belvedere, view from west

Haldon Belvedere or Lawrence Tower is a triangular tower in the Haldon Hills in the county of Devon, England.

Haldon Belvedere is in the parish of Dunchideock within the former Haldon estate, about a mile south-west of Haldon House. Its location on the ridge of the Haldon Hills gives it extensive views and means it is a prominent landmark for many miles around. It was built in 1788 by Sir Robert Palk, 1st Baronet and was originally called Lawrence Tower in honour of his friend and patron General Stringer Lawrence (1697–1775). Lawrence spent much of his retirement at Haldon and was buried in Dunchideock church, in which Palk erected a monument to his memory, having received a bequest of £50,000 in his will. Stringer Lawrence's other monument is in Westminster Abbey, erected by the East India Company.

The tower, 26 metres high, is triangular with Gothic windows and full-height circular angle turrets, and was probably influenced by the triangular tower at nearby Powderham Castle, itself probably modelled on Shrubs Hill Tower (now Fort Belvedere) in Windsor Great Park, built 1750–1755. Inside is a larger-than-life-size coade stone statue of Stringer Lawrence dressed as a Roman general; a copy of the marble statue of him by Peter Scheemakers (1691–1781) now in the Foreign and Commonwealth Office, formerly the India Office. On the walls are three large framed tablets inscribed with details of his career.

In 1925 when the former Palk-owned Haldon estate was being broken up, the belvedere was sold for £300 at auction to J. Archibald Lucas and J. B. Orchard, both of Exeter. It was later owned by Mrs Bessie Smith who sold it in 1933 for £650 to Mrs Annie Dale from Wolverhampton. Mrs Dale and her three sons lived at the belvedere and opened it to the public, running a teahouse and gift shop and charging 2d. to climb to the top of the tower. During World War II the Dale sons were conscientious objectors and were jailed for a time, later being allowed to work locally for the war effort. With its far-reaching views, the belvedere served as a strategic observation post and after the war, Mrs Dale was awarded £405 for damage caused to the building's interior, with damage caused to the stairs by hobnail boots being specifically mentioned.

After the war and the death of their parents, two of the sons, Cyril and Edward, continued to live in the building, but having few means they were unable to maintain it well and it deteriorated. It was struck by lightning in 1960 and in 1990 the windows were blown out in a storm. Cyril Dale died in 1990 and just before his own death in 1994 his brother Edward transferred the building to the Stringer Lawrence Memorial Trust which arranged for restoration work by the Devon Historic Buildings Trust. After extensive work funded by grants from a number of sources including English Heritage, the belvedere was officially reopened by Lucinda Lambton on 20 April 1996. Further restoration of the exterior took place in 2016. It has been a grade II* listed building, under the name of "Lawrence Castle", since 1987.

== 1789 description by Swete ==
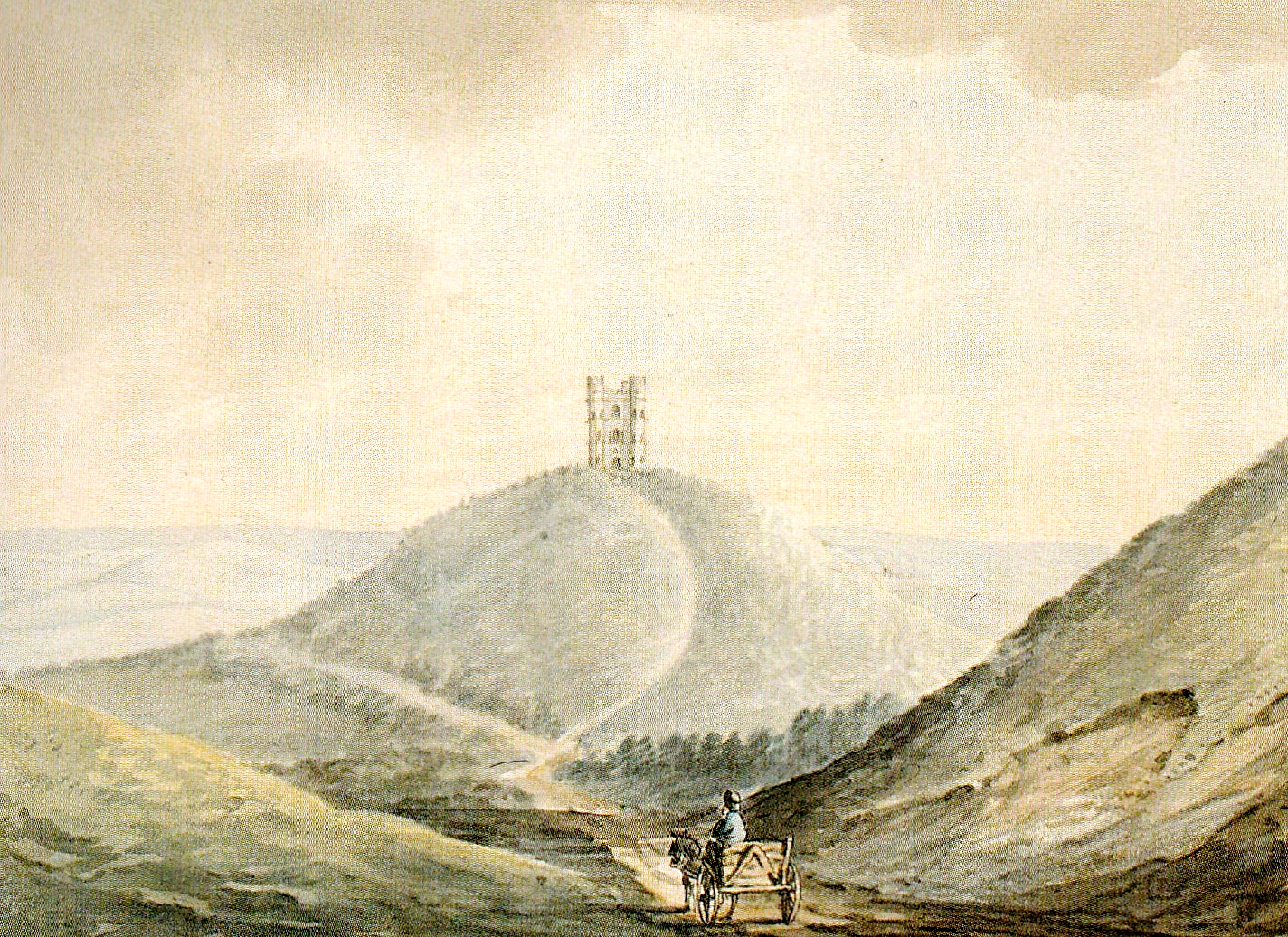
"Tower on Pen Hill", 1792 watercolour (from 1789 sketch) by Rev. John Swete (died 1821). View from south; one of the earliest surviving images of the Haldon Belvedere

Rev. John Swete (died 1821), of nearby Oxton House, visited the tower in September 1789 and recorded in his Journal as follows:

"As we were now on our departure from Haldown on the descent of its northern extremity, we had before us a triangular tower raised by Sir Robert Palk and devoted to the memory of his friend General Lawrence. It had a round tower at each angle and rose three stories high. From its own elevation and that of the conical hill on which it was placed it became an object to the most distant parts of the county; it is hardly possible to conceive a spot better adapted to an edifice of this nature than this of Pen Hill, denominated so by the Britons on account of its eminence. I took the opposite sketch from the road from whence the pine-clad hill and the tower were seen in great perfection".

The previously "wild and bare" Haldon Hills had recently been planted with trees by Sir Robert Palk, which today surround the tower and cover the hill. Swete entered the tower and made transcripts of the three memorial tablets to Stringer Lawrence, and also transcribed the epitaph to him by Hannah More on his monument in nearby Dunchideock Church.

== Sources ==
- Cherry, Bridget & Pevsner, Nikolaus, The Buildings of England: Devon. Yale University Press, 2004. ISBN 978-0-300-09596-8
- Fraser, Iain (2008). The Palk Family of Haldon House & Torquay. Newton Abbot: Sylverwood Publishing. ISBN 0 9545121 4 6.
- Gray, Todd & Rowe, Margery (Eds.), Travels in Georgian Devon: The Illustrated Journals of The Reverend John Swete, 1789–1800, 4 vols., Tiverton: Devon Books, 1999.
- Pidsley, Rev. Christopher, The Tower on the Hill
