= Belvedere (structure) =

Architectural structure sited to take advantage of a fine or scenic view

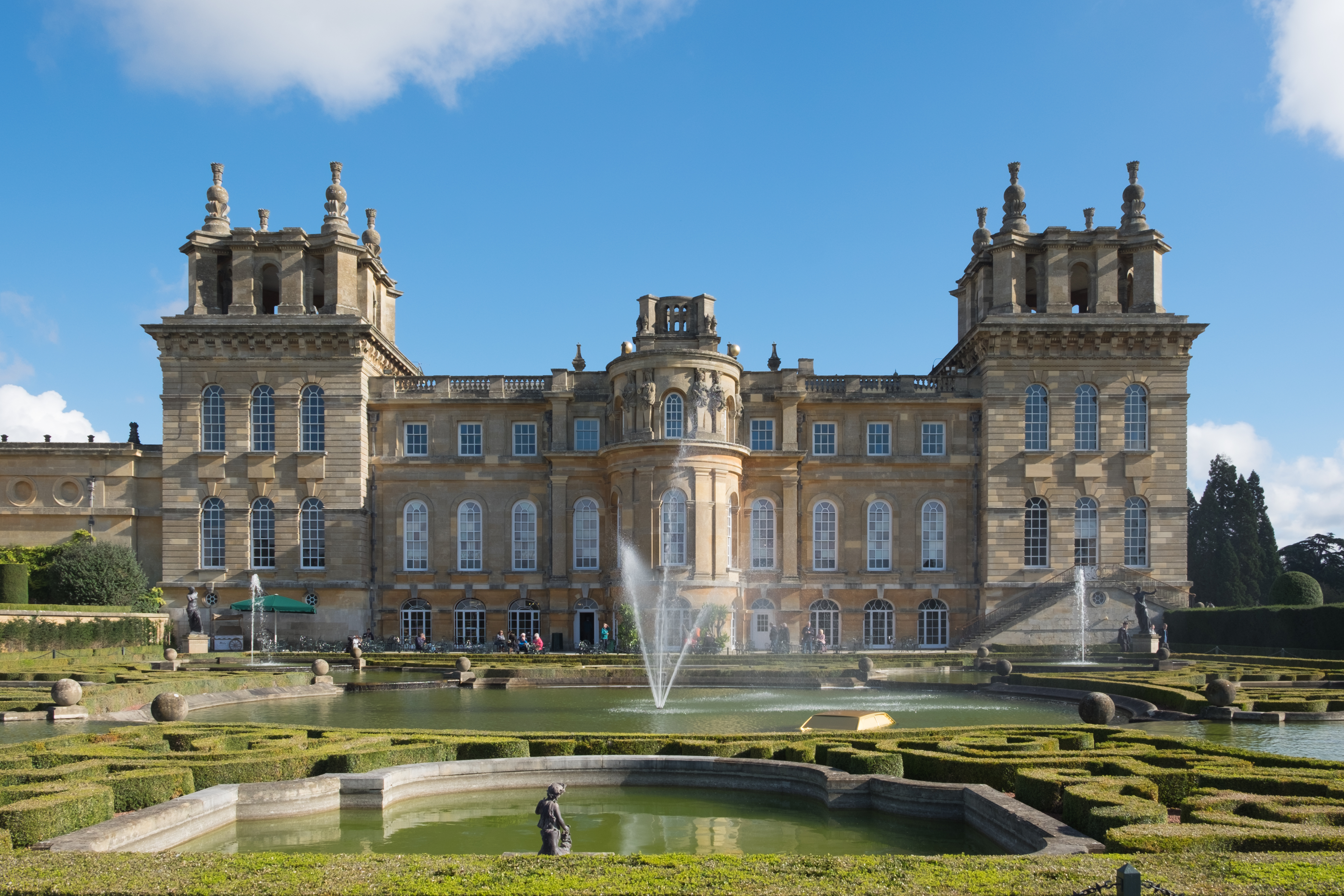
Belvederes crown the two towers at the outer corners of Blenheim Palace, United Kingdom

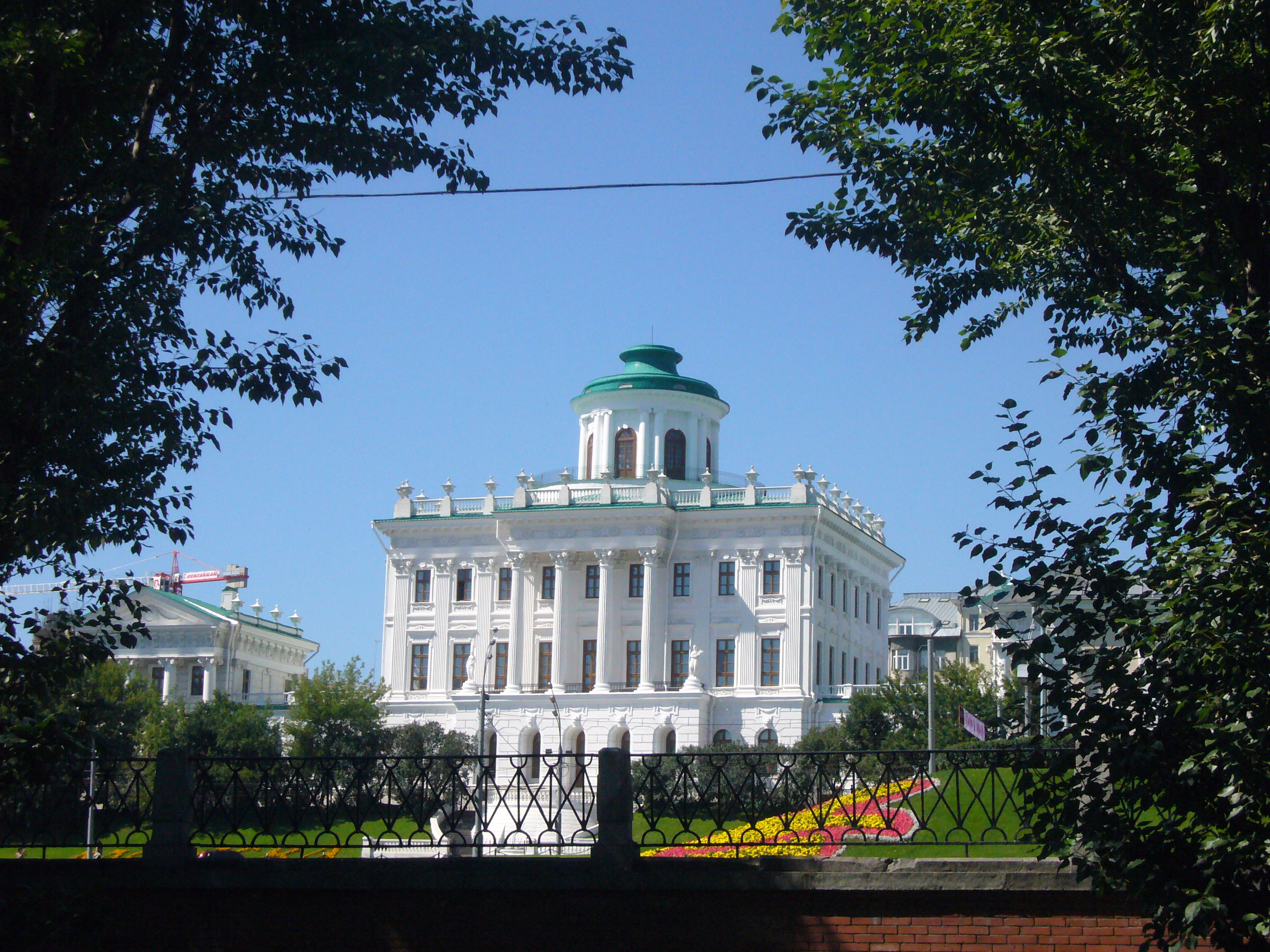
Pashkov House in Moscow, Russia, crowned with a belvedere

A belvedere (/ˈbɛlvəˌdɪər/ BEL-və-deer; Italian for 'beautiful view') or belvidere is an architectural structure sited to take advantage of a fine or scenic view. The term has been used both for rooms in the upper part of a building or structures on the roof, or a separate pavilion in a garden or park. The actual structure can be of any form or style, including a turret, a cupola or an open gallery. The term may be also used for a paved terrace or just a place with a good viewpoint, but no actual building.

It has also been used as a name for a whole building, as in the Belvedere, Vienna, a huge palace, or Belvedere Castle, a folly in Central Park in New York.

== Examples ==
On the hillside above the Vatican Palace (c. 1480–1490), Antonio del Pollaiuolo built a small pavilion (casino in Italian) named the palazzetto or the Belvedere for Pope Innocent VIII. Some years later, on a commission from Pope Julius II, Donato Bramante linked the Vatican with the Belvedere by creating the Cortile del Belvedere ("Courtyard of the Belvedere"), in which stood the Apollo Belvedere, among the most famous of antique sculptures. This began the fashion in the 16th century for the belvedere.

== Gallery ==
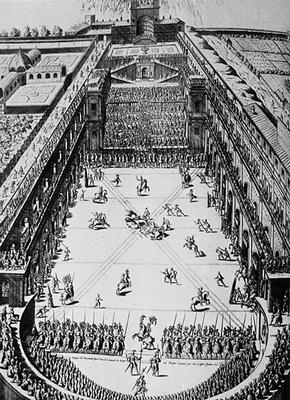
A carousel in the Cortile del Belvedere, 1565

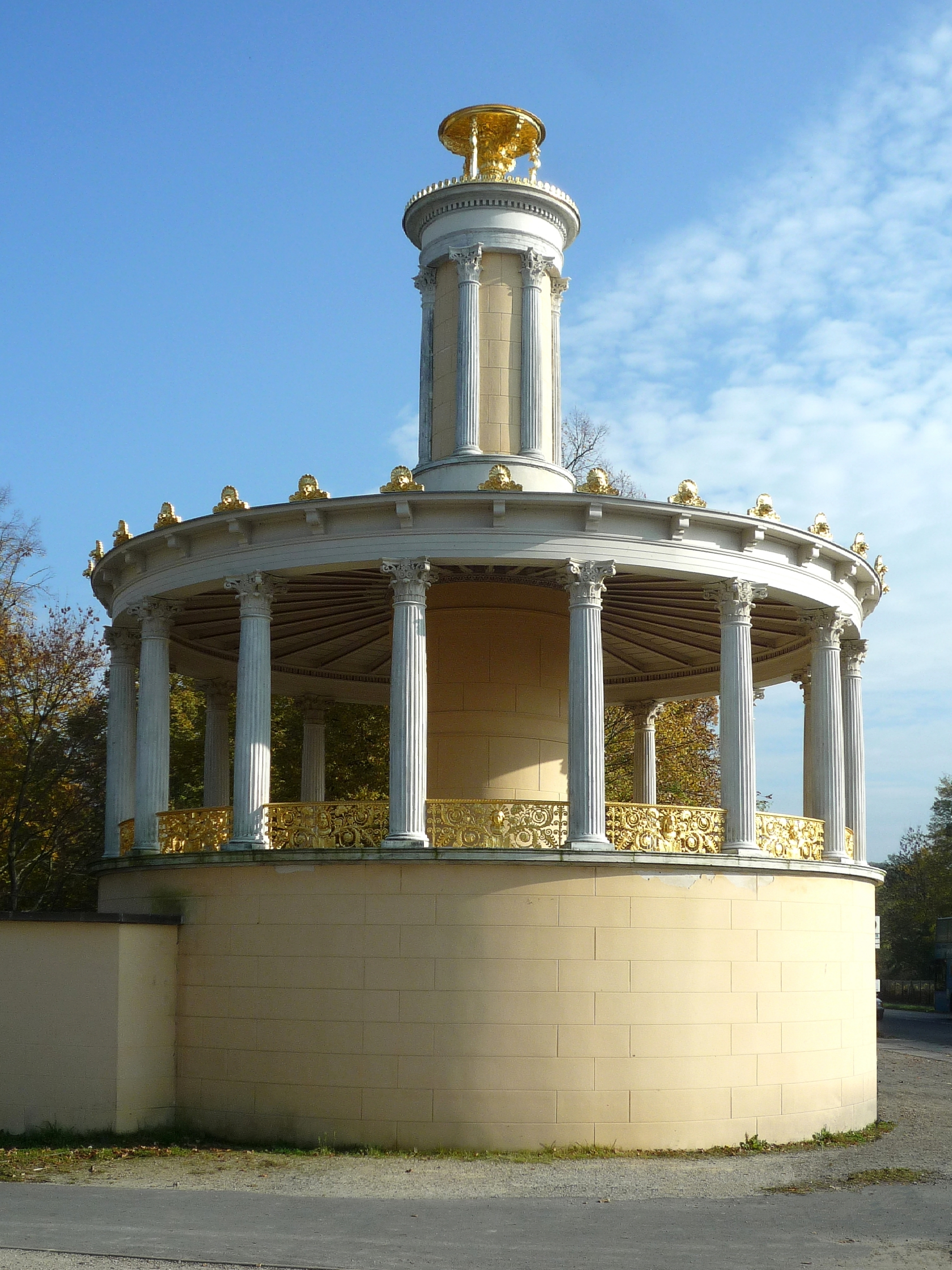
Belvedere in the park of the Glienicke Palace, in Berlin

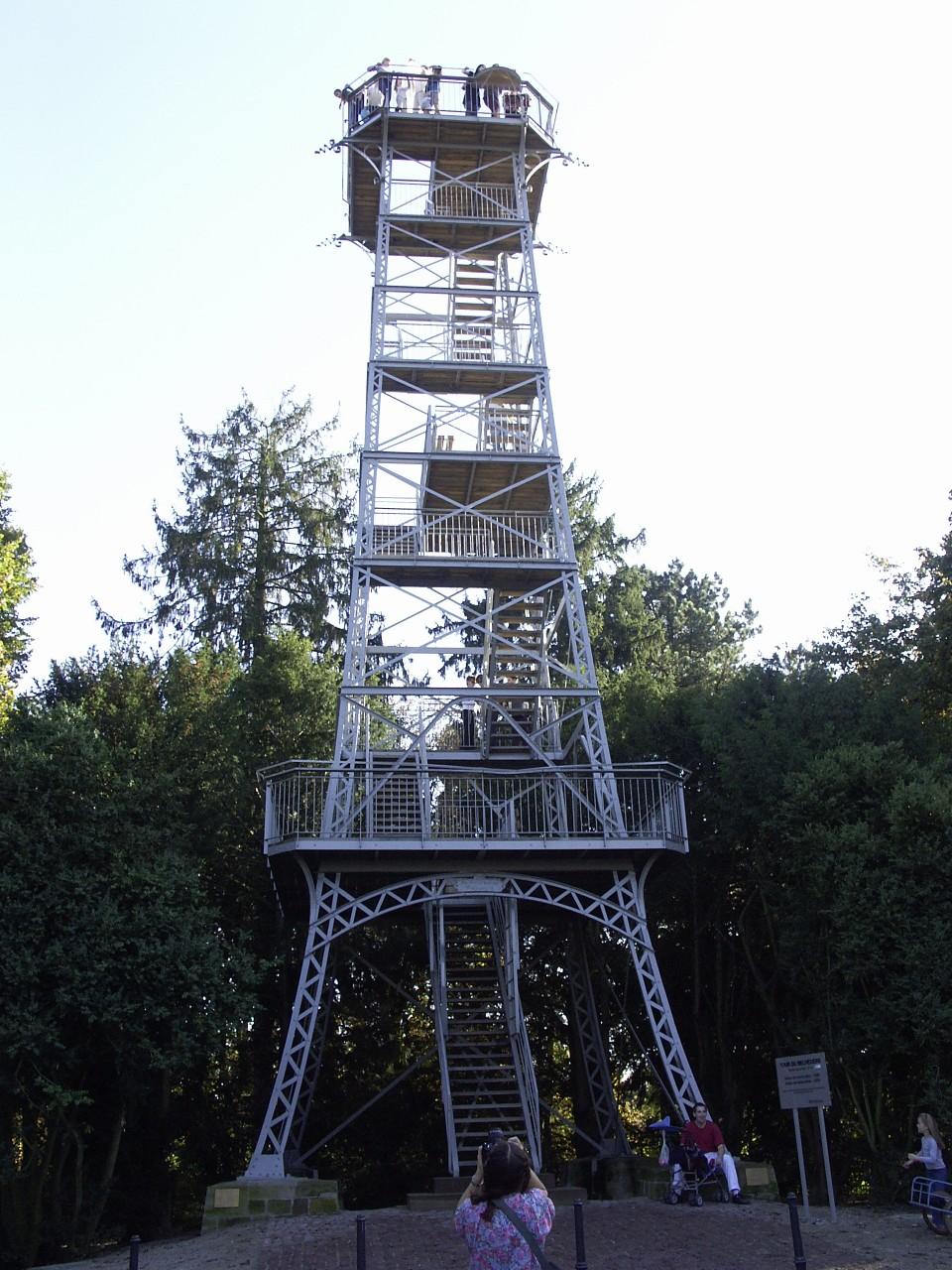
Tour du Belvédère, Mulhouse in Alsace

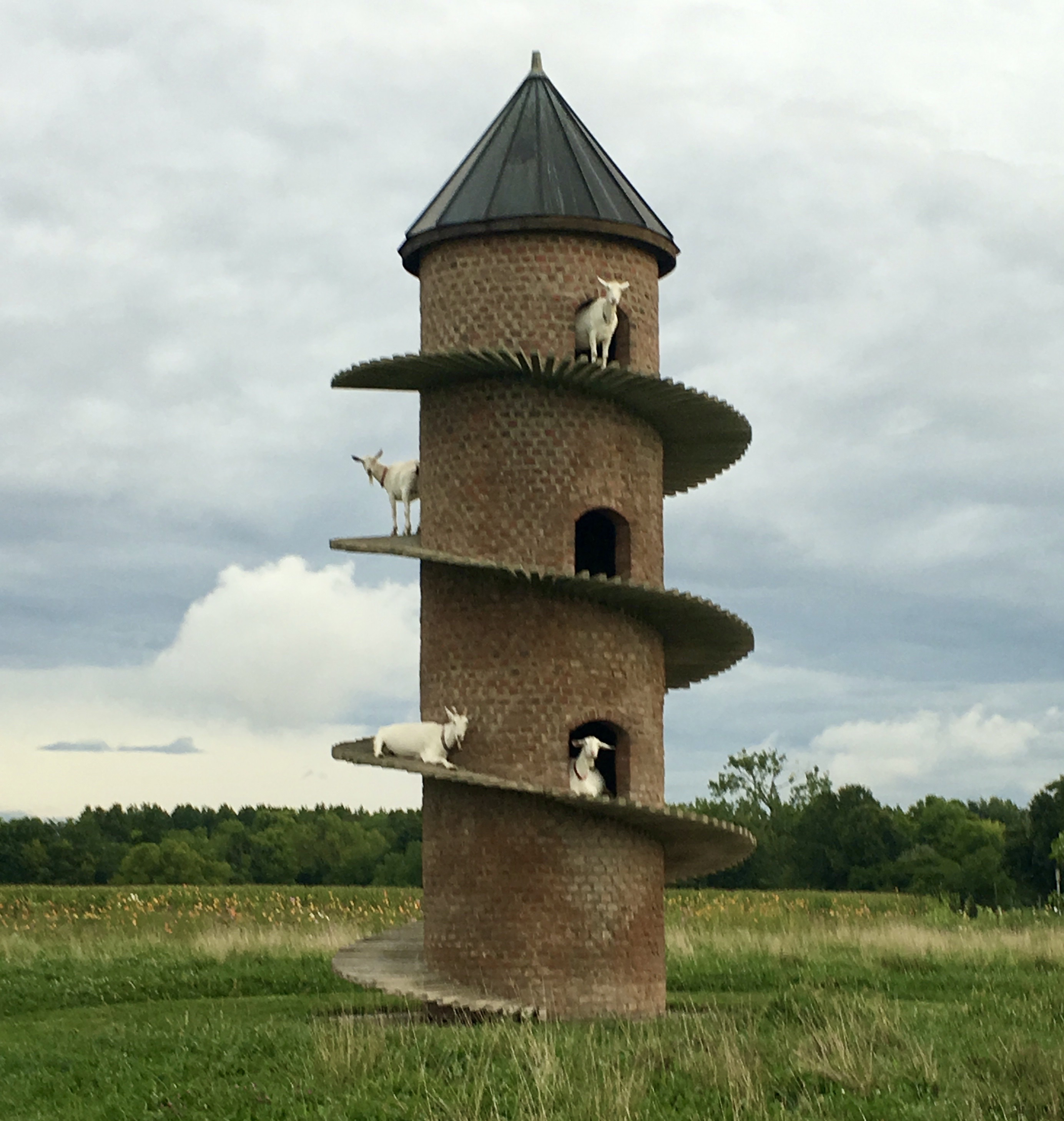
Johnson's Belvedere, "Tower of Baaa" in Findlay, Illinois

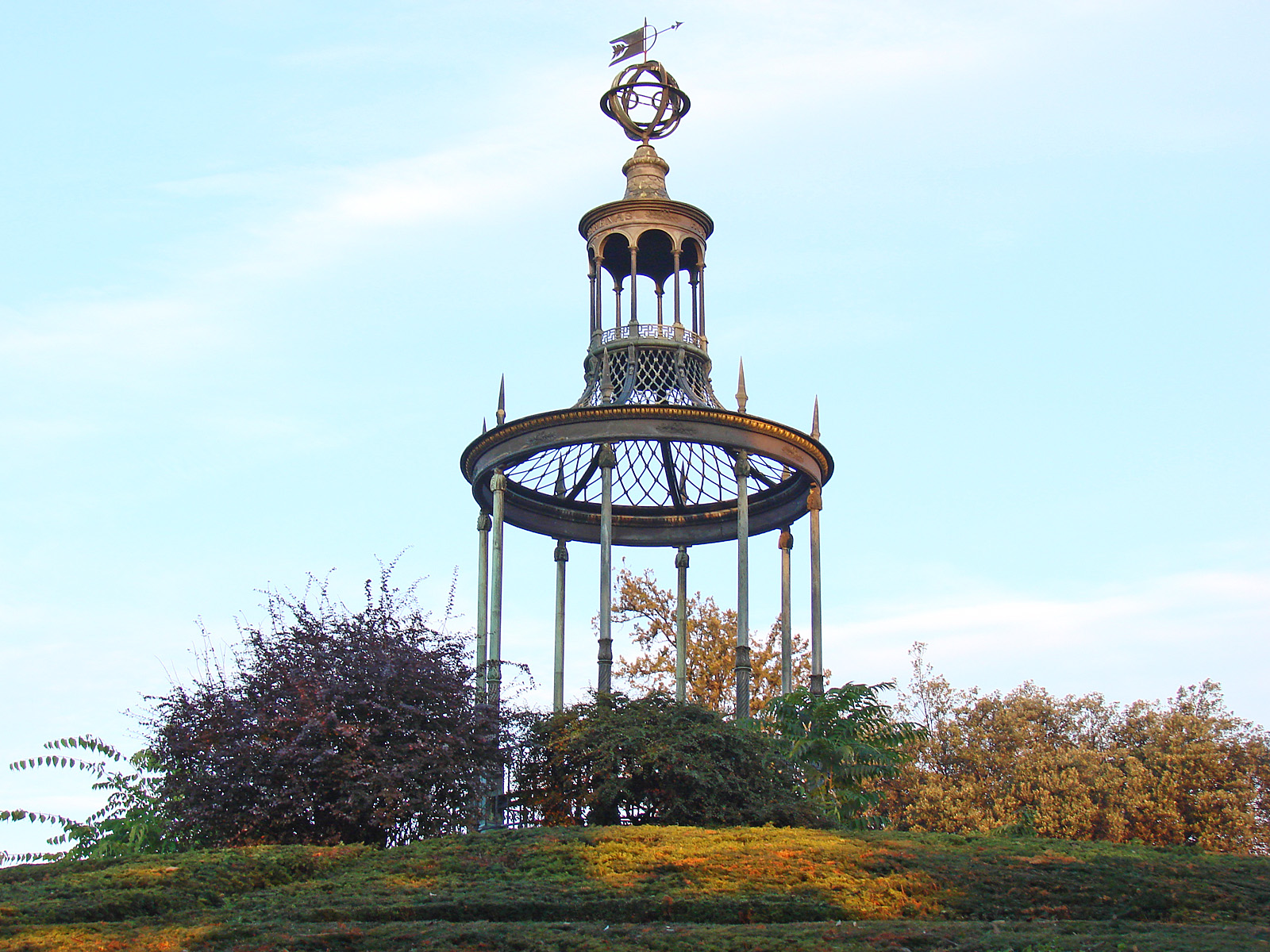
Gloriette de Buffon in the Jardin des plantes in Paris

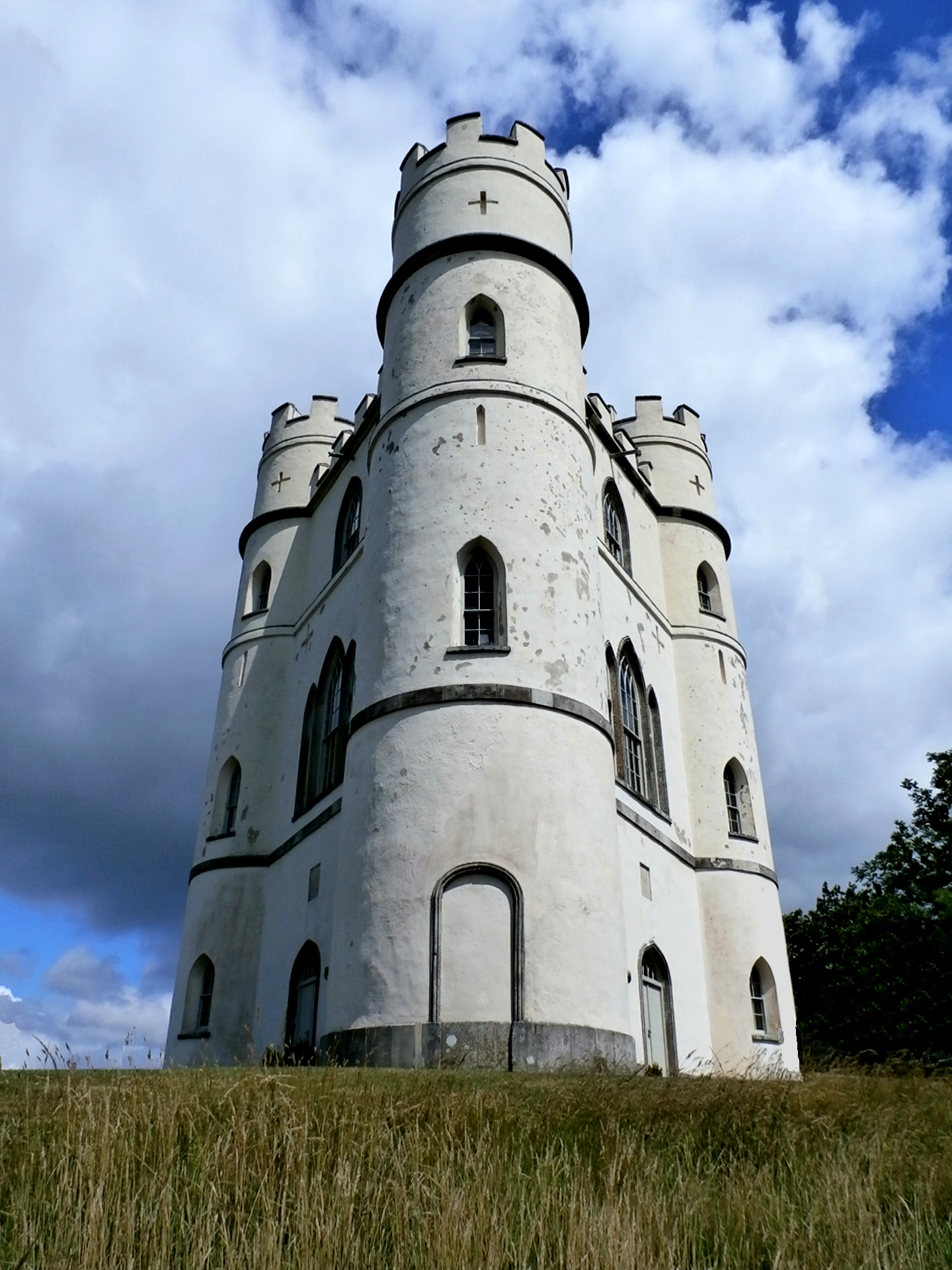
Haldon Belvedere, in Devon, UK

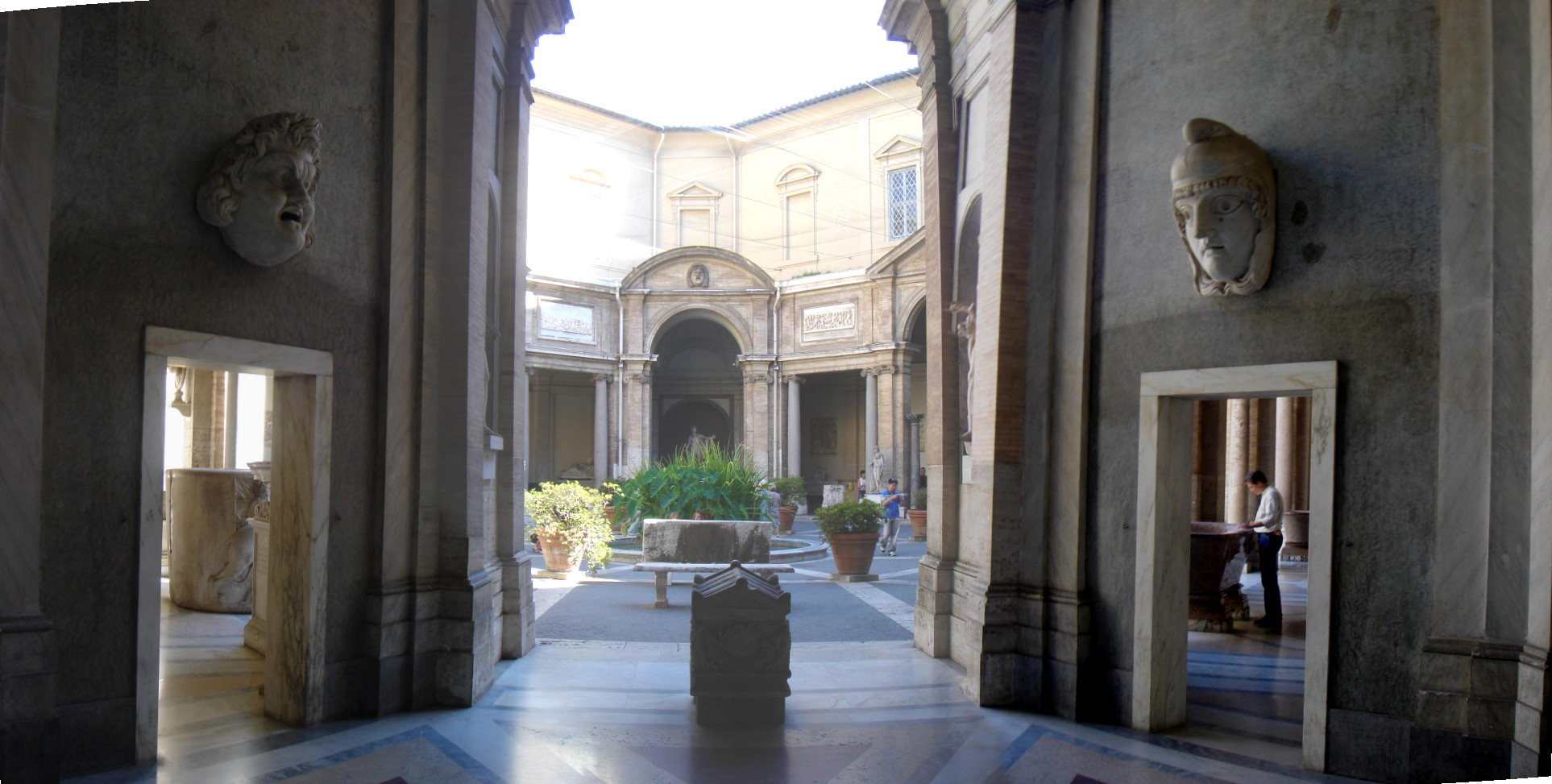
Patio of the Cortile del Belvedere in the Vatican

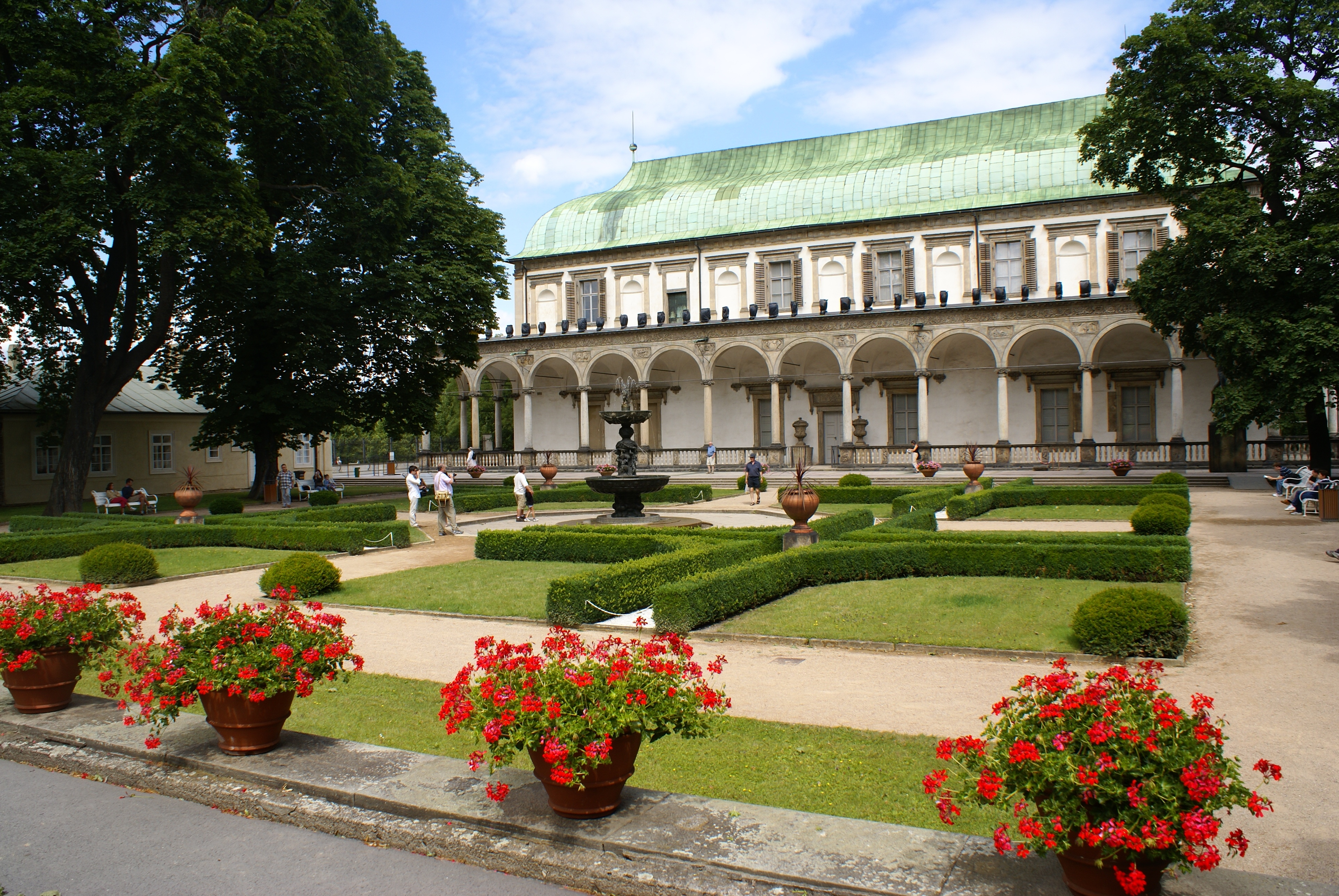
Belvedere of Queen Anne's Summer Palace in the garden of Prague Castle (1538–1560)

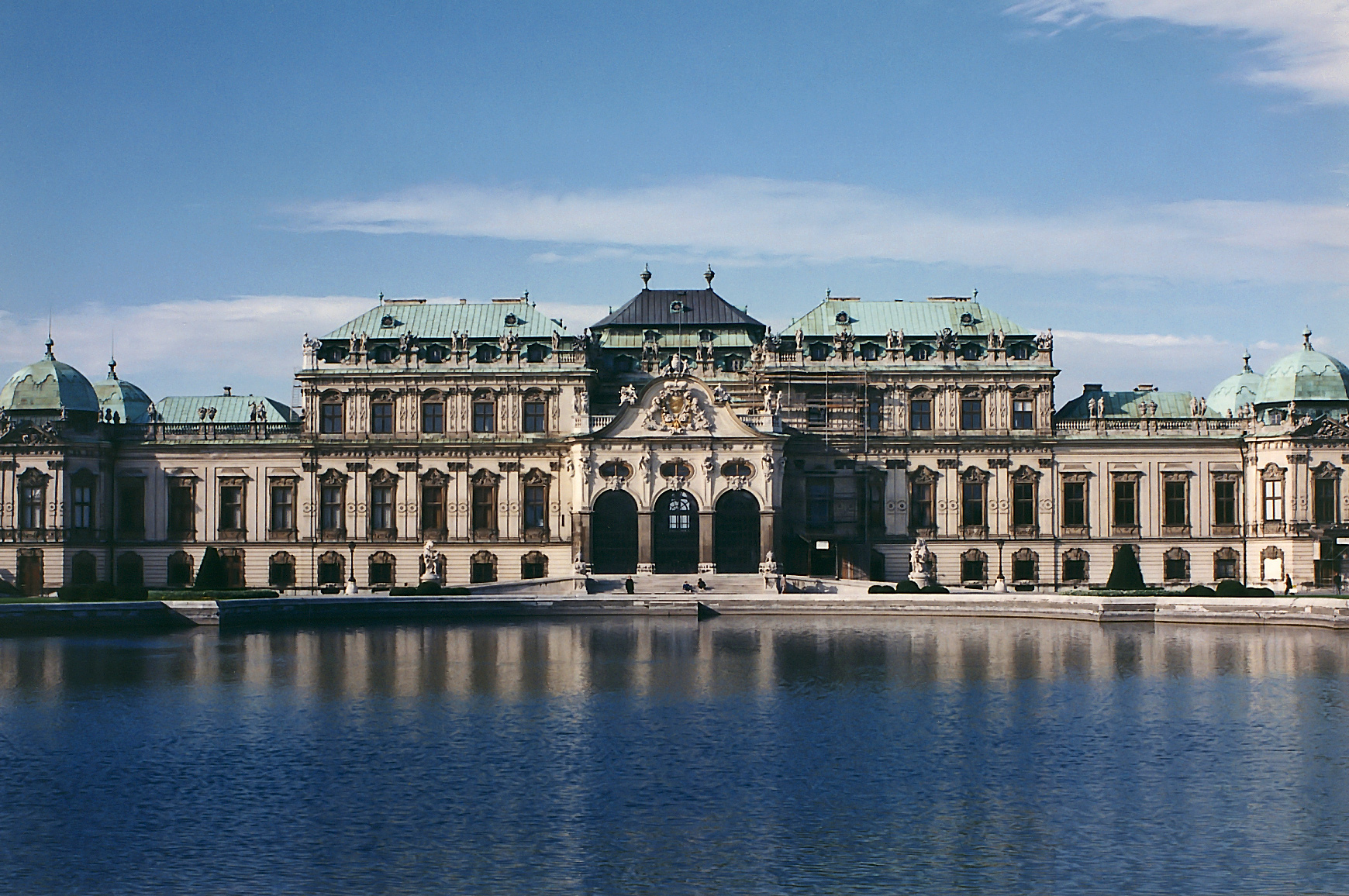
Belvedere, Vienna

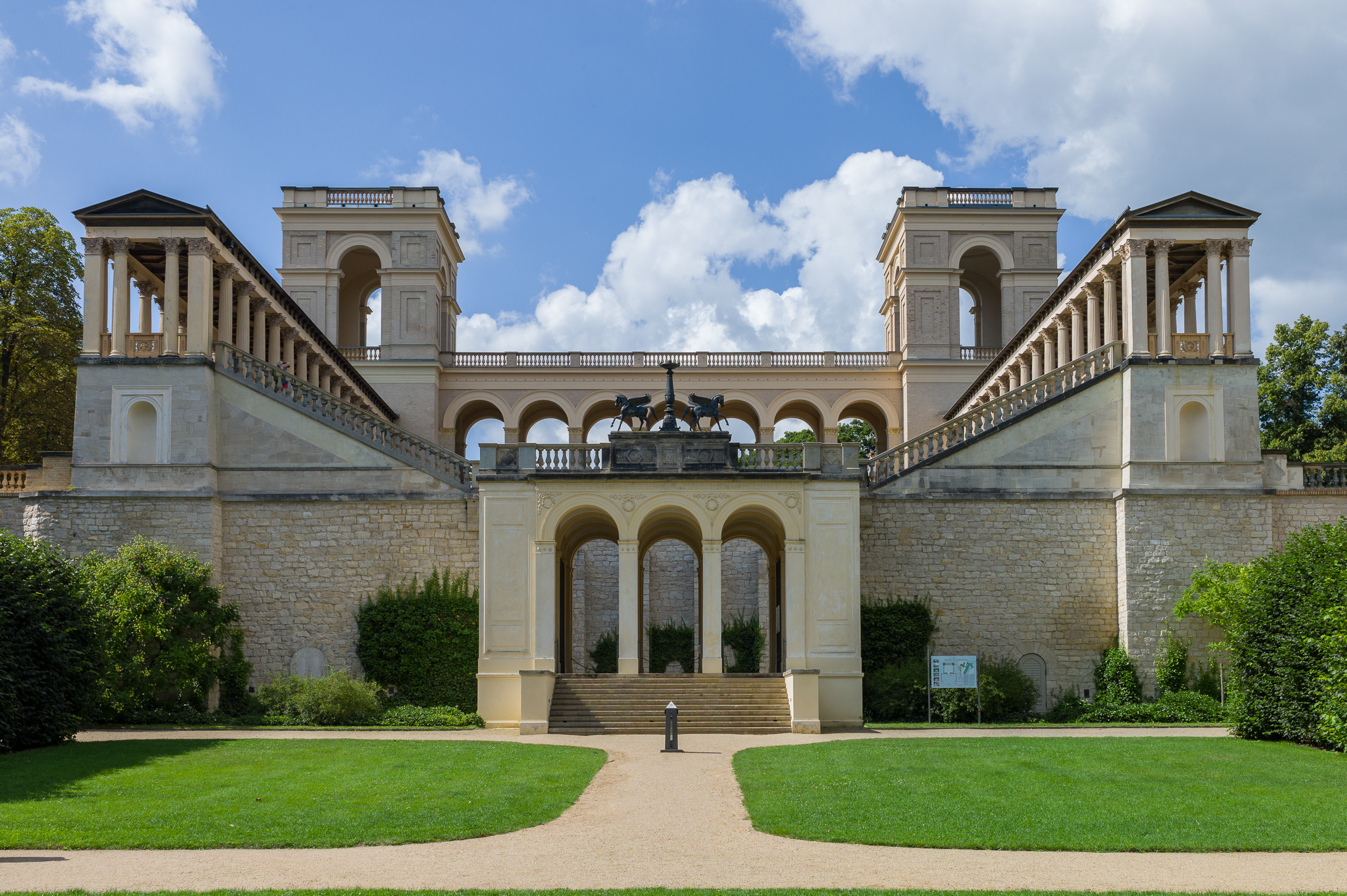
Il Belvedere on the Pfingstberg in Potsdam

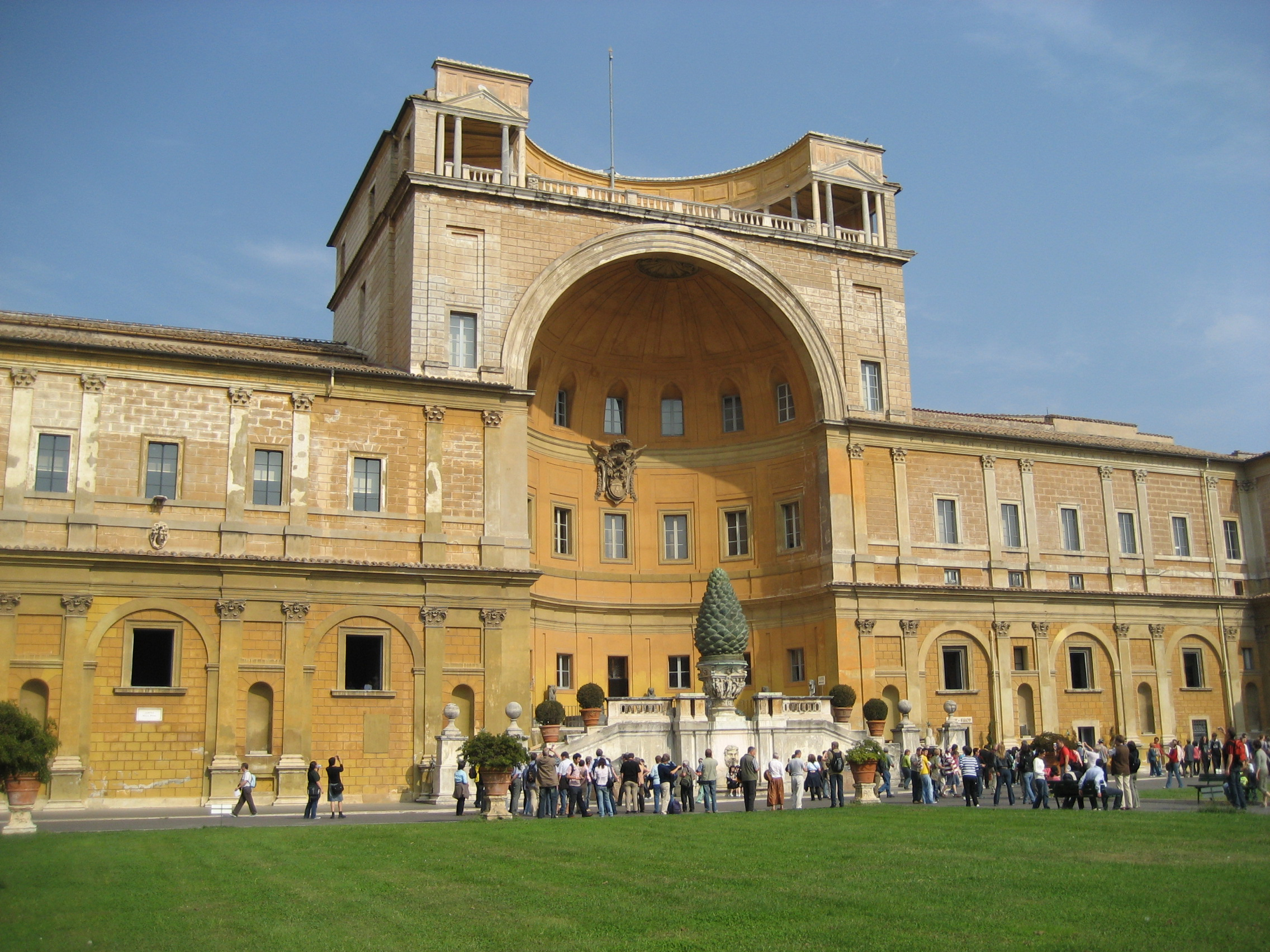
Cortile del Belvedere, Vatican

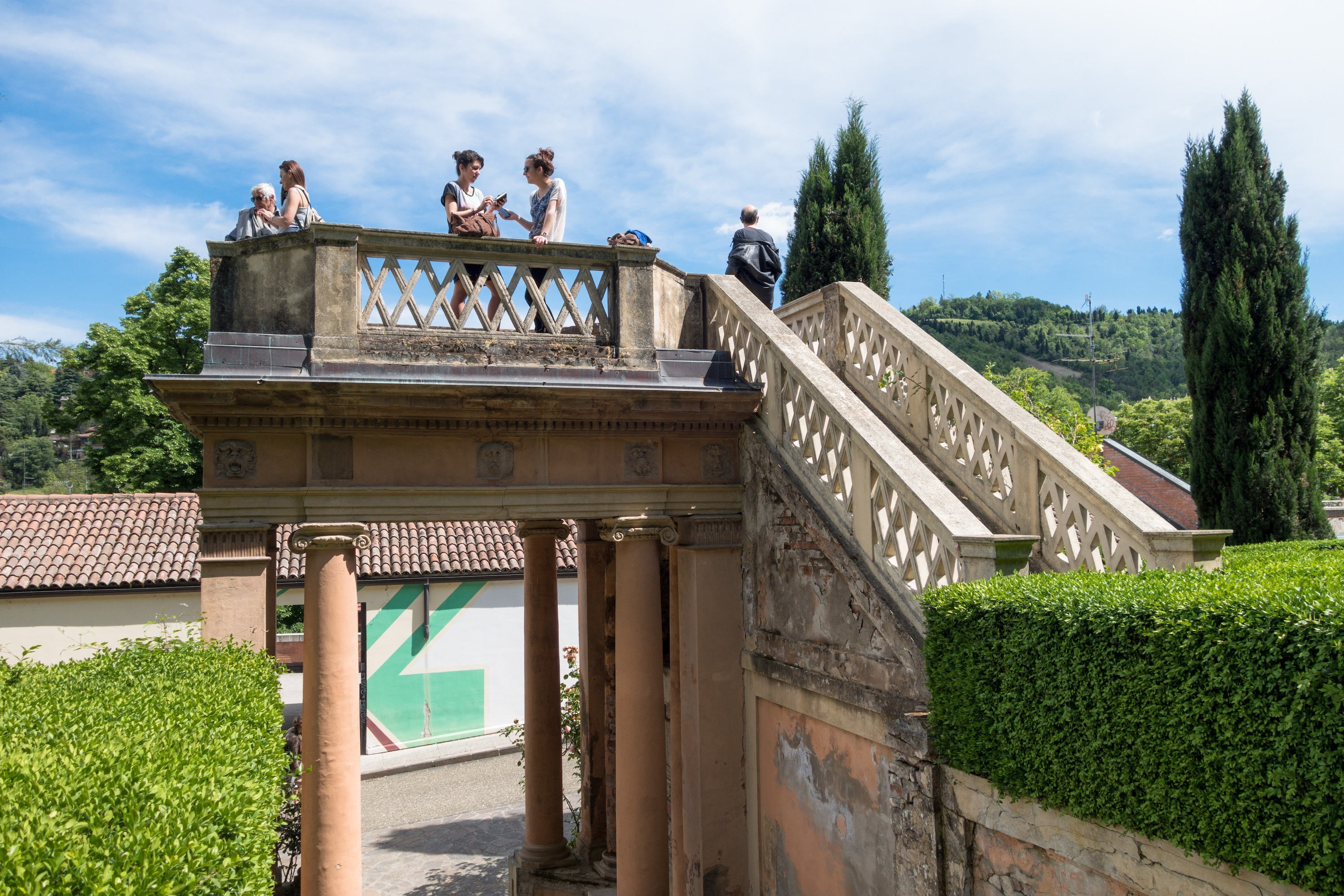
Belevedere of the Villa Spada

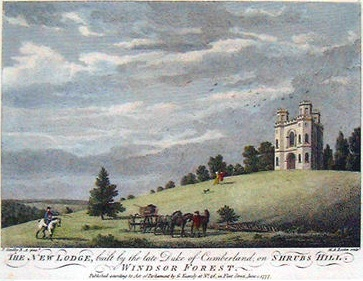
"Shrubs Hill Tower", Windsor
Renamed "Fort Belvedere".

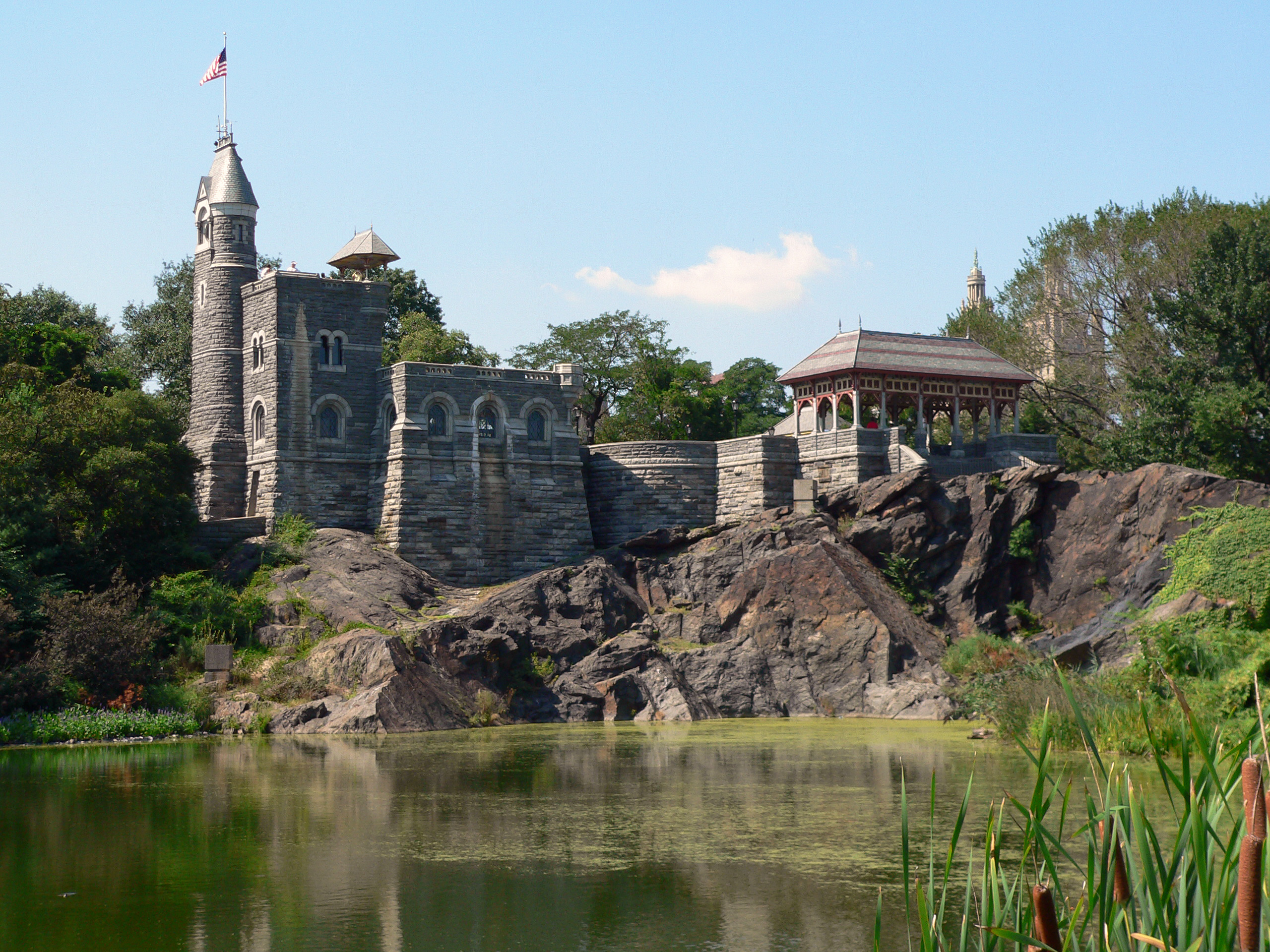
Belvedere Castle, Central Park, New York

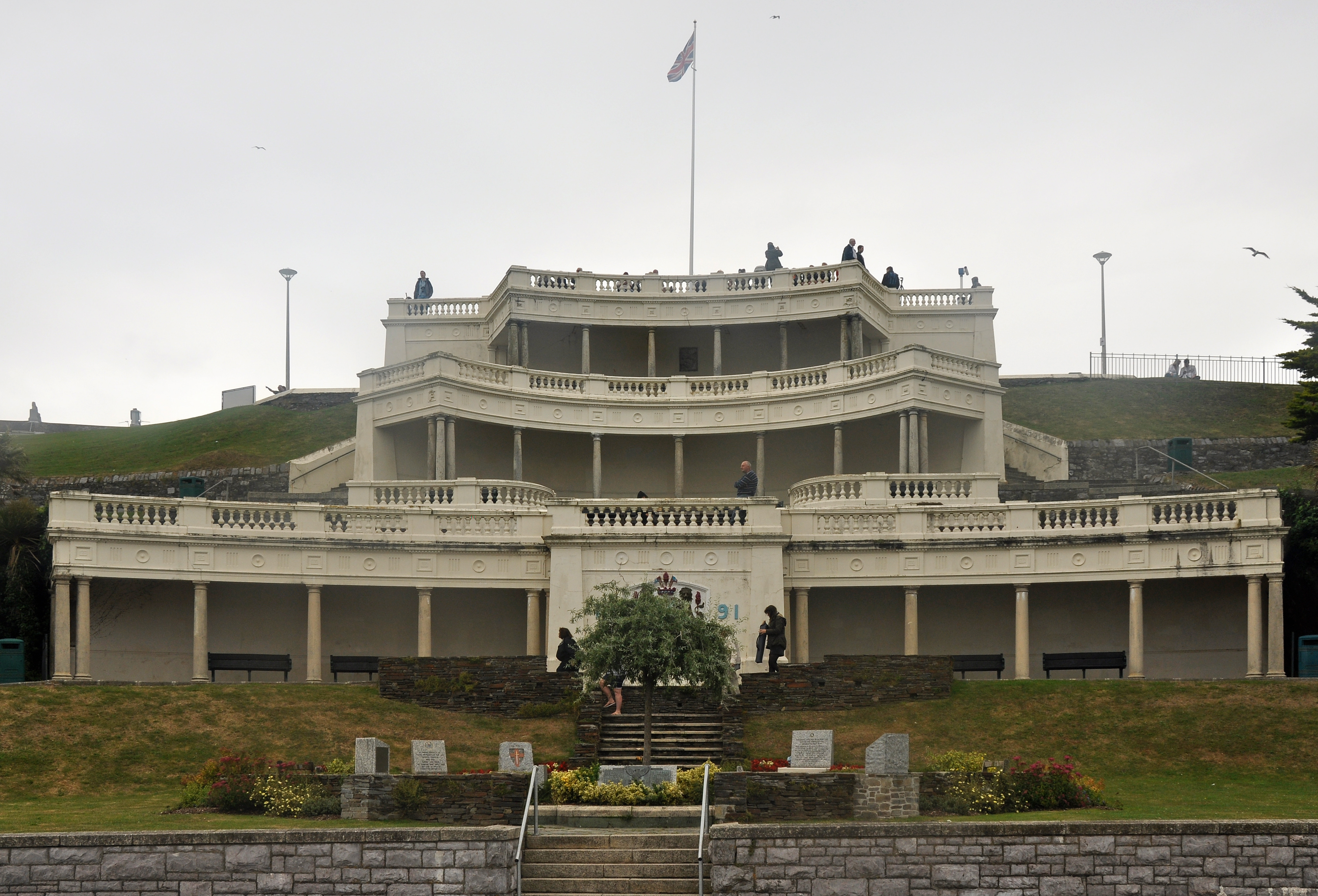
The Belvedere, Plymouth Hoe

== See also ==
- Belvedere (M. C. Escher), a picture by M. C. Escher which shows an impossible belvedere
- Gazebo
- Gloriette
- Widow's walk

== General references ==
- Roth, Leland M. (1993). Understanding Architecture: Its Elements History and Meaning. Oxford, UK: Westview Press. pp. 342–3. ISBN 0-06-430158-3.
