= Tiruchirappalli (disambiguation) =

Tiruchirappalli (formerly Trichinopoly and also known informally as Trichy and Tiruchi) is a city in Tamil Nadu, India.

Tiruchirappalli, Trichnopoly or Tiruchi may also refer to:

- Tiruchirappalli Rock Fort, a rock fort dominating the city
- Tiruchirappalli Fort, another fort in the city
- Tiruchirappalli District, a district of Tamil Nadu, India with the city as its headquarters
- Roman Catholic Diocese of Trichinopoly
- Trichinopoly District, former district in India
- Tiruchirappalli (Lok Sabha constituency)
- Tiruchirappalli – I (State Assembly Constituency)
- Tiruchirappalli West (State Assembly Constituency)
- Tiruchirappalli – II (State Assembly Constituency)
- Tiruchirappalli East (State Assembly Constituency)
- Trichinopoly Group, geological formation in India
- Trichinopoly cigar, a type of Indian cigar (cheroot) from the city
- Trichinopoly Club, erstwhile Europeans-only-club in the city
- Tiruchirappalli International Airport
- Tiruchi N. Siva, Indian politician
- Thiruchirappalli Govindarajulu Lingappa, Indian music director
- Thiruchi Loganathan, Indian musician

== See also ==
- Tiruchirappalli East (disambiguation)
- Tiruchirappalli West (disambiguation)
- Battle of Trichinopoly (disambiguation)
- Siege of Trichinopoly (disambiguation)
