= Siege of Trichinopoly =

Siege of Trichinopoly may refer to:

- Siege of Trichinopoly (1660), part of Madurai–Tanjore conflicts
- Siege of Trichinopoly (1741), the siege and capture of Trichinopoly by the Marathas
- Siege of Trichinopoly (1743), the siege and capture of Trichinopoly by Hyderabad
- Siege of Trichinopoly (1751–52), the siege of Trichinopoly during the Second Carnatic War

== See also ==
- Battle of Trichinopolly (disambiguation)
- Tiruchirappalli (disambiguation)
