= Tiruchirappalli West =

Tiruchirappalli West may refer to these places in Tamil Nadu, India:

- Tiruchirappalli West taluk, a taluk (subdistrict) of Tiruchirappalli district
  - Tiruchirappalli West (state assembly constituency)

== See also ==
- Tiruchirappalli (disambiguation)
