= Stringer Lawrence =

British army officer (1698–1775)

Major-General Stringer Lawrence
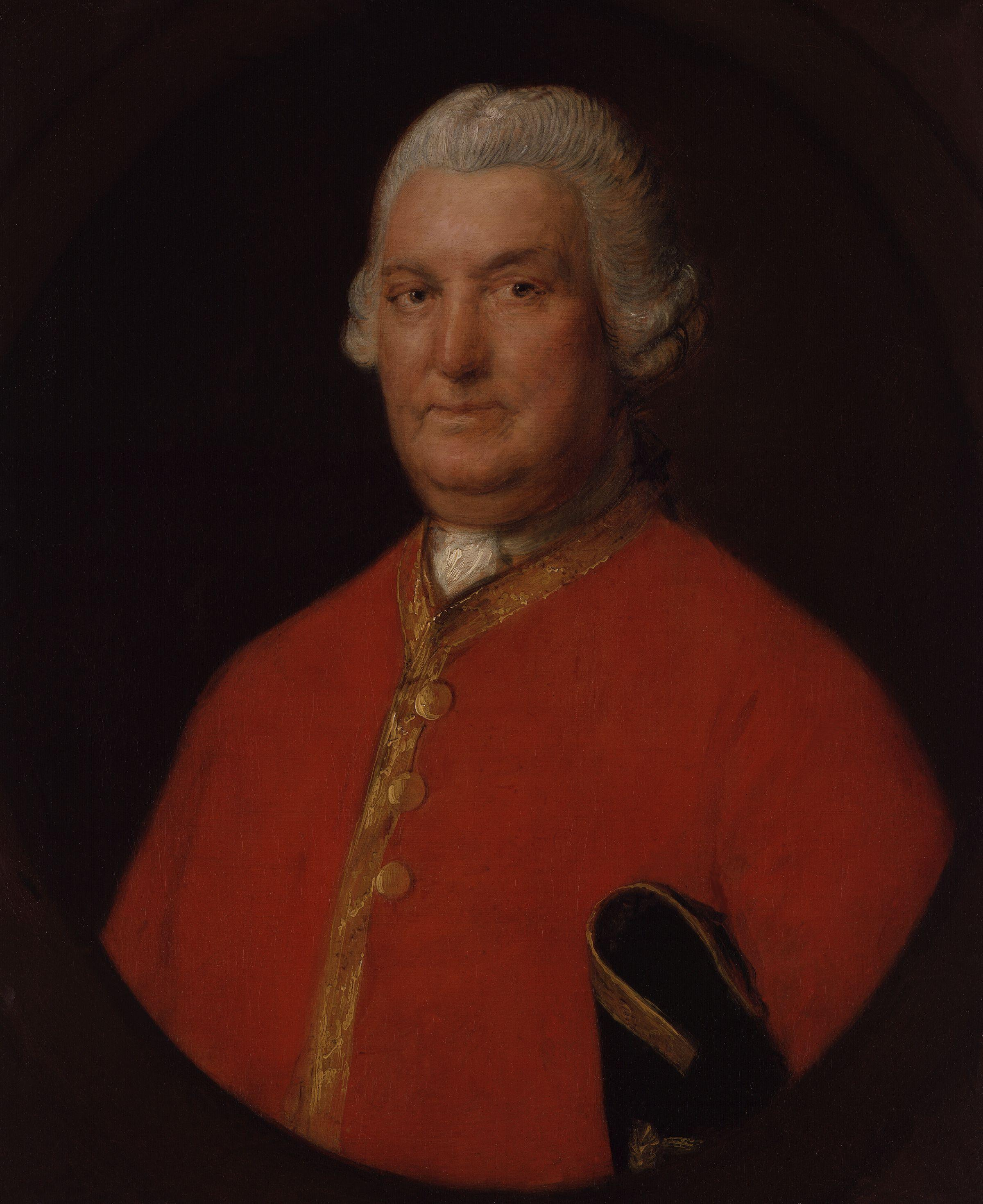
- Portrait by Thomas Gainsborough, c. 1774–1775
- Born: February 1698; Hereford, Herefordshire
- Died: 10 January 1775 (aged 76); London, England
- Military career
- Allegiance: Great Britain; East India Company
- Branch: British Army; Presidency armies
- Service years: c. 1727–1766
- Rank: Major general
- Unit: Jasper Clayton's Regiment of Foot
- Conflicts: War of the Austrian Succession; Jacobite rising of 1745; Battle of Culloden; Carnatic Wars; Battle of Golden Rock

Major-General Stringer Lawrence (February 1698 – 10 January 1775) was a British army officer who served in the War of the Austrian Succession, Jacobite rising of 1745 and Carnatic Wars. Lawrence is best known for his service in British India, where he modernised and formed the Presidency armies of the East India Company into a formidable force which would go on to play a leading role in the British conquest of India, earning Lawrence the nickname of "Father of the Indian Army".

== Origins ==
Lawrence was born at Hereford, England, the son of John Lawrence of Hereford by his wife Mary, about either of whom little is known. He was baptised in the Church of All Saints, Hereford, on 27 February 1697 (Old Style). Concerning his possible ancestry, in 1660 "James Lawrence, junior, gentleman", was admitted to the freedom of the City of Hereford, and became Mayor in 1661. In 1682 "John Lawrence, apothecary", and in 1702 "John Lawrence, brewer", were admitted to the freedom of the city. In the opinion of Biddulph (1901) one of these last "must, almost certainly, have been the father of Stringer Lawrence". In the All Saints' Church burial register is recorded the burial of a certain Michael Stringer on 13 November 1698, from which fact Biddulph (1901) presumed that Stringer was the maiden name of his mother.

== Career ==
Portrait of Lawrence and Muhammad Ali Khan Wallajah

For Discipline Established, Fortresses Protected, Settlements Extended, French and Indian Armies Defeated, and Peace Concluded in the Carnatic

— Epitaph by the East India Company, Westminster Abbey

Lawrence was commissioned as an ensign into Jasper Clayton's Regiment of Foot of the British Army in 1727. He was stationed in Gibraltar and during the War of the Austrian Succession served in Flanders before returning to Britain to take part in the suppression of the Jacobite rising of 1745, taking part in the Battle of Culloden. In 1748, at the rank of major and having the reputation of an experienced soldier, he went out to India to command the East India Company's troops. Joseph François Dupleix's schemes for the French conquest of southern India were on the point of taking effect, and not long after his arrival at Fort St David, Lawrence was actively engaged. He successfully foiled an attempted surprise by French troops at Cuddalore, but was captured by a French cavalry patrol at Ariancopang (modern Ariankuppam) whilst leading forces to assist Admiral Edward Boscawen in enforcing the siege of Pondicherry in 1748. He was kept prisoner by the French until the Treaty of Aix-la-Chapelle.

In 1749 he was in command at the capture of Devicota, during which one of his subordinate officers was Robert Clive (1725–1774), the future Commander-in-Chief of British India, with whom a lifelong friendship began. When Clive had become famous he honoured Lawrence by refusing to accept a sword of honour unless one was voted to him also, as the creator of the Indian army.

In 1750 Lawrence returned to England, but he was back in India by 1752. Here he found Clive in command of a force intended for the relief of Trichinopoly. As senior officer Lawrence took over the command, but was careful to allow Clive every credit for his share in the subsequent operations, which included the relief of Trichinopoly and the surrender of the entire French besieging force. In 1752 with an inferior force he defeated the French at Bahour and in 1753 again relieved Trichinopoly. For the next seventeen months he fought a series of actions in defence of that place, and finally arranged an armistice of three months, afterwards converted into a conditional treaty. He was commander-in-chief until the arrival of the first detachment of regular forces of the crown.

In 1757 he served in the operations against Wandiwash, and in 1758-1759 was in command of Fort St George, Madras, during the siege by the French under Lally. In 1759 failing health compelled him to return to England, but in 1761 he resumed his command as major-general and commander-in-chief. Clive supplemented his old friend's limited income by settling on him an annuity of £500 a year. In 1765 he presided over the board charged with arranging the reorganisation of the Madras army, and he finally retired the following year.

== Retirement, death and succession ==
His retirement years in England were spent as an honoured guest of his friend Sir Robert Palk, 1st Baronet (1717-1798) at Haldon House in the parish of Dunchideock in Devon, a fellow officer of the British East India Company who served as Governor of the Madras Presidency.

He died in London on 10 January 1775, and was buried in Dunchideock Church in Devon, the parish church of Haldon House.

Lawrence bequeathed the huge sum of £50,000 to his friend Palk, as whose guest Lawrence spent his retirement. Palk erected lavish monuments in Lawrence's memory, namely the 26 metres (85 ft) high triangular 'Lawrence Tower' (at Haldon House), containing a life-size statue of Lawrence dressed as a Roman general and decorated with three large tablets inscribed with details of his career, and also a mural monument in Dunchideock Church. Palk named his son and heir Lawrence in his honour, which became a tradition in the Palk family.

== Armorials ==
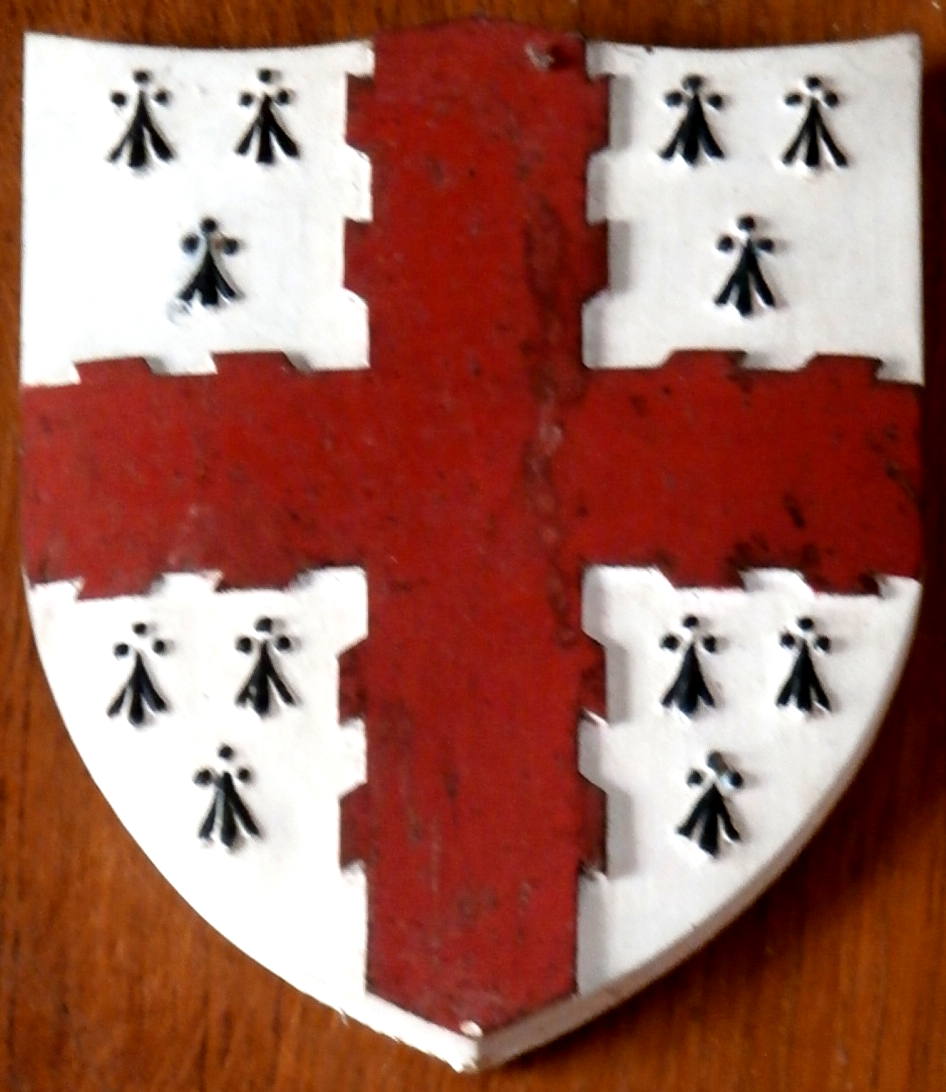
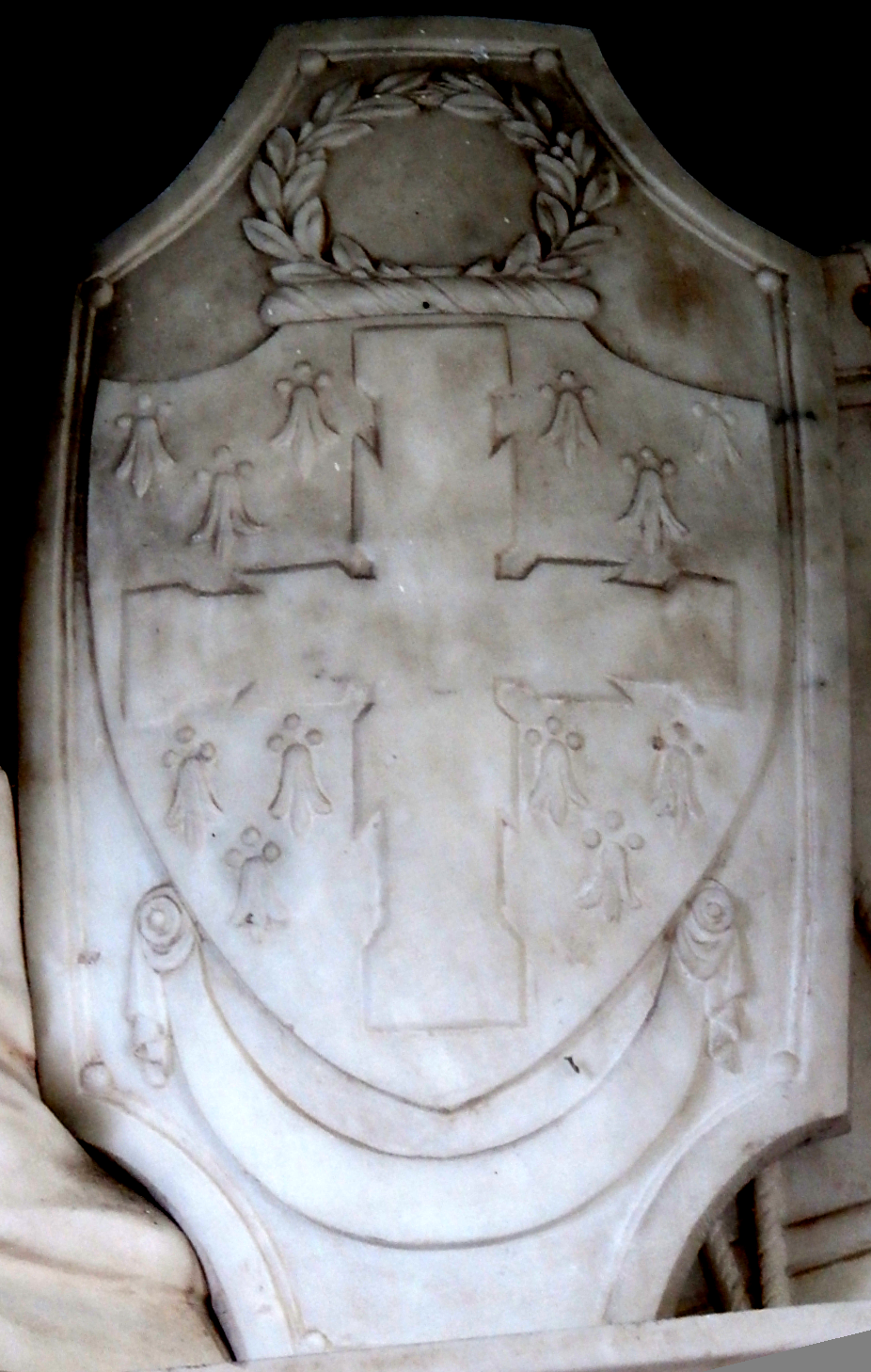
Arms of General Stringer Lawrence: Ermine, a cross raguly gules; left: painted on vestry screen, right: with crest of a victor's laurel crown, detail from his mural monument, both in Dunchideock Church

His arms were: Ermine, a cross raguly gules, as is visible without tinctures on his monuments in Westminster Abbey and Dunchideock, and with tinctures on the vestry screen of Dunchideock Church. These are the arms of Sir John Lawrence (d.1692) Lord Mayor of London in 1665, which in 1839 were visible on the monument to Sir Thomas Gresham in St Helen's Church, Bishopsgate, City of London, apparently a difference of the ancient arms of Lawrence of Ashton Hall, Lancashire. They also feature in the arms of John Lawrence, 1st Baron Lawrence (1811-1879), Viceroy of India.

== Monuments ==
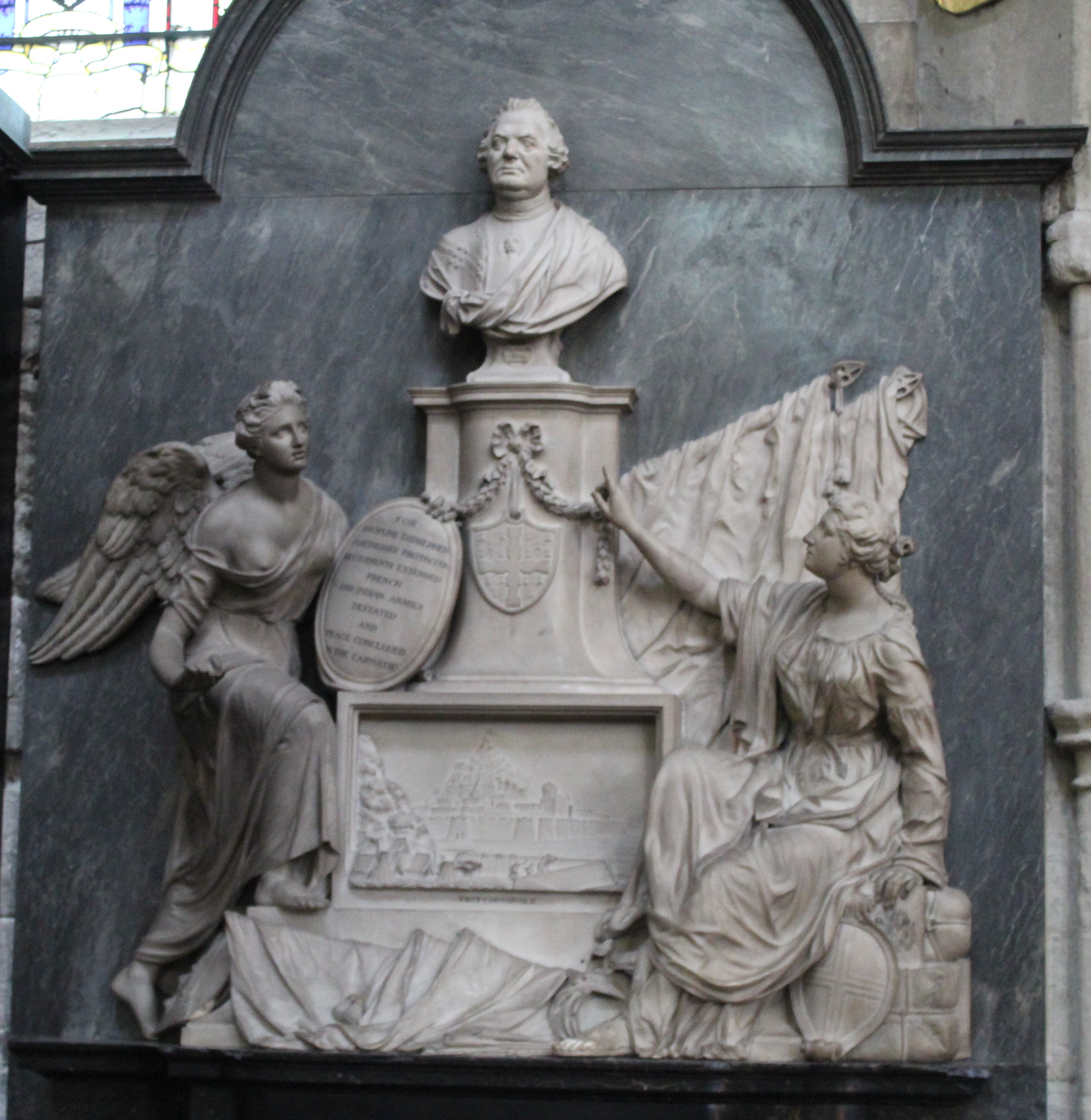
Stringer Lawrence monument, Westminster Abbey

=== Westminster Abbey ===
The East India Company erected a monument to Stringer in white and coloured marble by the sculptor William Tyler (1728-1801), situated in the north aisle of the nave of Westminster Abbey. His bust stands on a pedestal at the top, below which is a medal inscribed "Born March 6, 1697; died January 10, 1775". On the left side below is a winged figure of Fame holding an oval shield inscribed: "For Discipline Established, Fortresses Protected, Settlements Extended, French and Indian Armies Defeated, and Peace Concluded in the Carnatic". On the right side below is a female figure seated on a bale, representing the East India Company. She points towards Lawrence's bust and at her feet are shown various French and Indian flags. An heraldic escutcheon on the front of the pedestal shows the arms of Lawrence: Ermine, a cross raguly gules. Also on the pedestal is a panel containing a relief sculpted perspective of a city and an encampment, inscribed: "Tritchinopoly", which town Lawrence defended against the French from May 1753 to October 1754. The main inscription on the black marble base is as follows:

"Erected by the East India Company to the memory of Major General Stringer Lawrence in testimony of their gratitude for his eminent services in the command of their forces on the coast of Coromandel from the year MDCCXLVI to the year MDCCLXVI".

=== Foreign and Commonwealth Office ===
A life-size marble statue of him sculpted in 1764 by Peter Scheemakers (1691-1781) stands in the Foreign and Commonwealth Office in London. The statue is 5 ft 8 inches (172 cm) high and shows him dressed as a Roman general. It was commissioned by the East India Company in 1760 and is inscribed on the front: "Major General Stringer Lawrence. A.D. 1764" and on the side: "P. Scheemakers Ft". A drawing of the statue was published in Neill, J.G.S., Historical Record of the First Madras European Regiment, London, 1843, p. 205.

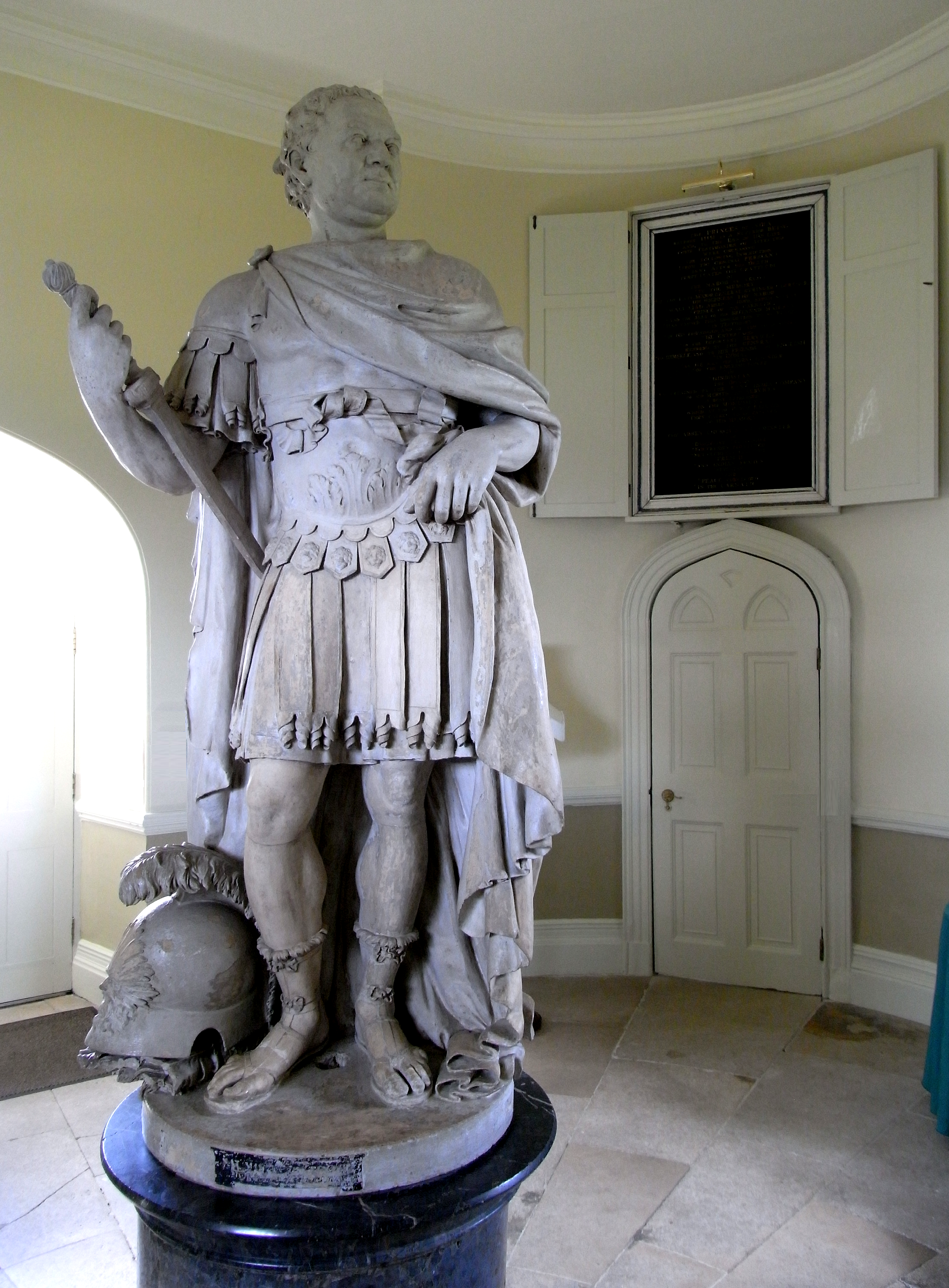
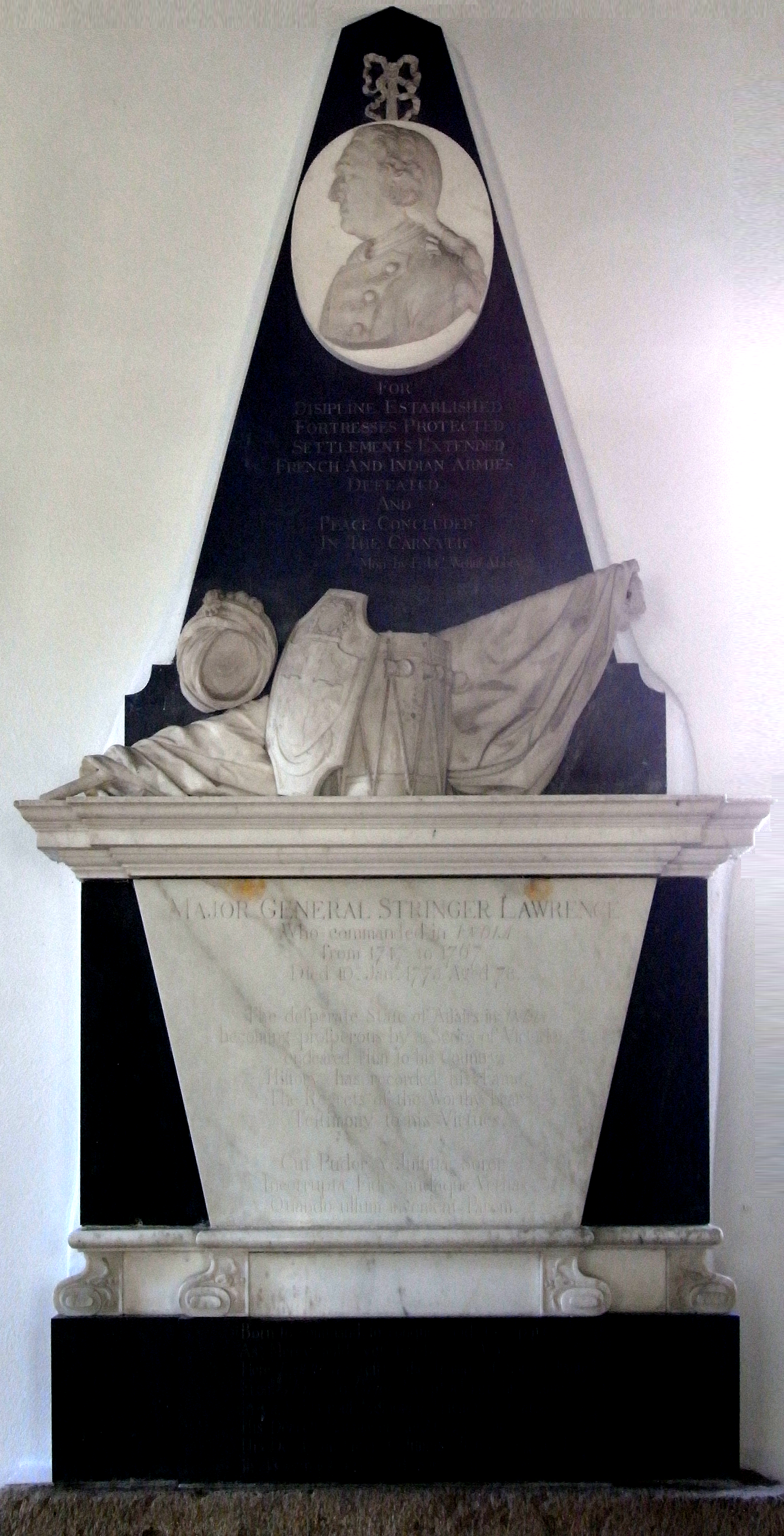
Left: statue of Lawrence dressed as a Roman general, in the Lawrence Tower. On the wall behind is one of the three large tablets inscribed with details of his career. Right: his monument in Dunchideock church.

=== In Devon ===
The 26-metre-high (85 ft) triangular Lawrence Tower, now known as the Haldon Belvedere, was erected in 1788 to Lawrence's memory by Sir Robert Palk of Haldon House, where Lawrence had spent his retirement as a guest.

In the centre of the tower's ground floor stands a statue made of Coade stone similar to the one in the Foreign and Commonwealth Office, and on the walls are three large inscribed tablets recounting Lawrence's career. (Note: Illustrations of these tablets and transcriptions of the text can be seen on Wikimedia Commons: tablet 1, tablet 2, and tablet 3) There is also a reproduction of the Thomas Gainsborough portrait in the National Portrait Gallery in London.

Lawrence was buried in St Michael's Church, Dunchideock, the parish church of Haldon House, where Palk erected a mural monument to him. Like the larger monument in Westminster Abbey, this was also by William Tyler. It contains a marble profile (see photograph in the gallery below) and three inscriptions. (Note: Further details of the monument, including transcripts of the inscriptions, can be seen on the photograph's page on Wikimedia Commons)

== Gallery ==
Likenesses of Stringer Lawrence
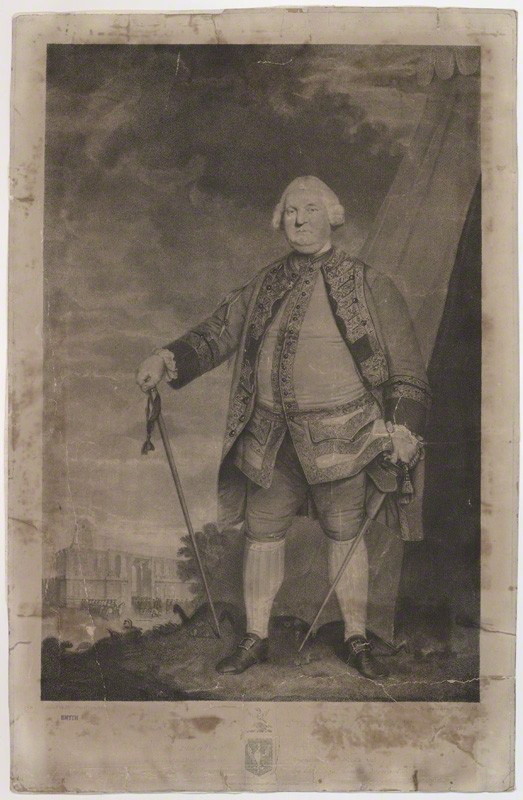
1795 engraving of a portrait by Sir Joshua Reynolds (1723-1792), the original of which hung in Haldon House in 1832 now at location unknown. National Portrait Gallery, London

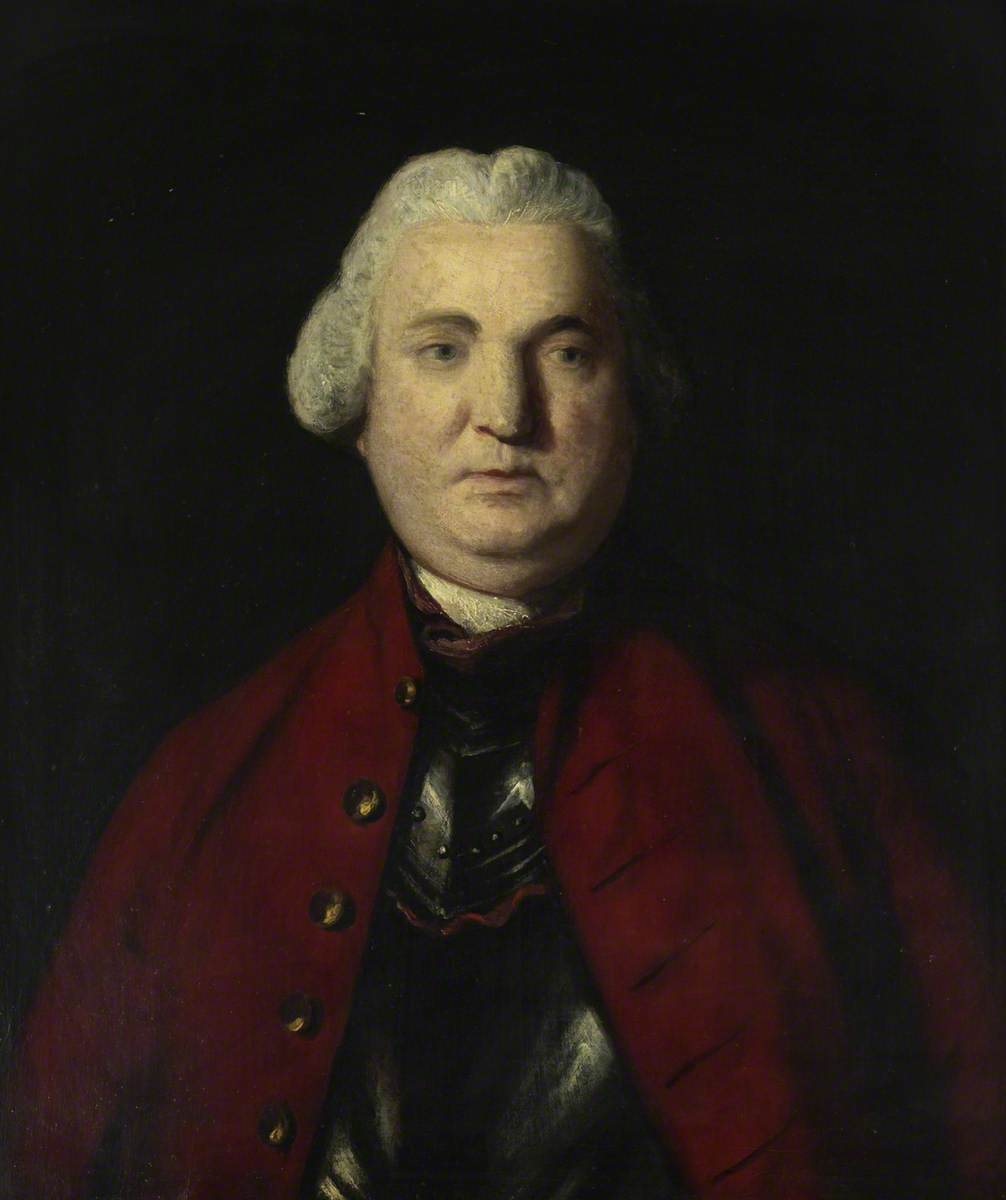
1761 portrait by Sir Joshua Reynolds commissioned by the East India Company in 1760, formerly hung in the India Office in London, now in the British Library, London

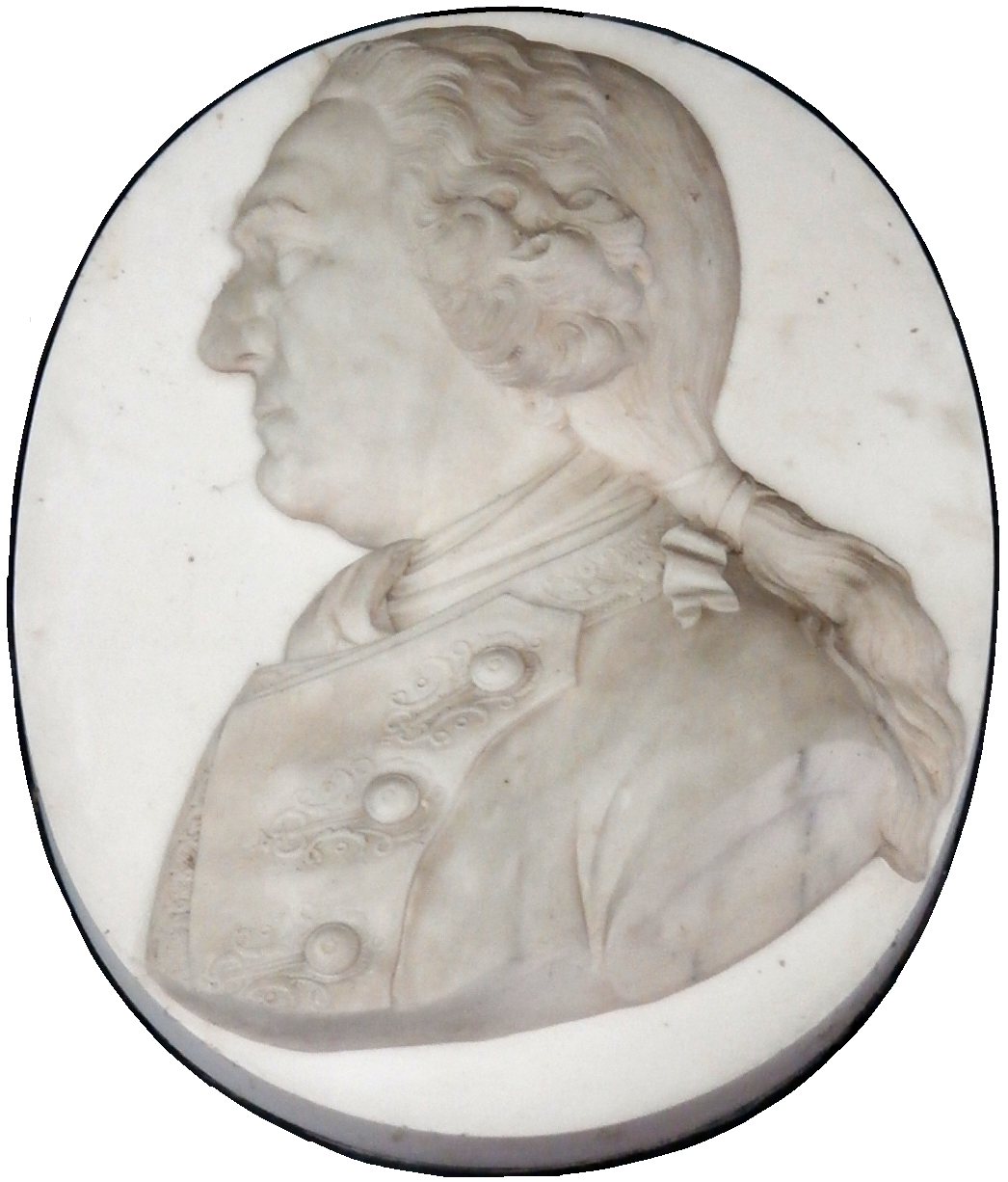
Marble relief sculpture of profile bust by William Tyler, detail from his mural monument in Dunchideock Church

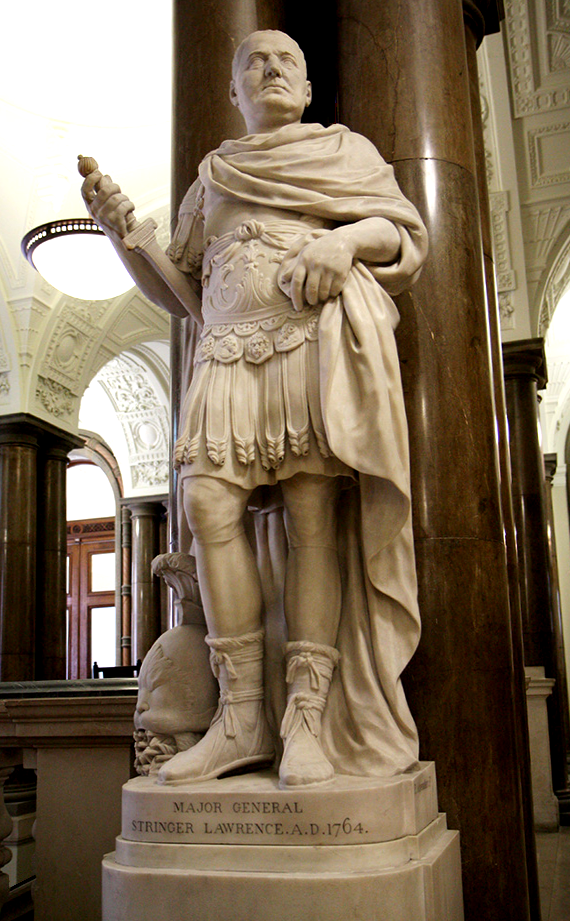
1764 statue of Stringer Lawrence by Peter Scheemakers (1691-1781), Foreign and Commonwealth Office, London

== Notes ==
Military offices
Preceded by New	Commander-in-Chief, India; 1748–1754	Succeeded by John Adlercron
