= Tiruchirappalli East =

Tiruchirappalli East may refer to these places in Tamil Nadu, India:

- Tiruchirappalli East taluk, a taluk (subdistrict) of Tiruchirappalli district
  - Tiruchirappalli East (state assembly constituency)

== See also ==
- Tiruchirappalli (disambiguation)
