= Battle of Golden Rock =

1753 battle

- Part of Second Carnatic War
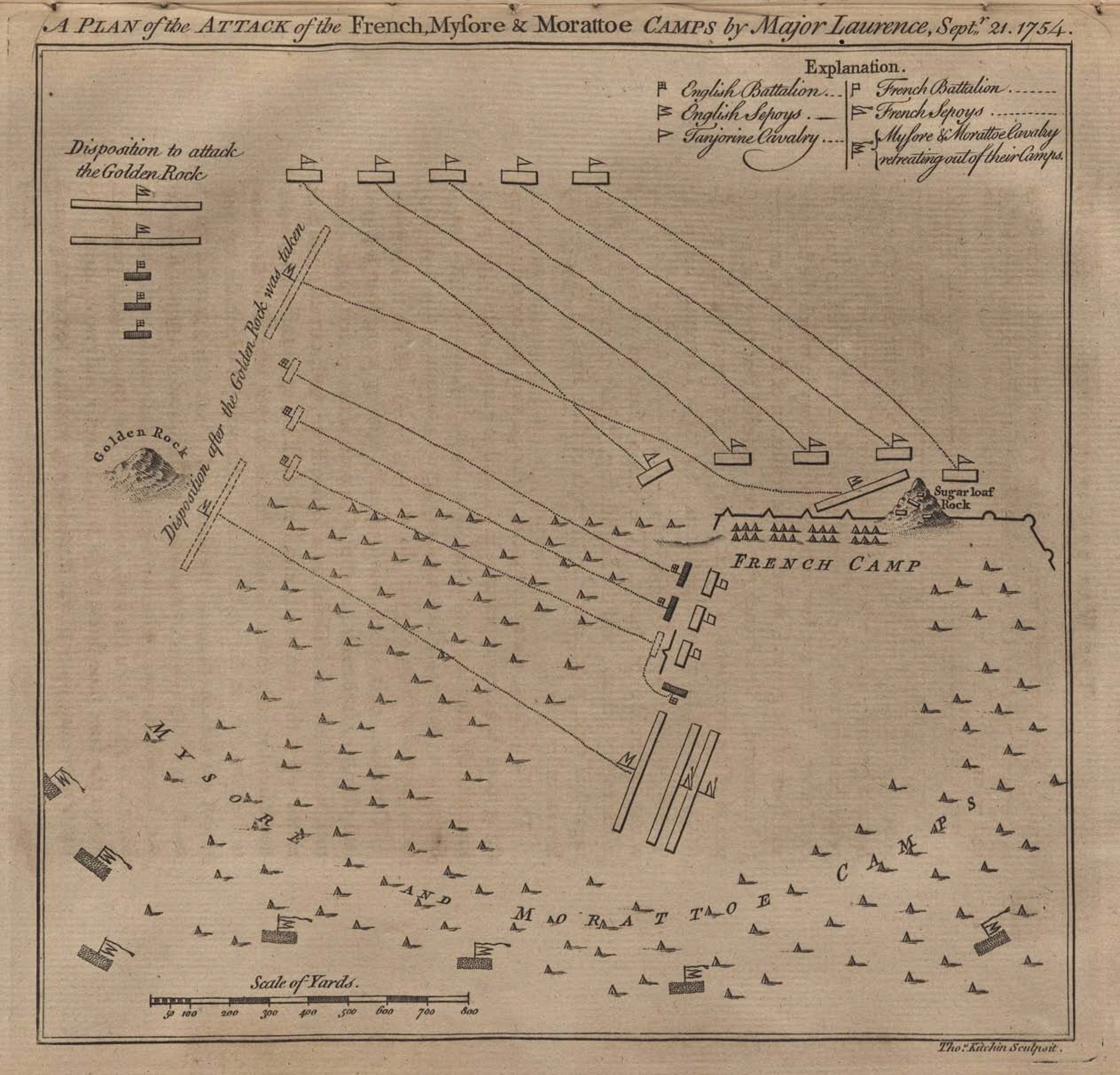
- British Attack Plan of The Battle of Golden Rock
Date	26 June 1753
Location	Trichinopoly
Result	British victory

Belligerents
Great Britain: British East India Company; Arcot State	France: French East India Company; Kingdom of Mysore; Maratha Empire

Commanders and leaders
Stringer Lawrence; Muhammad Ali Khan Wallajah	Monsieur Astruc (French); Nandiraj, Dalavayi of Mysore; Ballappa (Maratha); †

Strength
Major Lawrence; 300 Europeans; 1,300 Sepoys; 8 6-pounder cannons; Nawab of Arcot's 100 horse	Monsieur Astruc; 450 Europeans; 1,500 Sepoys; Artillery; Nandiraj; 8,000 Mysore Cavalry; 2 companies of Topasses (1,000 sepoys); 15,000 irregular infantry armed with matchlocks, swords, bow & arrows, pikes, clubs and rockets.; Ballappa; 3,500 Maratha Cavalry

Casualties and losses
200 sepoys	3 cannons lost 600 cavalry dead

The Battle of Golden Rock was fought between forces of the British and French East India Companies on 26 June 1753, during the Second Carnatic War. French troops, assisted by Mysorean troops led by Monsieur Astruc, assaulted a British outpost near Trichinopoly, drawing the main British force defending Trichinopoly. The British, commanded by Stringer Lawrence, were victorious.
