= Muhammad Ali Khan Wallajah =

Nawab of the Carnatic from 1749 to 1795

- Nawab of the Carnatic; Amir ul-Hind; Walla Jah; Umdat ul-Mulk; Asaf ud-Daula
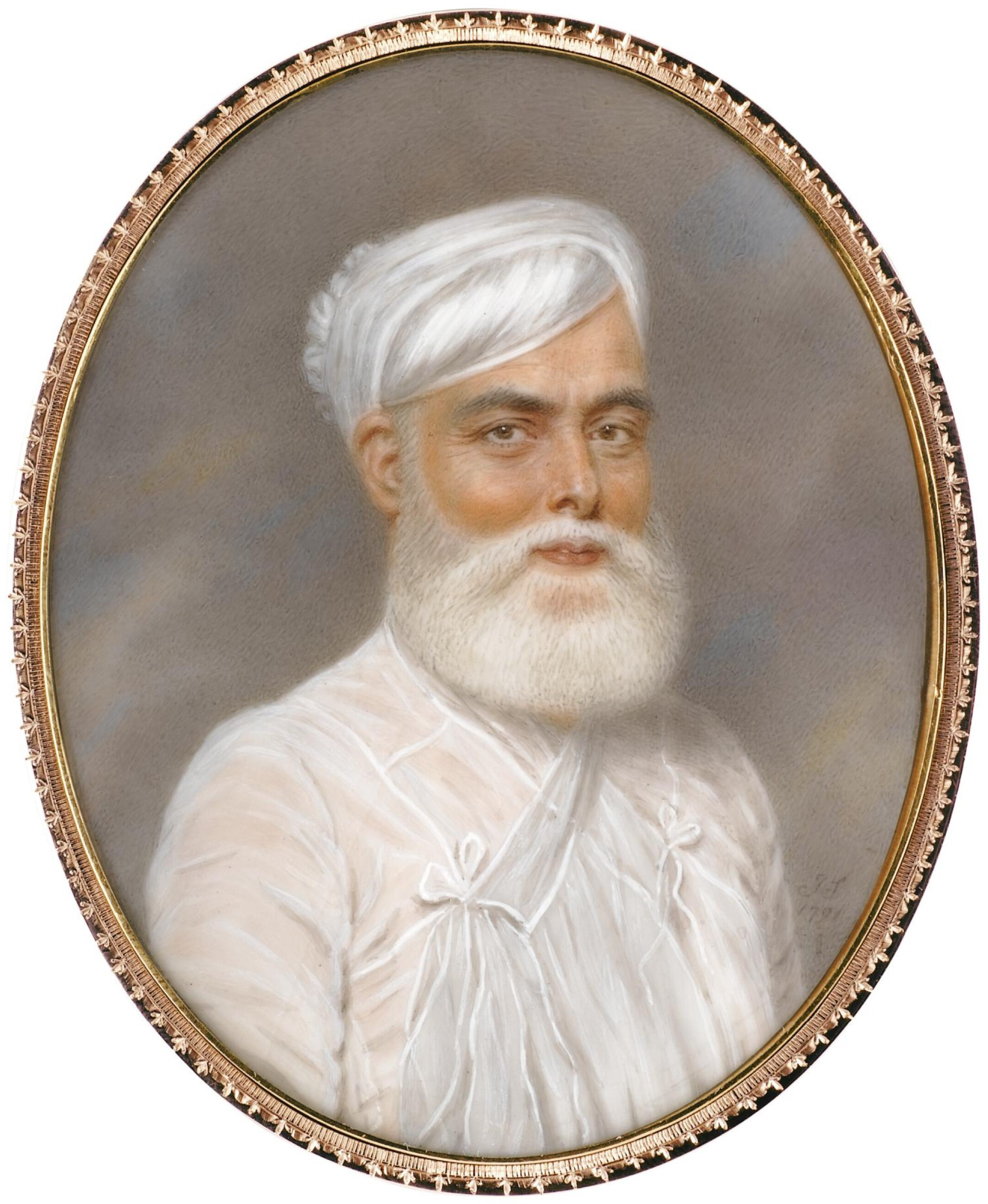
- Portrait by John Smart, 1791

Nawab of the Carnatic
- Reign: 3 August 1749 – 13 October 1795
- Predecessor: Anwaruddin Khan; Chanda Sahib(Disputed)
- Successor: Umdat ul-Umara
- Full name: Amir ul Hind, Walla Jah, 'Umdat ul-Mulk, Asaf ud-Daula, Nawab Muhammad 'Ali Anwar ud-din Khan Bahadur, Zafar Jang, Sipah-Salar, Sahib us-Saif wal-qalam Mudabbir-i-Umur-i-'Alam Farzand-i-'Aziz-az Jan, Biradarbi Jan-barabar [Nawab Jannat Aramgah], Subadar of the Carnatic.
- Born: 7 July 1717; Delhi, Mughal Empire (modern day India)
- Died: 13 October 1795 (aged 78); Chepauk, Maratha Empire (modern day Chennai, Tamil Nadu, India)
- Buried: Outside the gate of the Gunbad of Shah Chand Mastan, Tiruchirappalli
- Noble family: Rowther (Anwariyya Dynasty)
- Spouse: Nawab Begum Sahiba
- Issue: Muhammad Ishaq Khan; Umdat ul-Umara; Amir ul-Umara (eighteen sons and twenty-one daughters)
- Father: Anwaruddin Khan
- Mother: Fakhr un-nisa Begum Sahiba
- Military career
- Branch: Carnatic Sultanate
- Rank: Subedar
- Conflicts: Mughal-Maratha Wars, Seven Years' War, Carnatic Wars, Anglo-Mysore Wars, Siege of Arcot, Battle of Golden Rock

Muhammad Ali Khan Wallajah (7 July 1717 – 13 October 1795), or Muhammad Ali, Wallajah, was the Nawab of the Carnatic from 1749 until his death in 1795. He declared himself Nawab in 1749. This position was disputed between Wallajah and Chanda Sahib. In 1752, after several clashes, Chanda Sahib's forces and his French allies were expelled from Arcot, officially declaring Wallajah as Nawab on 26 August 1765. His reign was recognised by Mughal emperor Shah Alam II.

Wallajah was an ally of the British East India Company supporting them in the Carnatic Wars against Chanda Sahib. During his rule, the Carnatic region saw stronger ties with the British and growing influence of the British East India Company. This also limited French influence in the region. Wallajah constructed Chepauk Palace in 1768. This palace, commissioned by British financier Paul Benfield, incorporates Indo-Saracenic architecture and became the main residence of Wallajah. After the construction of this palace, Wallajah moved the capital from Arcot to Chepauk, which served as the capital of the Carnatic Sultanate until 1855.

== Early life ==
His father Anwaruddin Muhammed Khan, was the current Nawab of Carnatic of Qannauji Sheikh origin. Muhammad Ali Khan, however, claimed a prestigious Arab and Sayyid ancestry, but a modern study of the Walajah dynasty argues that the family was of indigenous origin and that Muhammad Ali Khan deliberately sought to elevate his nasab through a dynastic genealogy connecting his family to Quraysh, the second caliph Umar ibn al-Khattab, Central Asia, and the rulers of Kabul. His mother, Fakhr un-nisa Begum Sahiba, was the niece of Sayyid Ali Khan Safavi ul-Mosawi of Persia. She was also known by the title "Naib suba of Trichonopoly."

Wallajah was the Nawab of Arcot in 1749, but was officially crowned in 1752, after the defeat of Chanda Sahib's forces in the Siege of Arcot. Wallajah often referred to himself as the Subedar of the Carnatic in his letters and correspondence with the then Mughal Emperor Shah Alam II.

== Reign ==
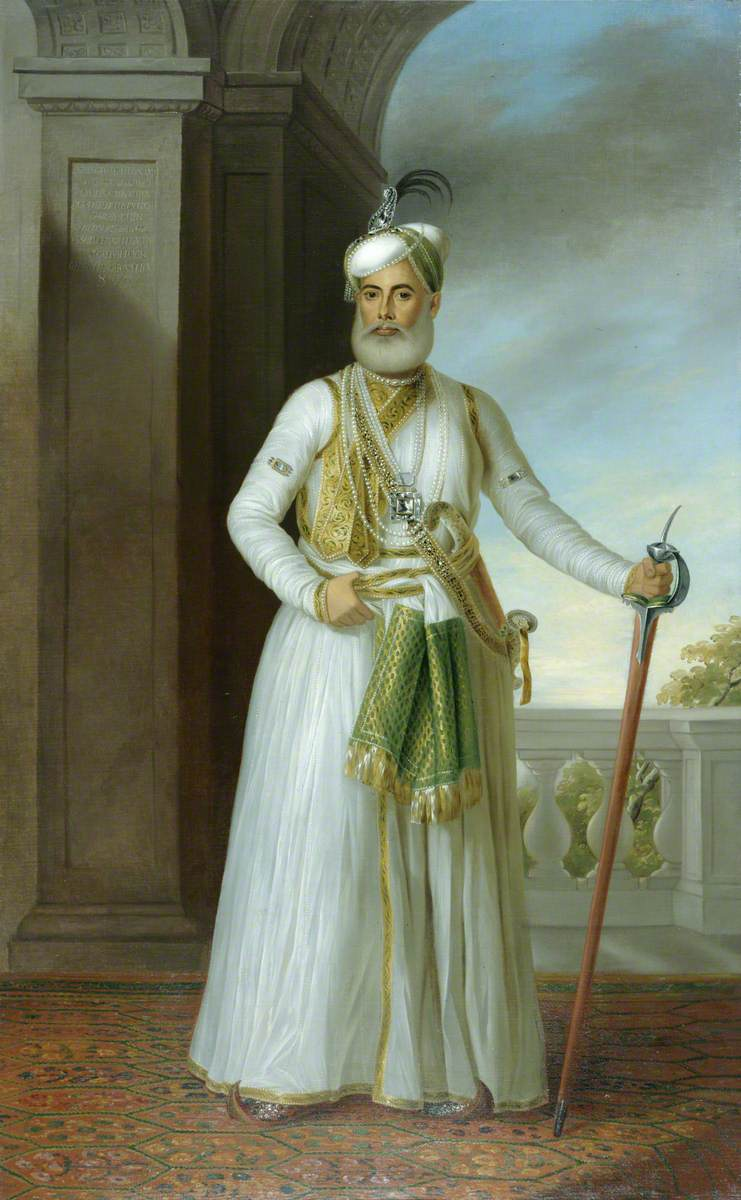
Portrait of Muhammad Ali Khan,

Muhammad Ali Khan Wallajah was granted the titles of "Siraj ud-Daula", Anwar ud-din Khan Bahadur, and Dilawar Jang, together with the Subadarship of the Carnatic Payeen Ghaut and a mensab of 5,000 zat and 5,000 sowar, the Mahi Maratib, Naubat, etc. by Imperial fireman on 5 April 1750. e Raised to the titles of Walla Jah and Sahib us-Saif wal-qalam (Master of the Sword and Qalam) Mudabbir-i-Umur-i-'Alam Farzand-i-'Aziz-az Jan by Emperor Shah Alam II in 1760, he was recognised by the Treaty of Paris as an independent ruler in 1763 and by the Emperor of Delhi 26 August 1765.

Wallajah has a good reputation among his people. He was also well liked by his British allies. Sir John Macpherson, writing to Lord George Macartney in November 1781 declared:

I love the old man... [Wallajah] mind me to my old Nabob [Nawab]. I have been sending him sheep and bags of rice by every ship. It is more than he did for me when I was fighting his battles.

— Sir John Macpherson

The Nawab was an ally of the British East India Company, but also harboured great ambitions of power in the South Indian arena, where Hyder Ali of the Mysore, the Marathas, and the Nizam of Hyderabad were constant rivals. The Nawab could also be unpredictable and devious, and his breach of promise in failing to surrender Tiruchirappalli to Hyder Ali in 1751 was at the root of many confrontations between Hyder Ali and the British.

When Hyder Ali swept into the Carnatic towards Arcot on 23 July 1780, with an army estimated at 86–100,000 men, it was not the Nawab however, but the British who had provoked Hyder Ali's wrath, by seizing the French port of Mahé which was under his protection. Much of the ensuing war was fought on the Nawab's territory.

By the 1780s the Carnatic Sultanate was in debt from previous conflicts. Because of Wallajah alliance with the British this had a negative impact on the East India Company.

For the defence of his territory, the Nawab paid the British 400,000 pagodas per annum (about £160,000) and 10 out of the 21 battalions of the Madras army were posted to garrison his forts. The British derived income from his jagirs (land grants).

== Carnatic Wars ==
=== Siege of Trichinopoly ===
Following the Battle of Ambur in 1749, that Wallajah's father Anwaruddin Muhammed Khan was slain, Wallajah fled to Trichinopoly. Chanda Sahib, assisted by Joseph François Dupleix, had planned to besiege Muhammed there in 1749, but the need for funding and provisions led him to instead besiege Tanjore first, and movements of Chanda Sahib's Maratha enemies prompted him to lift that siege and move north to face the new threat.

In April 1752 British reinforcements led by Stringer Lawrence and Robert Clive assisted Wallajah. On 9 April Lawrence made a junction with troops sent out of Trichinopoly and made it inside the lines. Two days later he led a sortie on the besiegers, prompting Law to lift the siege and retreat to the isle of Srirangam.

Chanda eventually negotiated a surrender to Maratha forces from Tanjore that had arrived to assist the British, believing this to be preferable to surrendering to the British.

=== Siege of Arcot ===
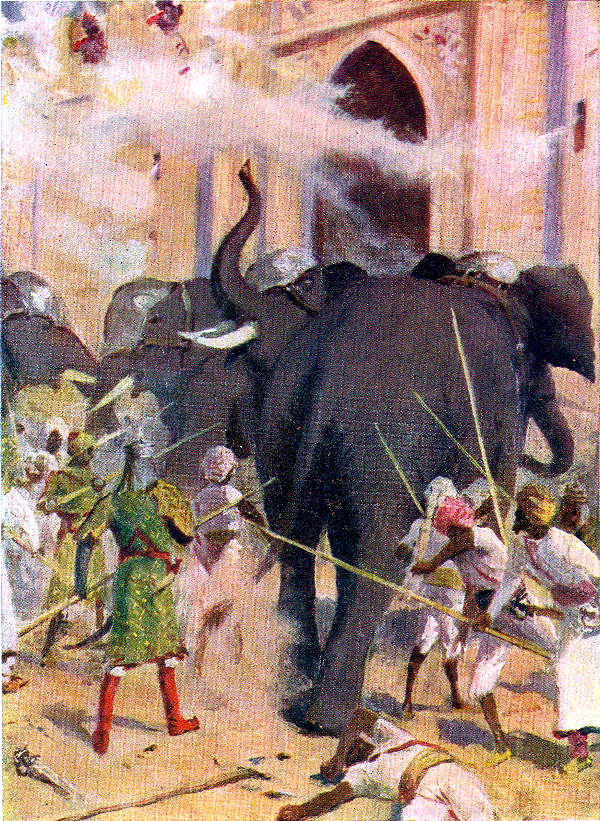
Wallajah and his British allies attack Chanda Sahib's war elephant

On 26 August 1751, Wallajah sent 600 troops to sack Arcot. He was supported by 200 of the 350 British soldiers. Those 200 soldiers and a further 300 sepoys along with 3 small guns and eight European officers marched towards Arcot from Madras.

When apprised of the loss of Arcot, Chanda Sahib immediately dispatched to recapture it with 4,000 of his best troops with 150 of the French, under the command of his son, Raza Sahib. On 23 September Raza Sahib entered the town and invested the fort with an army of 2,000 native regular troops, 5,000 irregulars, 120 Europeans, and 300 cavalry.

On 14 November, Raza Sahib attacked British forces allied to Wallajah, during the festival of the Moharram and in memory of Hassan (son of Wallajah). On 13 November, a spy alerted Clive to the oncoming assault. Where the moat was dry the assailants mounted with great boldness, but the British fire was heavy and well directed that they made no progress. Wallajah and British forces were victorious. After this battle, Wallajah was officially declared the Nawab of Arcot.

=== Battle of Golden Rock ===
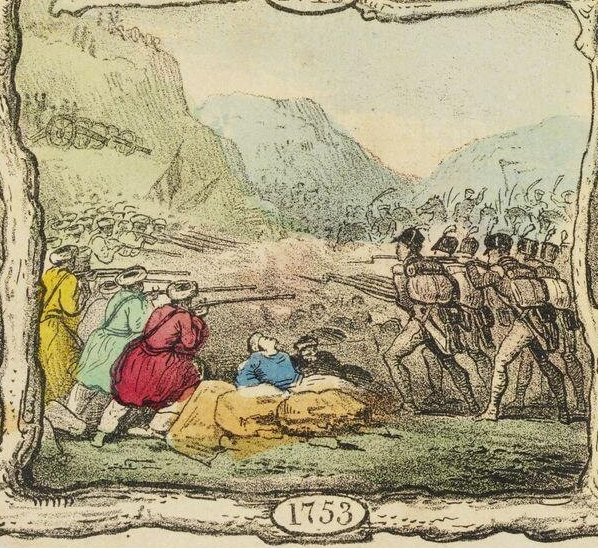
Wallajah's men assisting the British at the Battle of Golden Rock in 1753.

26 June 1753, Wallajah supported British forces against the French, assisted by Mysorean troops led by Monsieur Astruc. Wallajah sent his men to assist the British. He also met with British commander Stringer Lawrence do discuss their alliance. The British were victorious in this battle and maintained their influence in Trichinopoly.

== Chepauk Palace ==
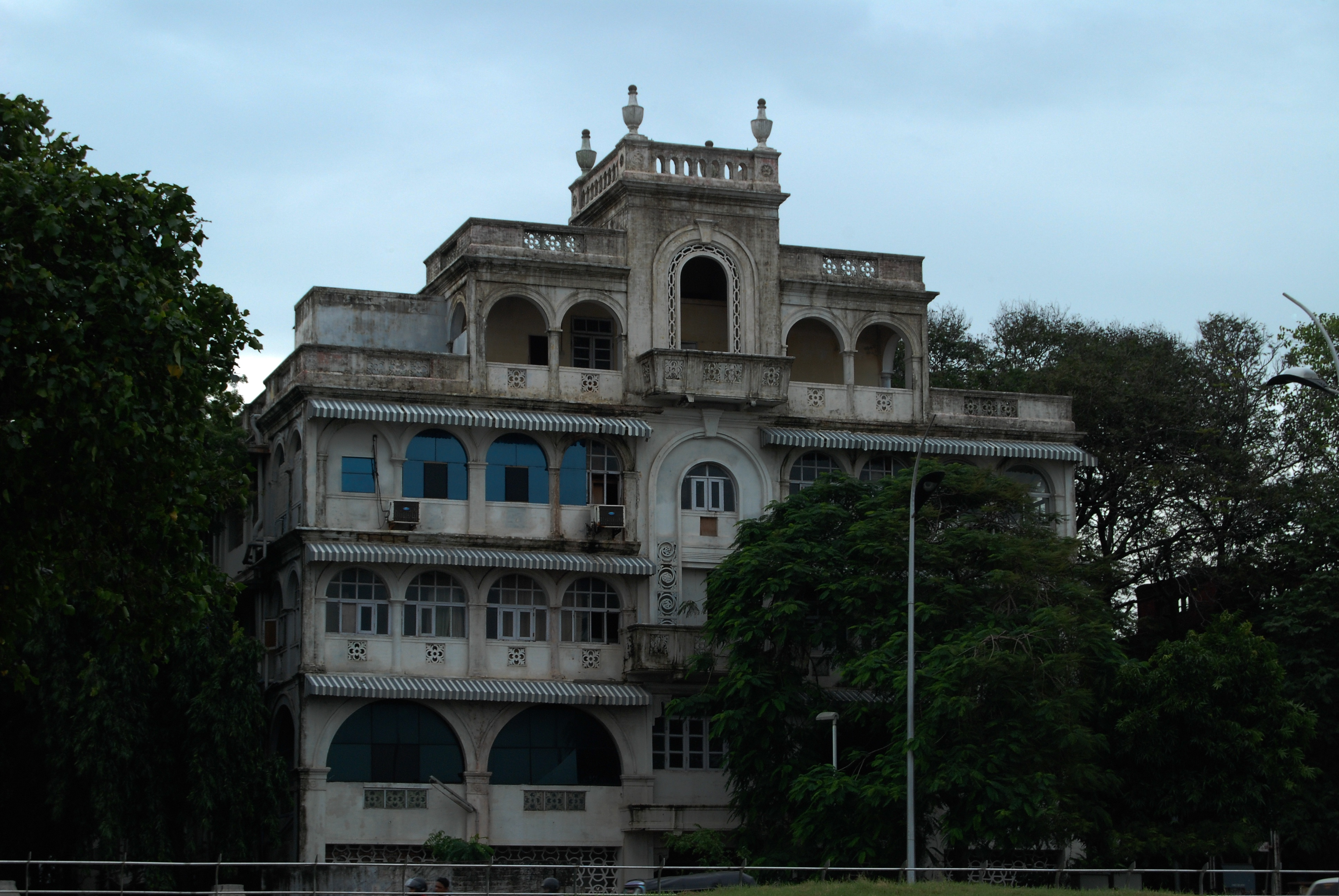
Chepauk Palace

In 1764, after the Carnatic Wars, Wallajah wanted to construct a Palace within the boundaries of British Fort St. George. This would act as his residence, and closer ties with the East India Company. However, due to Space restrictions, this plan was scrapped. Instead, Wallajah constructed a palace in Chepauk which eventually become the capital.

It was built by the engineer Paul Benfield, who completed it in 1768. It was one of the first buildings in India to be designed in the Indo-Saracenic style. According to historian S. Muthiah: "Paul Benfield, an East India Company engineer turned contractor, who had a good reputation

The Palace was completed in 1768. The palace comprises two blocks, namely, Kalas Mahal and Humayun Mahal. Kalas Mahal became Wallajah's the official residence.

Originally Humayun Mahal had been single story with the Diwan-e-Khana Durbar Hall in its middle over which there was a dome. To transform Humayun Mahal, Chisholm removed the tower, added a first floor and Madras terraced roof. He also added a facade that matched the Khalsa Mahal, which can be seen from the Wallajah Salai. To compensate for removing the dome he also added a new eastern entrance, also in the style of the Khalsa Mahal, that faces the beach. Political influence

For a period the situation of the Nawab was a significant factor in Westminster politics. The Nawab had borrowed heavily; and many East India Company officials, in India or in the United Kingdom, were his creditors.

== Death ==
He died from gangrene poisoning, at Madras on 13 October 1795. He was buried outside the gate of the Gunbad of Shah Chand Mastan, Trichinopoly.

He was succeeded by his son Umdat ul-Umara, who was later accused of supporting Tipu Sultan the heir of Hyder Ali during the Fourth Anglo-Mysore War.

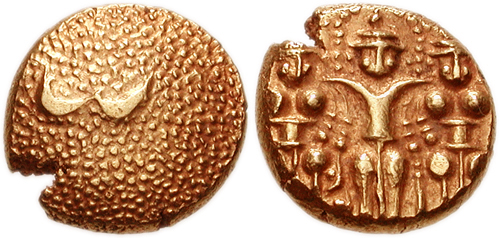
Coin of Muhammad Ali Khan Wallajah containing images of Hindu goddesses. Many of his coins were contained Tamil and Persian Script.

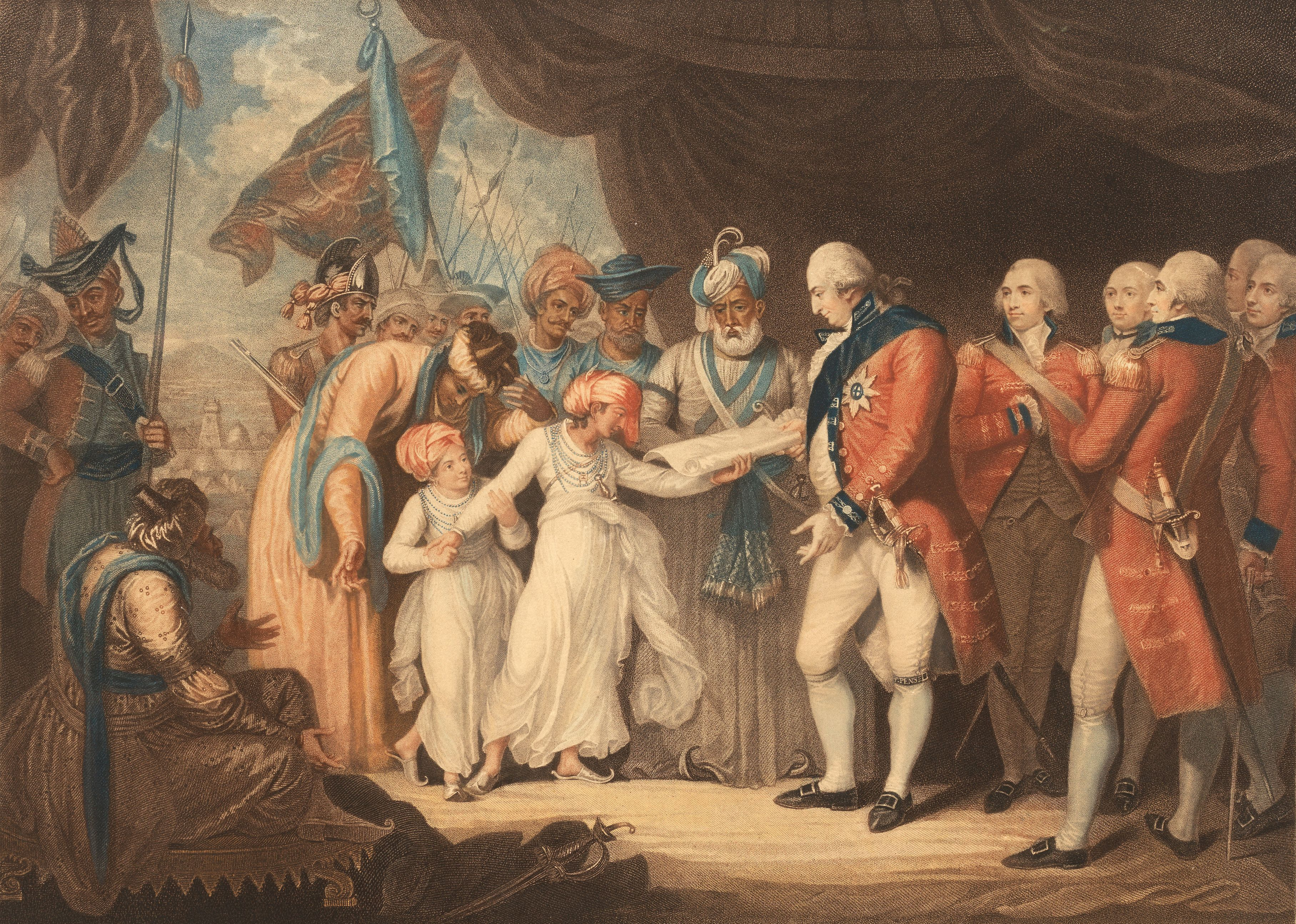
Wallajah witnessing two of Tipu Sultan's sons being taken hostage to Vellore on 26 February 1792 during the Third Anglo-Mysore War

Muhammad Ali Khan Wallajah meeting with Stringer Lawrence

== See also ==
- Nawabs of Arcot

== Notes ==
Preceded by Chanda Sahib	Nawab of Carnatic (de facto) (Confirmed by Carnatic Treaty of 1754); 1752 – 13 October 1795	Succeeded by Umdat ul-Umara
Preceded by Anwaruddin Khan	Nawab of Carnatic (de jure) (Confirmed by 1763 Treaty of Paris); 3 August 1749 – 13 October 1795	Succeeded by Umdat ul-Umara
