= Lawrence Palk =

Lawrence Palk may refer to:

- Sir Lawrence Palk, 2nd Baronet (?1766–1813)
- Lawrence Vaughan Palk, 3rd baronet (1793–1860)
- Lawrence Palk, 1st Baron Haldon, 4th baronet (1818–1883)
