= Walter Palk =

English politician

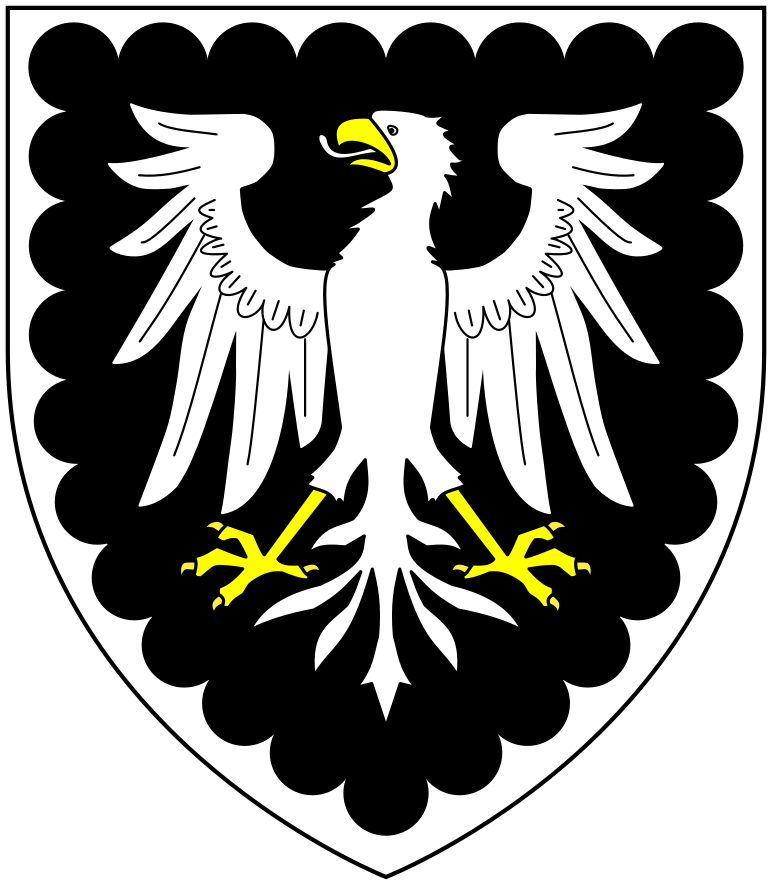
Arms granted in 1760 to "Robert Palk of Headborough in the county of Devon" (later Sir Robert Palk, 1st Baronet), uncle of Walter Palk (1742–1819): Sable, an eagle displayed argent beaked and legged or a bordure engrailed of the second

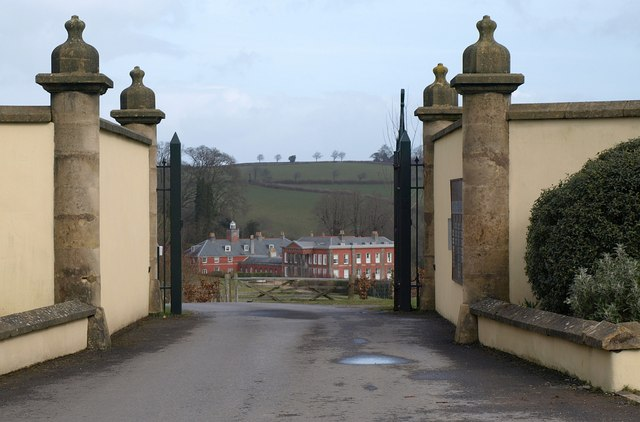
Marley House, a Georgian mansion built by Walter Palk (17421819) in the parish of Rattery in Devon, renamed "Syon Abbey" in 1925 when the formerly exiled community of nuns whose antecedents were from Syon Monastery, Twickenham, Middlesex, dissolved by King Henry VIII, took up residence

Walter Palk (1742–1819), of Marley House (later renamed Syon Abbey) in the parish of Rattery, Devon, England, was a Member of Parliament for his family's Pocket Borough of Ashburton in Devon from 1796 to 1811. He served as Sheriff of Devon (1791–92) and in 1798 was a Captain in the Ashburton Volunteer Militia, one of many such units formed across Devon to counter a possible invasion by Napoleon.

== Origins ==
He was the eldest son of Walter Palk (d.1801) of Headborough and Yolland Hill, in the parish of Ashburton, a small farmer and clothier, by his first wife Thomasine Withecombe of Priestaford, Ashburton. His uncle was the wealthy Sir Robert Palk, 1st Baronet (1717-1798) of Haldon House in the parish of Kenn, in Devon, an officer of the British East India Company who served as Governor of the Madras Presidency, later an MP for Ashburton in 1767 and between 1774 and 1787 and for Wareham, between 1768 and 1774.

== Landholdings ==
Shortly before 1810 he purchased the manor of Rattery together with several local estates, and built Marley House, a large Georgian country house, as his new seat within the parish of Rattery.

== Marriage and children ==
On 15 February 1782 he married Elizabeth Lyde, by whom he had two daughters, only one of whom survived:

- Elizabeth Palk, only daughter and sole heiress, who in 1806 married Sir Henry Carew, 7th Baronet (1779–1830) of Haccombe in Devon.

Parliament of Great Britain
Preceded by Sir Lawrence Palk, 2nd Baronet; Robert Mackreth	Member of Parliament for Ashburton; 1796–1800; With: Robert Mackreth	Succeeded by Parliament of the United Kingdom
Parliament of the United Kingdom
Preceded by Parliament of Great Britain	Member of Parliament for Ashburton; 1800–1811; With: Robert Mackreth (1800–02); Sir Hugh Inglis, 1st Baronet (1802–06); Hon. Gilbert Elliot (1806–07); Lord Charles Bentinck (1807–11)	Succeeded by John Sullivan; Lord Charles Bentinck
