= Thomas Betson =

Thomas Betson may refer to:

- Thomas Betson (merchant) (died 1486), English merchant
- Thomas Betson (writer) (died 1516), English religious author and librarian

== See also ==
- Thomas Bateson (c. 1570–1630), also known as Batson or Betson, Anglo-Irish composer of madrigals and vocal church music
