= Luscombe, Rattery =

Historic estate in the parish of Rattery in Devon, England

Coordinates: 50.460°N 3.765°W

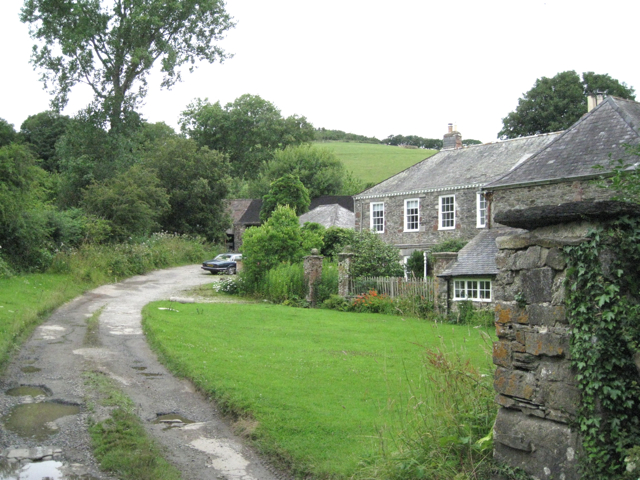
Luscombe

Luscombe is an historic estate situated in the parish of Rattery in Devon.

== History ==
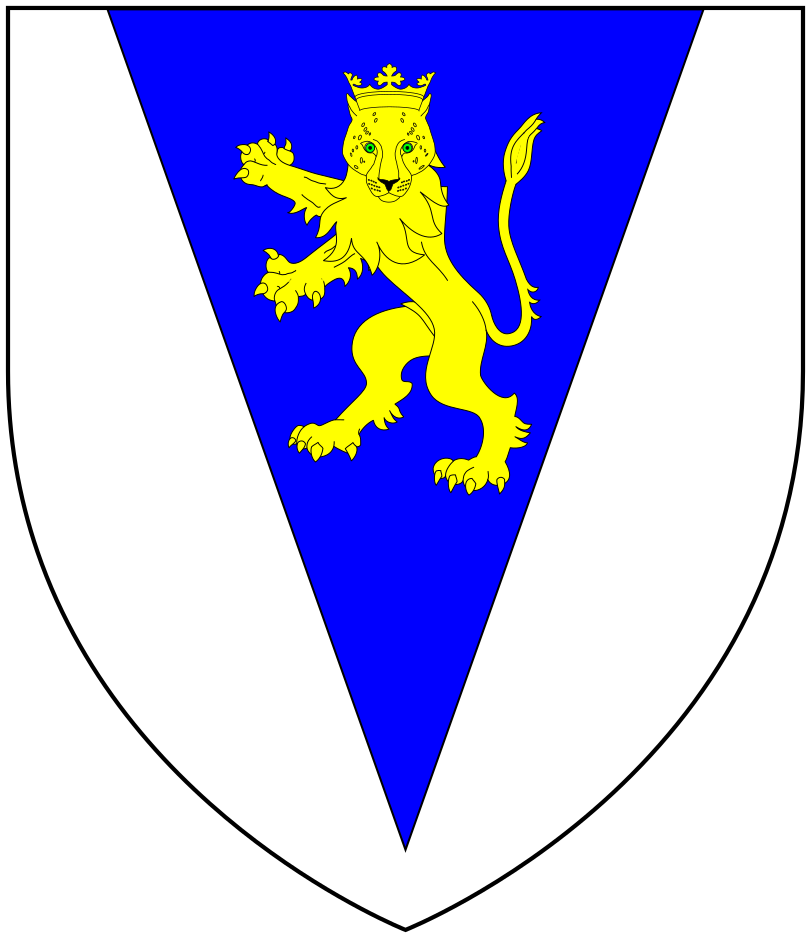
Arms of Luscombe of Luscombe: Argent, on a pile azure a lion rampant guardant crowned or

Loscume is an estate mentioned in the Domesday Book of 1086, not as a separate entry, but as an estate mentioned within the entry for the manor of Dartington. Dartington is listed in the Domesday Book as Dertrintone, the 15th of the 17 Devonshire holdings of William de Falaise, feudal baron of Stogursey, Somerset, one of the Devon Domesday Book tenants-in-chief of King William the Conqueror. Luscombe comprised one ferling of land within the manor of Dartington and was held from William of Falaise by his tenant Ansketel. Luscombe was later the seat of the Luscombe (originally de Luscombe) family from before the 16th century to shortly before 1810. As was usual, the family had taken their surname from their seat. Shortly before 1810 it was sold by the Luscombe family to Walter Palk (1742-1819), MP for Ashburton (1796-1811), who had purchased the manor of Rattery together with several local estates, and built Marley House, a large Georgian country house, as his new seat within the parish of Rattery.

It should not be confused with Luscombe Castle, a 19th-century country house near Dawlish, about 16 miles (26 km) to the north-east.

The artist Yasmin David lived at Luscombe for most of her life, from 1923 to her death in 2009.
