= Sir Lawrence Palk, 2nd Baronet =

British politician, c. 1766–1813

Sir Lawrence Palk Bt

Member of Parliament for Ashburton
- In office 1787–1796 Serving with Sir Robert Mackreth

Member of Parliament for Devon
- In office 1796–1812 Serving with John Pollexfen Bastard

Personal details
- Born: c.1766 Madras, India
- Died: 20 June 1813 (aged 46–47)
- Spouse(s): Lady Mary Bligh (m. 1789–1791) Lady Dorothy Vaughan (m. 1792)
- Education: Harrow School; Christ Church, Oxford

Military service
- Allegiance: United Kingdom
- Branch/service: Militia
- Rank: Major
- Unit: South Devon Militia

Sir Lawrence Palk, 2nd Baronet (c.1766 – 20 June 1813) was a British politician and landowner. A member of parliament for Ashburton, a rotten borough controlled by his family, from 1787 to 1796, and then for Devon from 1796 to 1812, Palk was predominantly independent in his political dealings, although a supporter of Henry Addington. Suffering badly from gout, Palk chose not to contest the 1812 United Kingdom general election and died in the following year.

== Early life ==
Lawrence Palk was born in Madras, India, in about 1766. He was the son of Robert Palk, the Governor of Madras, and Anne née Vansittart. His godfather was Major-General Stringer Lawrence, who left part of his fortune to Palk upon his death. Palk was educated at Harrow School before he graduated from Christ Church, Oxford, on 29 March 1784. In July 1785 he embarked on a Grand Tour, with the theologian Henry Beeke accompanying him as tutor. Palk visited Switzerland, Germany, and Holland, before returning to Britain in September 1786. The family seat was Haldon House in Devon.

== Political career ==
Palk's father was one of the controlling owners of the rotten borough of Ashburton, Devon, holding the seat personally. In 1787 the elder Palk chose to put his son forward in his place, and on 12 March Palk became member of parliament for Ashburton. Not politically aligned with either government or opposition in his early years in parliament, Palk made no contributions until 1792 when on 1 March he voted against sending an ultimatum to Russia on its occupation of Ochakiv.

At the 1796 British general election Palk stood for Ashburton and the county seat of Devon. Elected to both seats, he chose to sit for Devon, leaving his cousin Walter Palk to take the family position at Ashburton. While William Pitt the Younger's government had hoped Palk would support them, he remained independent as representative for Devon. He voted against the Bank Restriction Act 1797 and the Land Tax Perpetuation Act 1798. With the Irish Rebellion of 1798 ongoing, he also opposed the idea that British militia would be sent across to help stem the rebellion. He did this despite being a major in the South Devon Militia, and added in his speech the addendum that if his unit was ordered to Ireland he would go.

On 29 April 1798 Palk's father died, leaving him to inherit the Palk baronetcy. His only other parliamentary speech was a remark on the Corn Laws in 1800. By this point he began to suffer from gout, inhibiting his parliamentary participation. He was a supporter of the Addington ministry, and when Pitt returned to power in 1804 Palk continued as a satellite of Henry Addington. By 1809 Palk's gout had severely crippled him. He obtained two weeks of sick leave at the end of 1810, but was able to return to parliament to oppose the Care of King During his Illness, etc. Act 1811 on 21 January. When the 1812 United Kingdom general election was called, Palk's very poor health forced him to retire from his seat and not contest the election. He died on 20 June 1813.

== Personal life ==
Palk married Lady Mary Bligh, the daughter of John Bligh, 3rd Earl of Darnley, on 7 August 1789. They had one son before she died on 4 March 1791. Palk then married Lady Dorothy Elizabeth Vaughan, the daughter of Wilmot Vaughan, 1st Earl of Lisburne, on 15 May 1792. Together they had six sons and two daughters.

A shy man beset by illness, Palk was nonetheless described positively in 1809 by the diarist Joseph Farington; "his countenance had all the expression of good humour, and his deportment was simple and unassuming." Palk, who owned and invested in a large part of Torquay, was rumoured to have an annual income of £15,000 (equivalent to £1,047,518 in 2025).

== Citations ==
Parliament of Great Britain
Preceded by Sir Robert Palk; Robert Mackreth	Member of Parliament for Ashburton; 1787–1796; With: Sir Robert Mackreth	Succeeded by Walter Palk; Sir Robert Mackreth
Parliament of the United Kingdom
Preceded by John Rolle; John Pollexfen Bastard	Member of Parliament for Devon; 1796–1812; With: John Pollexfen Bastard	Succeeded by Sir Thomas Dyke Acland; John Pollexfen Bastard
Baronetage of Great Britain
Preceded by Robert Palk	Baronet (of Haldon House); 1798–1813	Succeeded by Lawrence Palk
