= Sir Henry Carew, 7th Baronet =

British baronet

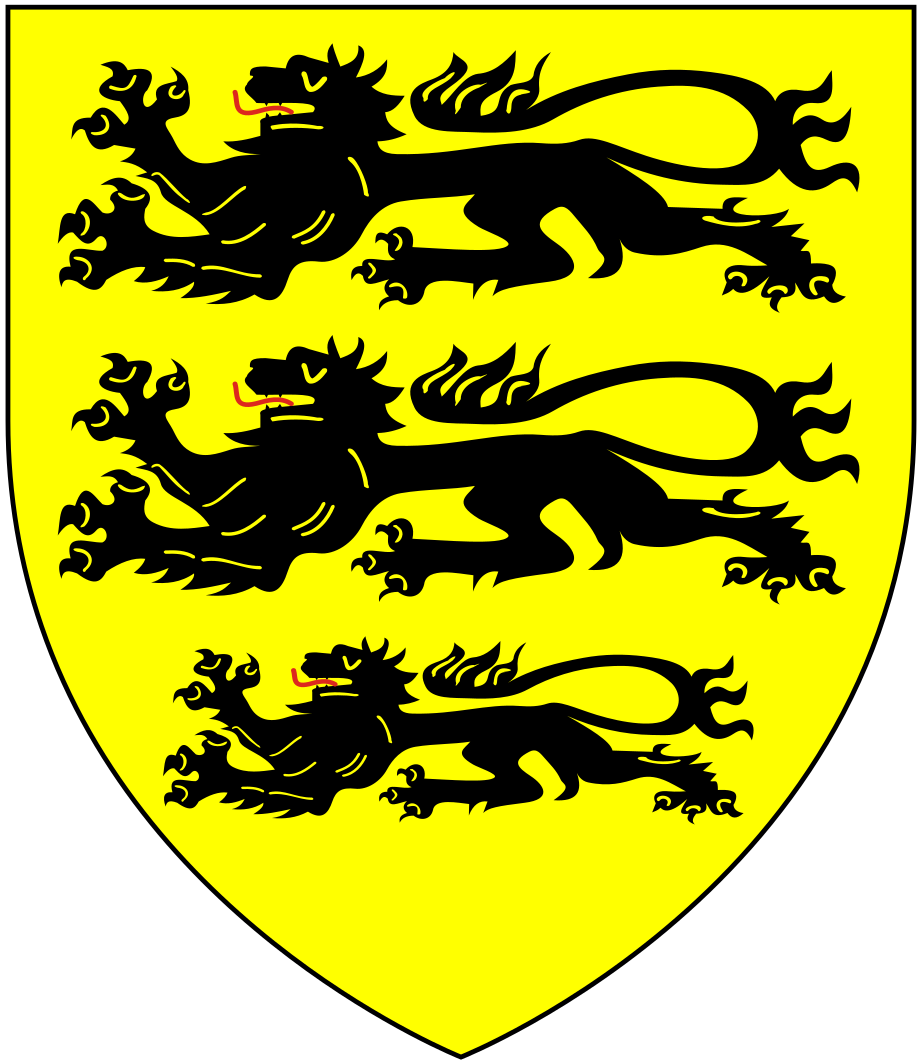
Arms of Carew: Or, three lions passant in pale sable

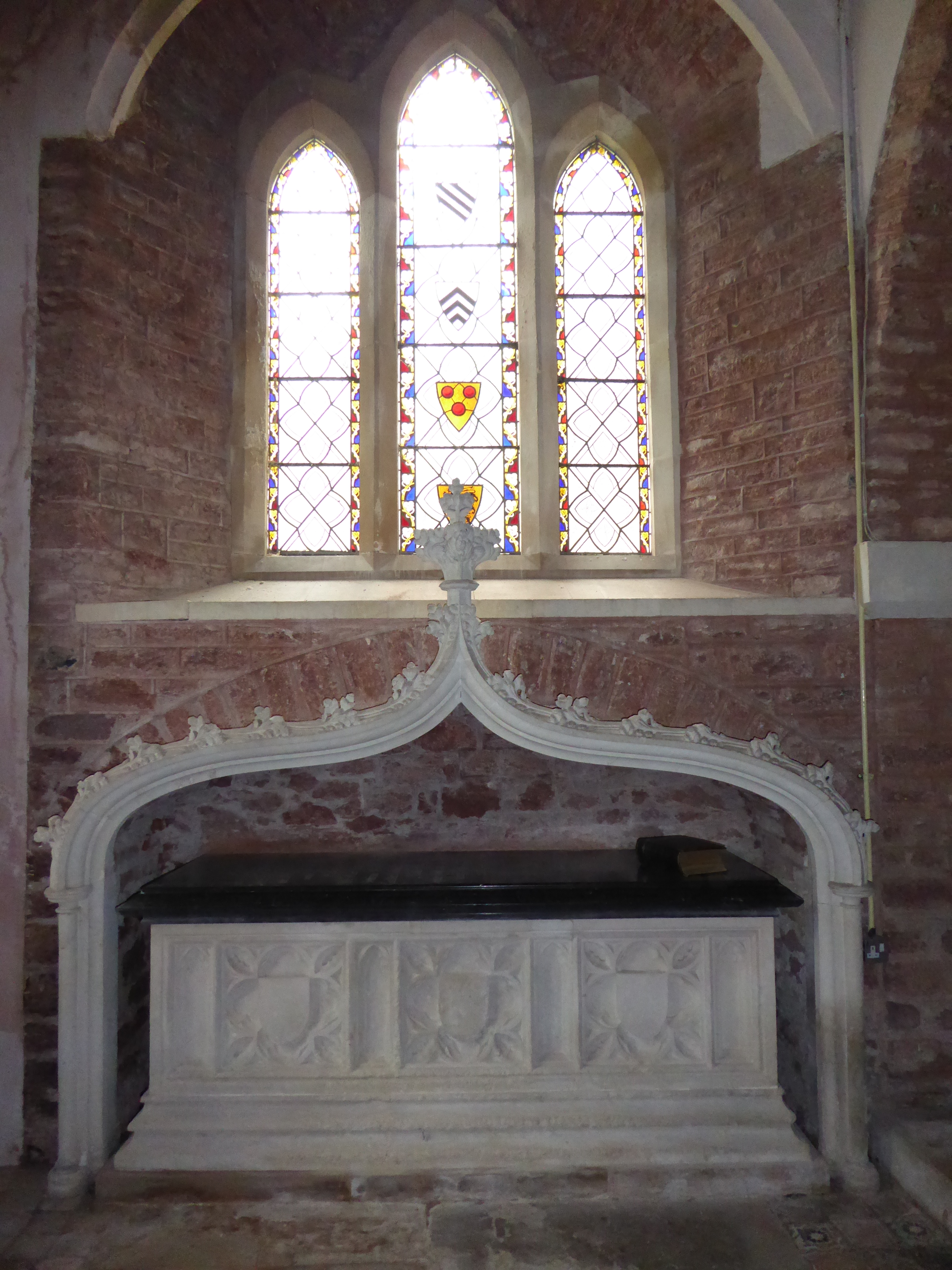
Monument to Sir Henry Carew, 7th Baronet, Haccombe Church

Sir Henry Carew, 7th Baronet (1779–1830) of Haccombe in Devon, was a member of the landed gentry of Devon.

== Origins ==
He was the eldest son and heir of Sir Thomas Carew, 6th Baronet (c. 1755–1805) of Haccombe, by his wife Jane Smallwood, a daughter of Rev. James Smallwood. According to the Parish Register his parents married in Kirkoswald, Cumberland "1777, June 19th. S’r Thomas Carew of Haccomb in the county of Devon & Diocese of Exeter Bart. and Jane Smalwood of this parish."

== Marriage and children ==
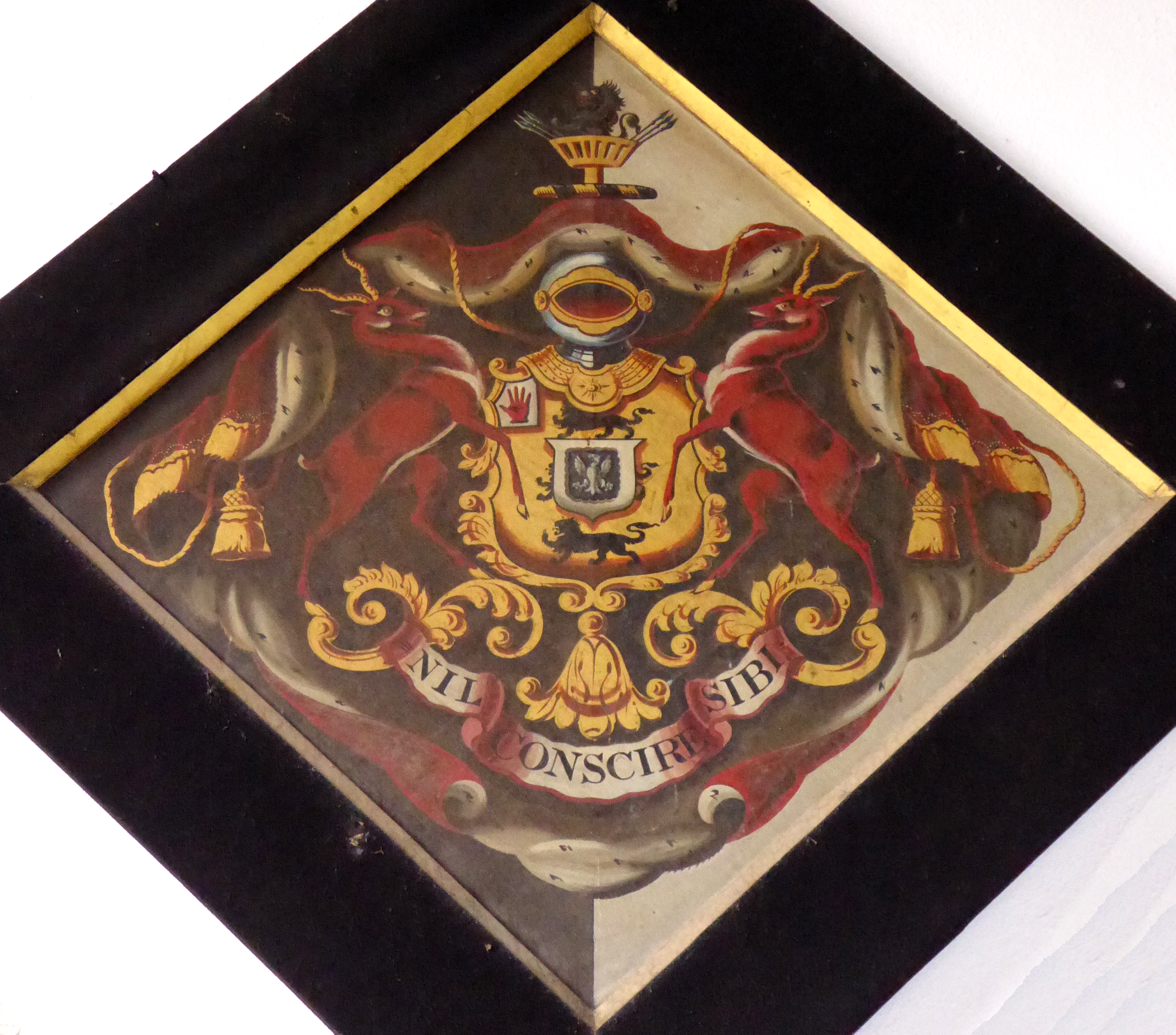
Funerary hatchment of Sir Henry Carew, 7th Baronet in Haccombe Church, showing heraldic achievement of Carew (with canton Red Hand of Ulster) with inescutcheon of pretence of Palk (Sable, an eagle displayed argent beaked and legged or a bordure engrailed of the second)

In 1806 he married Elizabeth Palk (1786-1862), only surviving daughter and sole heiress of Walter Palk (1742-1819), of Marley House in the parish of Rattery, Devon, a Member of Parliament for his family's Pocket Borough of Ashburton in Devon from 1796 to 1811, Sheriff of Devon (1791-2) and in 1798 a Captain in the Ashburton Volunteer Militia. By his wife he had children including:

- Sir Walter Palk Carew, 8th Baronet (1807–1874) of Haccombe, eldest son and heir, whose own son Capt. Walter Palk Carew (1838-1873), Royal Horse Guards, predeceased his father by one year without children.
- Henry Carew (1808-1871), 2nd son, father of Sir Henry Palk Carew, 9th Baronet (1870–1934).
- Thomas Carew (1810-1876), 3rd son, who married Charlotte Curtis, a daughter of Sir William Curtis, 2nd Baronet (1782–1847) of Cullands Grove, Southgate in the County of Middlesex.
- Rev. Robert Palk Carew (1818-1875), 4th son, Vicar of Rattery, who married Charlotte Hornsby, widow of rev. R.C. Clifton, a Canon of Manchester and rector of Somerton, Oxford.

== Death, burial & monument ==
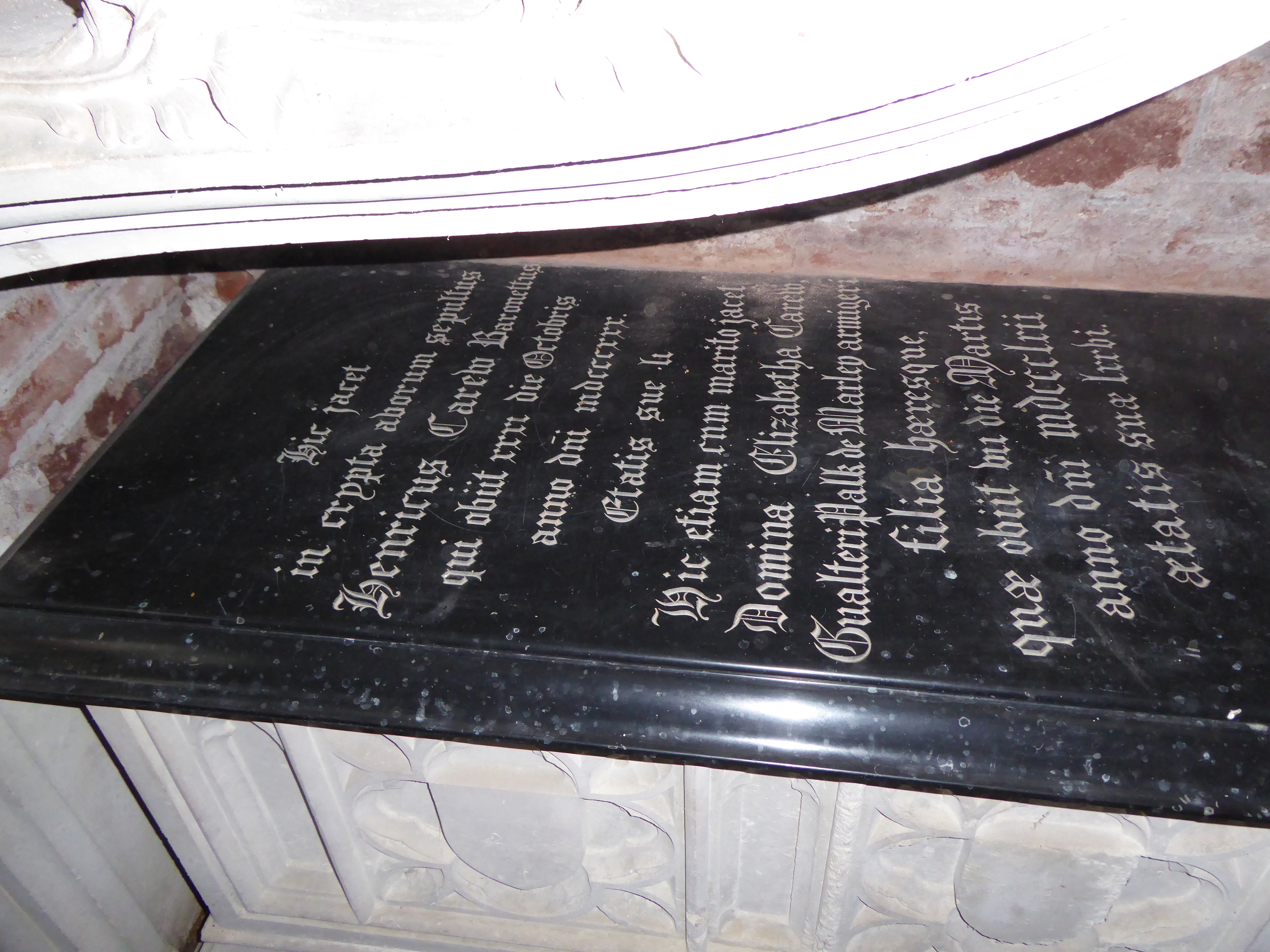
Inscribed Purbeck marble ledger stone on chest tomb of Sir Henry Carew, 7th Baronet, Haccombe Church

He died on 31 October 1830 and was buried in the family vault beneath St Blaise's Church, Haccombe, next to Haccombe House, which church was a peculiar of the Archbishop of Canterbury and was served by an archpriest who was not subject to the authority of the Bishop of Exeter as were all other parish priests in Devonshire. His monument survives at the east end of the north aisle, consisting of a chest tomb within an Easter sepulchre-type niche, beneath a stained glass window. The top of the chest tomb is a slab of polished Purbeck marble engraved in Latin in Gothic text as follows, in imitation of mediaeval monuments:

Hic jacet in crypta aborum sepultus Henricus Carew Baronettus qui obiit XXXI die Octobris anno d(omi)ni MDCCCXXX (a)etatis su(a)e LI. Hic etiam cum marito jacet Domina Elizabetha Carew Gualteri Palk de Marley armigeri filia haeresque quae obiit VII die Martis (sic) anno d(omi)ni MDCCCLXII aetatis suae LXXVI

Which may be translated as:

"Here lies buried in the crypt ..... Henry Carew, Baronet, who died on the 31st day of October in the year of our Lord 1830 (in the year) of his age 51. Here also with her husband lies Lady Elizabeth Carew, daughter and heiress of Walter Palk of Marley, Esquire, who died on the 7th day of March in the year of our Lord 1862 (in the year) of her age 76".

Above is a three-light lancet window, the middle one displaying the arms of his ancestors who all held Haccombe successively, namely (from top to bottom) de Haccombe, Archdeckne, Courtenay and Carew.

Baronetage of England
Preceded by Thomas Carew	Baronet (of Haccombe); 1805–1830	Succeeded by Walter Carew
