= Sir Robert Palk, 1st Baronet =

Sir Robert Palk Bt
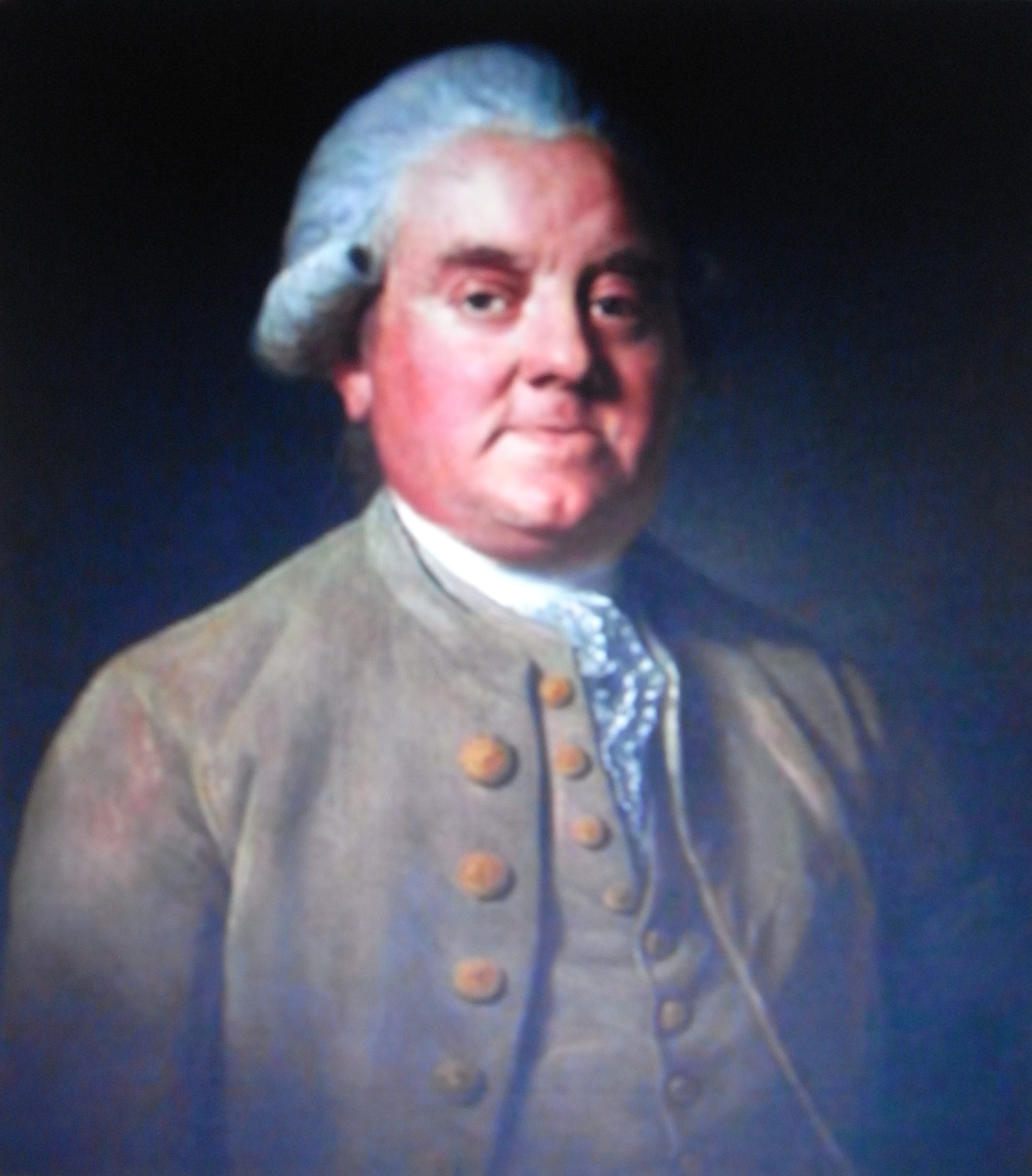

President of the British East India Company
- In office 14 November 1763 – 25 January 1767
- Preceded by: George Pigot
- Succeeded by: Charles Bourchier

Personal details
- Born: December 1717 Ashburton
- Died: 29 April 1798 (aged 80) Haldon House
- Spouse: Anne Vansittart

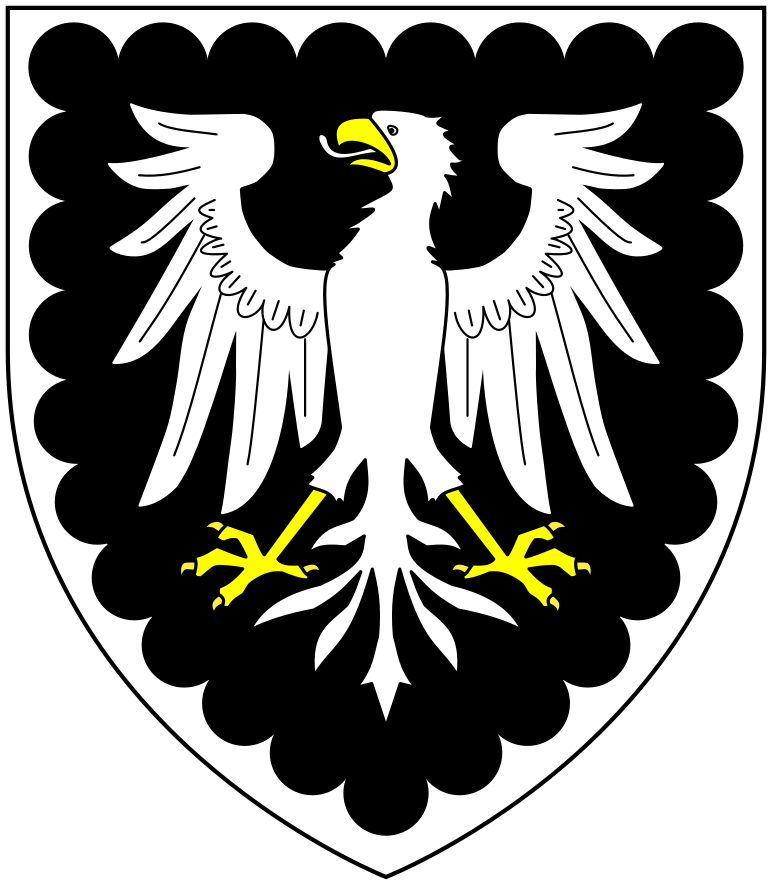
Arms granted in 1760 to "Robert Palk of Headborough in the county of Devon": Sable, an eagle displayed argent beaked and legged or a bordure engrailed of the second

Sir Robert Palk, 1st Baronet (December 1717 – 29 April 1798) of Haldon House in the parish of Kenn, in Devon, England, was an officer of the British East India Company who served as Governor of the Madras Presidency. In England he served as MP for Ashburton in 1767 and between 1774 and 1787 and for Wareham, between 1768 and 1774.

== Origins ==
Robert Palk was born in December 1717 at Lower Headborough Farm in the parish of Ashburton, Devon, and was baptised on 16 December 1717 at the Old Mission House, Ashburton. His father was Walter Palk, born in 1686, of yeoman farmer stock and his mother was Frances Abraham, the daughter of Robert Abraham. Walter Palk supplemented his income by acting as a carrier of serge from the cloth mills at Ashburton over Haldon Hill to market at Exeter. Robert had a sister Grace Palk and a brother Walter Palk, whose son, and Robert's nephew, was Walter Palk (1742–1819) of Marley House in the parish of Rattery, Devon, a Member of Parliament for his family's Pocket Borough of Ashburton in Devon from 1796 to 1811, Sheriff of Devon (1791-2) and in 1798 a Captain in the Ashburton Volunteer Militia. It was Robert who was to bring the family fame and fortune. According to Robert's own statements, the Palk family was resident at Ambrooke in the late 15th century, which at the time of Robert's birth in 1717 was owned by the Neyle family. This would therefore appear to discount suppositions in some sources that Robert himself was born at Ambrooke.

== Education ==
He was educated at Ashburton Grammar School, and was subsequently sponsored by his maternal uncle and godfather Robert Abraham, to attend Wadham College, Oxford, where he graduated in 1739.

== Career ==
Palk was ordained as a deacon in 1739 at Exeter Cathedral by Bishop Weston and held two curacies in Cornwall at Egloskerry and Launcells, before going to London in 1741. During his time in London he attracted the attention and favour of Sir Robert Walpole, generally regarded as the first Prime Minister of Great Britain, under whose auspices he was sent to India.

In 1747 he was appointed naval chaplain to Admiral Edward Boscawen on the Namura, bound for India. He arrived at Fort St David in 1748, at the time when the French were in control of Fort St George in Madras, and vying with the British for trade supremacy. Initially this rivalry was merely a trade war, with only a minimal presence of armed troops, whose task it was to guard the warehouses. Soon however the situation evolved into armed fighting between the French and British, and eventually the British Government recognised they were at war with France over control of India. General Stringer Lawrence was given the task of forming an army, and history now remembers him as the "Father of the Indian Army". An Act of Parliament was passed in 1773 which effectively took control of Indian interests away from the East India Company and its shareholders and placed it into the hands of The Crown.

== Promotion ==
Early in 1749 the chaplain at Fort St David, Francis Fordyce, publicly insulted Robert Clive, leading to his dismissal, and replacement by Robert Palk. This important promotion led to disagreements regarding the seniority of Palk over other chaplains. Palk sailed to Bombay in October 1750 with the intention of resigning his post and seeking formal employment with the East India Company. However, matters were resolved and he was re-instated and returned to Fort St David in March 1751. It was at this time that Palk made the acquaintance of Stringer Lawrence, after which time they remained lifelong friends.

Robert Clive was an army officer in the East India Company and later became Governor of Bengal. He arrived in India almost penniless, and due to his hard work and dedication to the King and the East India Company, he was well rewarded with many opportunities by his mentor, Stringer Lawrence. He later became the 1st Baron Clive of Plassey and made a fortune in India greater than Palk or Stringer Lawrence could ever have dreamt of.

In 1752 Robert Palk was appointed to the lucrative position of "Paymaster and Commissary in the Field" to Lawrence's army. In January 1754 Palk and Henry Vansittart were appointed to discuss the terms of a peace settlement with the French who controlled a large part of India. A year later a settlement was reached. A colleague of Palk's in Madras, Robert Orme, noted at that time that "Palk had long since given up studies of history and theology and had thrown himself into active engagement with the contemporary affairs of the British at Madras".

Palk was starting to amass a small fortune, mainly due to Stringer Lawrence putting lucrative deals in his direction, but the directors of the Company soon instructed Palk to confine himself to his religious duties. This did not sit well with Palk and he returned to England. He renounced his clerical vows and on 7 February 1761 married Anne Vansittart, the sister of Henry Vansittart, his wealthy and well-respected colleague in India, whose family home was Shottesbrooke Park in Berkshire.

While back in England, the East India Company was experiencing various trading difficulties in India. At the Company's London Headquarters during discussions concerning who might be able to resolve the problem, one of the members declared: "Gentlemen, you forget, we have Palk at home". With one voice the members replied "The very man!" Thus Robert Palk returned to India in October 1761 and was invited to serve on the Council of the Company. He was appointed to membership of the Treasury Committee and also served as the Export Warehouse Keeper.

When George Pigot resigned in November 1763, it made way for Palk to take up the post of Governor of Madras. With his new-found authority Palk entered more deeply into the world of trade, all the time enlarging his personal wealth.

Palk eventually left India in January 1767 at the age of 50, and was well received by both King George III and the Court of Directors on his return. Returning to England was not however the end of his involvement with India. He provided introductions and was patron to many who, like himself, went to India with the intention of making themselves a fortune.

His nephew Jonathan Palk said of his uncle Robert:

"Rectitude of mind and benignity of heart formed the outline of his character. Uncorrupted by the luxury of the East, he was an encourager of bodily and mental exertion, furnishing his friends with the means not of idleness, but of being active for their own good and the good of society. My father was a little farmer with a large family; for him my uncle bought an estate, which enabled him to live a credit to his mother, and respected by his neighbours".

== Election to Parliament ==
Robert Palk served as MP for Ashburton in 1767 for Wareham, between 1768 and 1774 (due to the influence of Calcraft, at the time Secretary for War) and again for Ashburton between 1774 and 1787. His brother Walter Palk also served as MP for Ashburton. Despite living in Torquay and then at Haldon House near Exeter, he continued his involvement with the parish of Ashburton, where he owned land and supplied the parish church with a new organ.

Robert Palk took a great interest in political matters, especially in matters concerning India and the British East India Company and mainly supported the government. Palk was a Tory in sentiment but resented Lord North's Regulating Act 1773, for the regulation of the East India Company.

The Warren Hastings Correspondence in the British Museum contains many letters written by Robert Palk to Warren Hastings between 1767 and 1782. Hastings was the first Governor General of India and often wrote to Palk back in England. Some of the letters in the Palk Manuscripts are written by Hastings asking favours of Sir Robert. Diamonds were a key method of sending large sums of money back to England and one letter concerning these is dated March 1770, as follows:

Fort St. George. Dear Sir, I must trouble you again to desire that you will not sell the diamonds by an advance on the invoice price, which I understand is the usual method, because they are, I am assured, of a superior quality to most sent to England by this ship. You will be pleased therefore to open the bulses, and rate them by their quality when you dispose of them. I am, dear Sir, your most obedient servant, Warren Hastings.

== Baronetcy ==
On 14 November 1760 "Robert Palk of Headborough" received a grant of arms as follows: Sable, an eagle displayed argent beaked and legged or a bordure engrailed of the second with crest: On a semi-terrestrial globe of the northern hemisphere proper an eagle rising as in the arms with supporters: Two Asian Indians in loincloths and turbans. His motto was: Deo Ducente ("With God Guiding"). He was made a baronet on 19 June 1782 by King George III, in recognition of his efforts in securing India for Britain. He was then admitted by the Mayor of Exeter as a Freeman of the City of Exeter, a privilege his son and successive heirs retained until 1883.

== Landholdings ==
Tor Mohun. Palk had intended to build a mansion at Torwood in his manor of Tor Mohun, which he had purchased from Lord Donegal in about 1759, but where he had been unable to purchase various surrounding fields which interfered with the estate. The Torwood estate was later developed by his successors into half of the resort of Torquay.

== Marriage and children ==
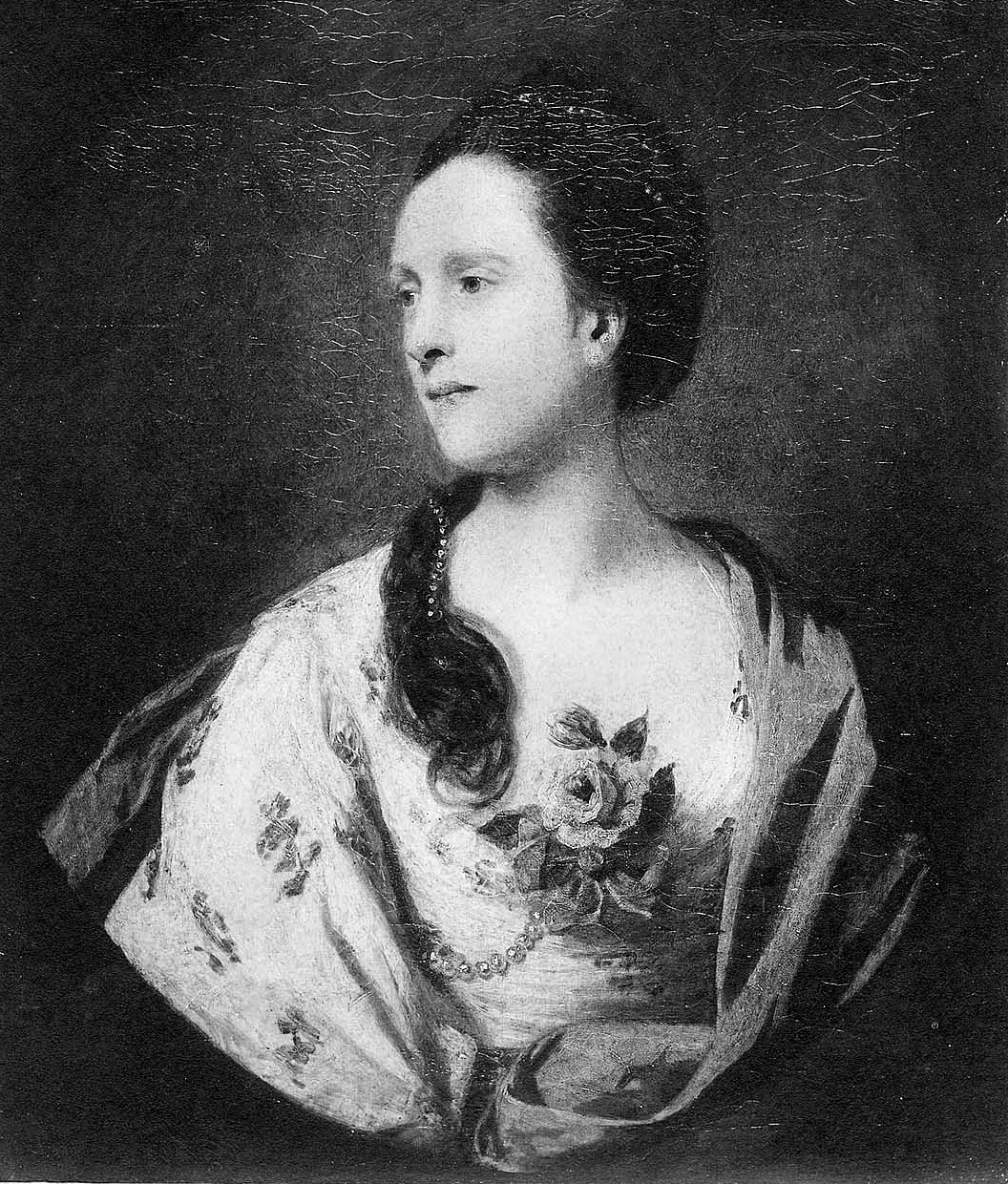
Anne Vansittart, Lady Palk (died 1788). Portrait by Sir Joshua Reynolds.

On 7 February 1761 he married Anne Vansittart (died 1788), daughter of Arthur van Sittart (1691–1760) by his wife Martha Stonhouse, daughter of Sir John Stonhouse, 3rd Baronet and sister of Henry Vansittart (1732–1770), of Shottesbrooke Park in Berkshire, Governor of Bengal from 1759 to 1764, his wealthy and well-respected colleague in India. She died in 1788, predeceasing her husband by 20 years. By his wife he had one son and three daughters as follows:

- Sir Lawrence Palk, 2nd Baronet (c. 1766 – 1813), son and heir, whose godfather was General Stringer Lawrence. All future male heirs were named "Lawrence" in honour of the General. His descendant Sir Lawrence Palk, 4th Baronet (1818–1883) was created Baron Haldon in 1880.
- Anne Palk (1764–1791), who in 1786 married Sir Bourchier Wrey, 7th Baronet, of Tawstock Court in Devon, and died at the age of 27, leaving three infant children. Her mural monument survives in Tawstock Church inscribed as follows:

"Sacred to the Memory of Anne, The Lady of Sir Bourchier Wrey Baronet, and daughter of Sir Robert Palk Baronet, of Haldon House in this County, who died the 5th day of September 1791, Aged 27 Years, leaving three infant children. Her Heart was pure and her manners unaffected. Her constant study was to know her Duty, and her greatest pleasure to discharge it. An affectionate Wife, a tender Parent, gentle, friendly, and benevolent. Taken from the World in the Prime of Years by a severe and lingering illness, She submitted to the will of Heaven with patient Resignation. Learn from her example that Virtue Is the loveliest ornament of Beauty!"

- Catherine Palk, died young;
- Emelia Palk, died young;

== Death and burial ==
Palk died at Haldon House on 29 April 1798, ten years after his wife. They were both buried in Dunchideock church.

== Name tributes ==
Palk Bay and the stretch of sea between India and Sri Lanka, The Palk Straits, were named after Robert Palk. The Palk Arms public house in the village of Hennock in Devon is named after him. Various places in Torquay are named after his family, including "Palk Street", Tormohun, Torquay.

Political offices
Preceded by George Pigot	Governor of Madras; 1763–1767	Succeeded by Charles Bourchier
Parliament of Great Britain
Preceded by John Harris; Thomas Walpole	Member of Parliament for Ashburton; 1767–1768; With: Thomas Walpole	Succeeded by Laurence Sulivan; Charles Boone
Preceded by John Pitt; Thomas Erle Drax	Member of Parliament for Wareham; 1768–1774; With: Ralph Burton March–November 1768; Whitshed Keene 1768 – January 1774; Thomas de Grey January–October 1774	Succeeded by Christopher D'Oyly; William Gerard Hamilton
Preceded by Laurence Sulivan; Charles Boone	Member of Parliament for Ashburton; 1774–1787; With: Charles Boone to 1784; Robert Mackreth from 1784	Succeeded by Lawrence Palk; Robert Mackreth
Baronetage of Great Britain
New creation	Baronet (of Haldon House); 1782–1798	Succeeded by Lawrence Palk
