= Ashburton Town Hall =

Municipal building in Ashburton, Devon, England

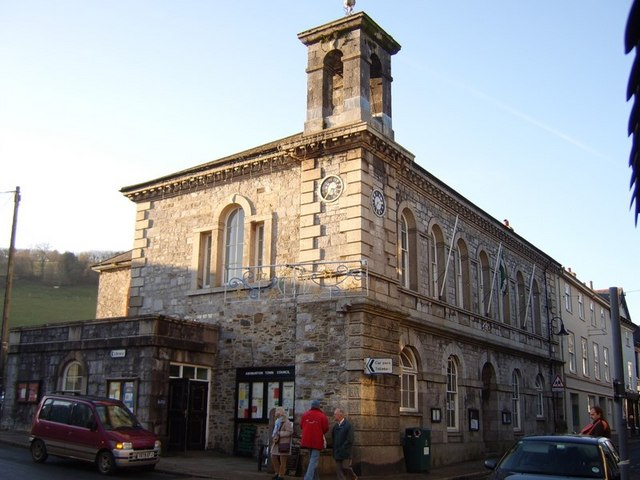
- Ashburton Town Hall

- Shown in Devon
- 50.5159°N 3.7571°W
- Location: North Street, Ashburton

History
- Built: 1850

Site notes
- Architect: Alfred Norman
- Architectural style: Italianate style

Listed Building – Grade II
- Official name: Town Hall
- Designated: 10 May 1973
- Reference no.: 1201012

Ashburton Town Hall is a municipal building in the North Street, Ashburton, Devon, England. The town hall, which is the meeting place of Ashburton Town Council, is a Grade II listed building.

== History ==
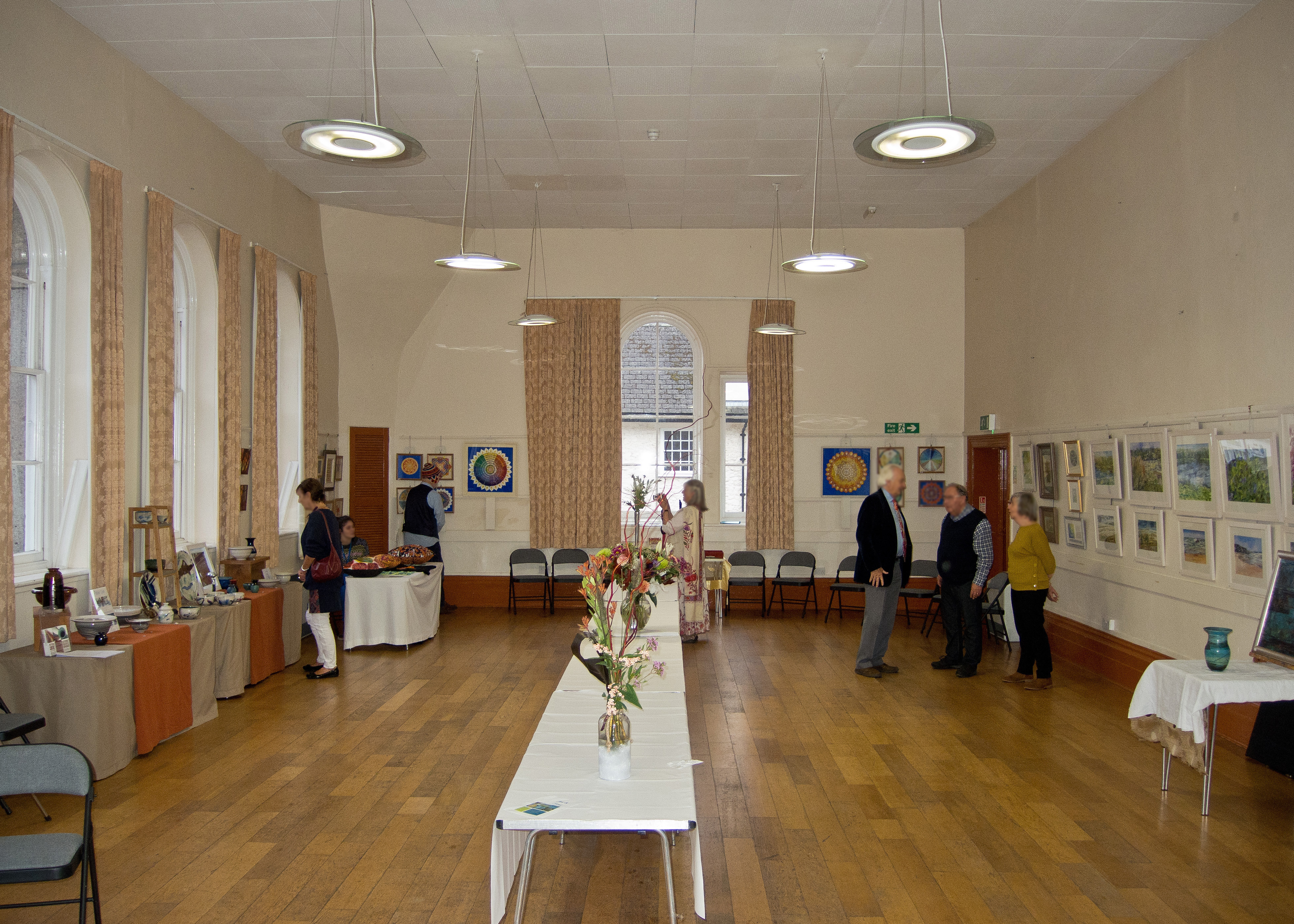
The main hall

The first municipal building in the town was a timber-framed market hall which stood at the Bull Ring and was completed in the mid-16th century. By 1848, the old market hall had become very dilapidated and the local lord of the manor, Charles Trefusis, 19th Baron Clinton of Heanton Satchville, offered to replace it with a more substantial structure.

The new building was designed by Alfred Norman of Devonport in the Italianate style, built in limestone rubble masonry and was completed in 1850. The design involved a symmetrical main frontage with five bays facing onto North Street; the central bay featured a round headed doorway with a keystone and a wrought-iron grill; the outer bays on the ground floor were fenestrated by round headed windows and the first floor was fenestrated by a row of seven round headed windows. Between the two floors, there was a prominent stringcourse containing a carved coat of arms of the Clinton family in the central bay. There was a three-stage tower surmounted by a prominent bell turret at the southeast corner of the building and, at roof level, there was a modillioned cornice. Internally, the principal room was the main hall on the first floor.

A clock mechanism with illuminated faces was manufactured by J. W. Benson of Ludgate Hill and installed in the second stage of the tower in 1871. Charles Hepburn-Stuart-Forbes-Trefusis, 21st Baron Clinton attempted to sell the town hall as part of an effort to rationalise his estate in 1905, but he withdrew the property from sale after it failed to achieve its reserve price. However, a local solicitor, Henry Mallaby Firth, acquired ownership of the market hall as well as the lordship of Ashburton in 1915 and a licence was granted for silent films to be shown in the main hall in 1919. It was also used as a venue for petty session hearings and for winter concerts.

Following Firth's death in 1926, the building was again put up for sale and was acquired by Ashburton Urban District Council in May 1927. The building became the headquarters of the council and remained the local seat of government until the enlarged Teignbridge District Council was formed at Newton Abbot in 1974. It subsequently became the meeting place and offices of Ashburton Town Council; it also accommodated the office of the portreeve, whose role was to preside over the local courts, and continued to function as an events venue with the annual Blues Festival being held there. An extensive programme of refurbishment and redecoration works was completed in May 2009.
