= Chudleigh Abbey =

Former abbey in Devon, England

Coordinates: 50.6109°N 3.5998°W

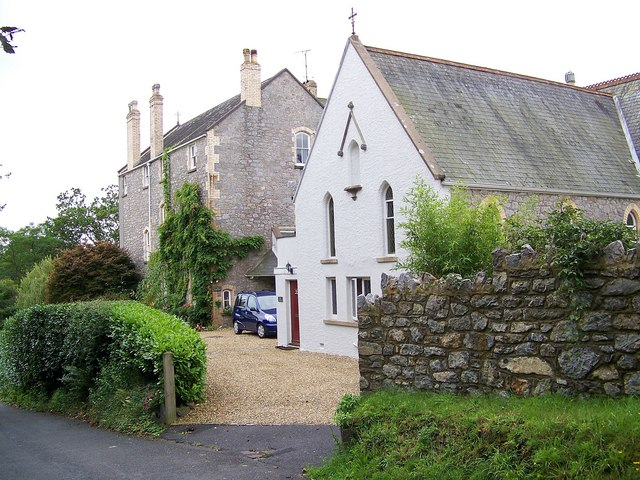
The former nunnery

Chudleigh Abbey was an abbey in Chudleigh, Devon, England.

St Bridget's Abbey of Syon had existed since 1415, returning to Spetisbury in Dorset in 1861 after 300 years and in Flanders and Portugal following the dissolution of the monasteries. In 1887 their monastery was built in Chudleigh and they occupied it until 1925 when they moved to Marley House, Rattery (Devon).

The building was then converted into 6 residences.
