= Baron Haldon =

Title in the Peerage of the United Kingdom

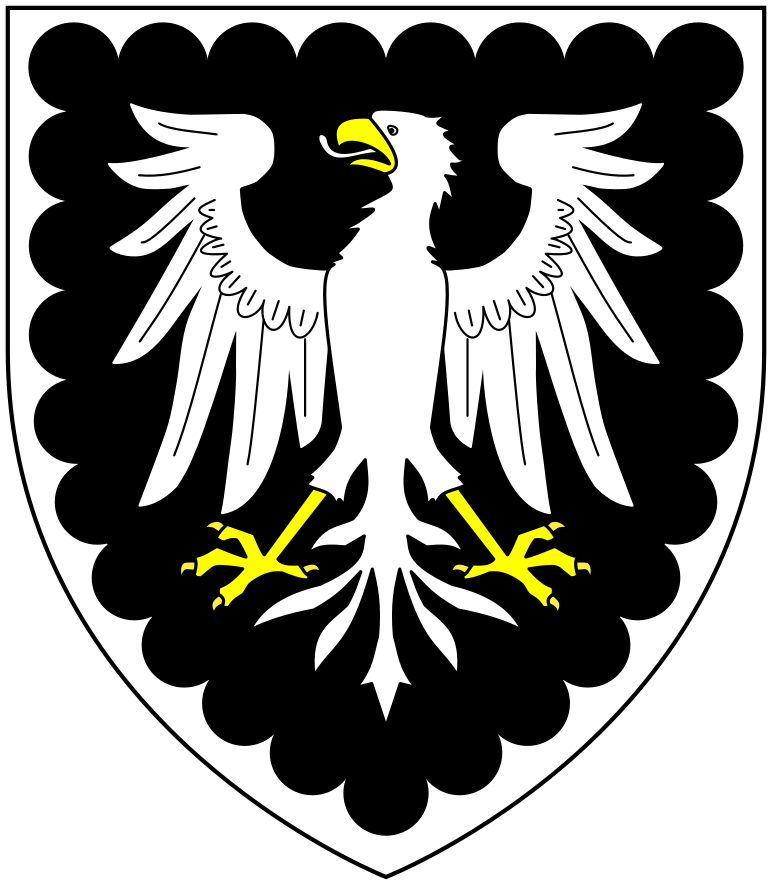
Arms of Palk: Sable, an eagle displayed argent beaked and legged or a bordure engrailed of the second

Baron Haldon, of Haldon, in the County of Devon, was a title created in the Peerage of the United Kingdom on 29 May 1880, for Sir Lawrence Palk, 4th Baronet and became extinct upon the death of the fifth baron in 1939. Haldon House was the family seat.

== Palk baronets, of Haldon House, Devon (1782) ==
- Sir Robert Palk, 1st Baronet (1717–1798)
- Sir Lawrence Palk, 2nd Baronet (c. 1766–1813)
- Sir Lawrence Vaughan Palk, 3rd Baronet (1793–1860)
- Sir Lawrence Palk, 4th Baronet (1818–1883) (created Baron Haldon in 1880)

== Barons Haldon (1880–1939) ==
- Lawrence Palk, 1st Baron Haldon (1818–1883)
- Lawrence Hesketh Palk, 2nd Baron Haldon (1846–1903)
- Lawrence William Palk, 3rd Baron Haldon (1869–1933)
- Lawrence Edward Broomfield Palk, 4th Baron Haldon (1896–1938)
- Edward Arthur Palk, 5th Baron Haldon (1854–1939)

== Palk baronets, of Haldon House, Devon (1782), continued ==
- Sir Wilmot Lawrence Launcelot Palk, 9th Baronet (1876–1945)

Baronetage of Great Britain
Preceded by Drake baronets	Palk baronets of Haldon House; 19 June 1782	Succeeded by Affleck baronets
