= Yasmin David =

British landscape painter

Yasmin David

Yasmin David (1939–2009) was a British landscape painter. She was the daughter of Lorna Garman Wishart and Laurie Lee. Many of her works were only exhibited posthumously. Since her death, her daughter, documentary filmmaker Clio David, discovered over 200 unseen paintings and drawings at the family home in Devon, leading to a solo exhibition of her work at The New Art Gallery Walsall in the summer of 2021. Yasmin's work in this gallery explores the beauty of the Devon landscape near Dartmoor.

She lived in Luscombe in Devon for most of her life. She also lived in Sicily and Cape Town, until her death in 2009.

Her half-brother Michael Wishart was also a painter.

She was married to Jungian psychologist, Julian David, and they had three children.
