= Enthuse (company) =

Enthuse (formerly CharityCheckout and Primo Events) is a tech for good company that provides donations, fundraising and event registration technology to charities. The company was formed in 2009 and the company’s headquarters are situated in London.

== Overview ==
Enthuse provides charities with payment processing facilities, online fundraising tools, event registration and ticketing. It also processes Gift Aid on behalf of its charity clients.

== History ==
The company was founded by Chester Mojay-Sinclare in 2009, and its flagship online fundraising service Charity Checkout was launched in 2012. Mojay-Sinclare was still a student when the company was launched.

In 2012, the company secured an undisclosed investment and began expansion across the UK. The company has raised £7.3m in investment in three separate funding rounds.

In 2022, Enthuse was chosen as the London Marathon's official fundraising partner, replacing Virgin Money Giving.

== Clients ==
Enthuse reports to have raised millions for charity and has thousands of charity and event registration clients, including Macmillan Cancer Support, NSPCC, WWF, The Royal British Legion, and London Marathon Events.

== Fees ==
Enthuse has 0% platform fees & payment processing fees of 1.9% + 30p. It offers automatic Gift Aid collection on charities' behalf for a 5% fee.

== Awards ==
- 100 top-rated employers, Tech Culture Champions
- UK's 50 fastest-growing start-ups, Silicon Valley Comes to the UK
- Partnership of the Year, Charity Today Awards
- Most Committed Company to the Sector, National Fundraising Award
