= Syon Abbey =

Dual monastery of men and women of the Bridgettine Order

Coordinates: 51°28′36.2″N 0°18′42.7″W

Engraving of original seal of the Abbess and Convent of Syon, Isleworth. Seated above is the Virgin Mary, holding the infant Jesus in her right arm. In her left hand she holds a stem of lily, her attribute denoting purity. Below is the founder of Syon Monastery, King Henry V, who kneels praying to the Virgin and Christ above, by the intercession of St Bridget, standing behind. The royal arms of England appear on the right with the cross of St George, patron of England, on the left, apparently with a lily between each arm. The legend around the perimeter is: "S(igillum) commune monasterii Sc'i (sancti) Salvatoris de Syon london' dioc'...."(common seal of the monastery of the Holy Saviour of Syon in the diocese of London). Dated between 1415 (founding) and 1422 (death of Henry V). Printed in Aungier's History of Syon Monastery, London, 1840

Syon Abbey /ˈsaɪən/, also called simply Syon, was a dual monastery of men and women of the Bridgettine Order, although it only ever had abbesses during its existence. It was founded in 1415 and stood, until its demolition in the 16th century, on the left (northern) bank of the River Thames within the parish of Isleworth, in the county of Middlesex, on or near the site of the present Georgian mansion of Syon House, today in the London Borough of Hounslow. It was named after the biblical "City of David which is Zion" (1 Kings 8:1).

At the time of the dissolution, the abbey was the wealthiest religious house in England. Syon Abbey maintained a substantial library, with a collection for the monks and another for the nuns. Religious texts were also copied and produced at Syon Abbey. One of these texts was A ryght profytable treatise, which was written by Syon librarian Thomas Betson. When Catherine of Siena's Dialogue of Divine Revelation was translated into English for the abbey, it was given a new title, The Orchard of Syon, and included a separate prologue written to the nuns.

== Background ==
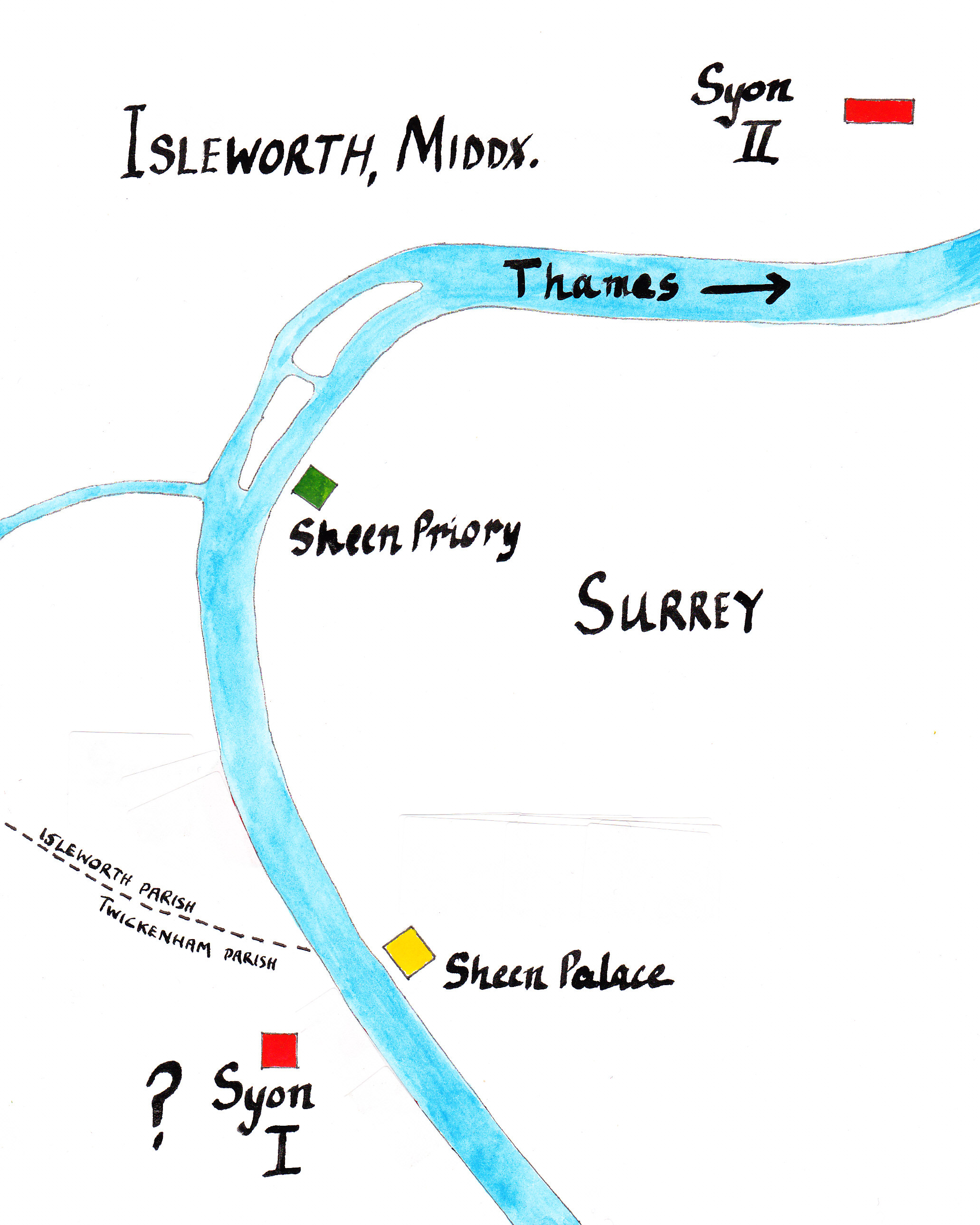
Map of The King's Great Work of Henry V, centred on the rebuilding of Sheen Palace. Note the dotted black line denoting the boundary of Twickenham Parish, within which Syon I was situated

Syon Abbey was built as part of King Henry V's "The King's Great Work" centred on Sheen Palace (renamed Richmond Palace in 1501). The royal manor of Sheen lay on the right (south), Surrey, bank of the River Thames, opposite the parish of Twickenham and the royal manor of Isleworth on the left, Middlesex, bank. Sheen had been a favourite residence of the last Plantagenet king Richard II (1377–1399) and his beloved wife Anne of Bohemia. When Anne died there of plague in 1394, Richard cursed the place where they had found great happiness and razed the palace to the ground. His throne was usurped by his cousin Henry Bolingbroke, Duke of Lancaster, who ruled as Henry IV (1399–1413). Henry was involved in the murder of Richard in 1400 and in that of Richard le Scrope, Archbishop of York, and made a vow to expiate his guilt by founding three monasteries but died before fulfilling his vow. The derelict palace was unfavoured by Henry IV but his son Henry V (1413–1422) saw its reconstruction as a means of emphasising the dynastic link between his own House of Lancaster and that of Plantagenet, of unquestioned legitimacy, and decided at the same time to found the three monasteries pledged by his father in one great, multi-campus building scheme, known as "The King's Great Work". This commenced in the winter of 1413–14, comprising a new Sheen Palace, and nearby the following three monasteries:

- A monastery of the Celestine Order. Established probably in Isleworth Manor. This monastery was of French monks, who refused to pray for Henry V following his warring with France, and was therefore dissolved by the King almost immediately after its foundation. This monastery probably occupied the site in Isleworth to which Syon Monastery moved in 1431.
- The House of Jesus of Bethlehem of Sheen, of the Order of Carthusians (1414) Sheen Priory. Built within Sheen Manor, to the north of the new palace.
- The Monastery of St Saviour and St Bridget of Syon, of the Order of St Augustine (1415), also called Syon Monastery. The first and original site of this monastery was probably almost due west of Sheen Palace, across the river, on the left bank of the Thames in Twickenham Parish.

== Foundation ==
The first stone of Syon Abbey was laid by King Henry V himself on 22 February 1415, in the presence of Richard Clifford, Bishop of London. It was not until 9 days later on 3 March 1415 that the King's founding charter was signed at Westminster. The exact location of this original plot is unknown, but it was certainly in the parish of Twickenham, the most northerly river frontage of which lies directly west across the Thames from Sheen Palace. Aungier states it is said to have been in the meadows which at the time of his publication in 1840 were the property of the Marquis of Ailsa, "formerly called Isleworth Park or Twickenham Park". The dimensions of the plot were specified in the charter, and seem to comprise a trapezoid, the longest side of which fronted the river:

... in a certain parcel of land of our demesne of our manor of Isleworth within the parish of Twickenham in the county of Middlesex, containing namely in length near the field towards Twickenham from a stone placed on the north side unto another stone placed on the south side 1938 ft. [591 m] and in breadth towards the south from that stone placed on the south side unto the water of Thames, 960 ft. [290 m] And in length by the bank of the Thames, from a stone likewise placed by the aforesaid bank at the north side to another like stone placed on the south side by the bank aforesaid, 2820 ft. [860 m] And in breadth from the north side from the aforesaid stone placed on the north side from the aforesaid stone placed on the north side unto the water of the Thames, 980 ft. [300 m]

== Nomenclature ==
The foundation charter states: "We will and decree that it shall be called 'The Monastery of St Saviour and St Bridget of Syon, of the Order of St Augustine' through all successive ages." (Monasterium in the original Latin.) This name was quoted slightly differently by the Abbess and Convent in their petition of 1431 as "The Monastery of St Saviour and the Saints Mary the Virgin and Bridget of Syon of the Order of St Augustine and of St Saviour". The funerary brass of Agnes Jordan, Syon's last pre-reformation abbess, describes her as "Sometyme abbesse of the monasterye of Syon".

=== Biblical Sion ===
There are numerous references to Sion in the Latin Bible, called Zion in the English Authorised Version, almost all of which are in the Old Testament. Mount Zion was the citadel of Jerusalem, which David captured from the Jebusites c. 1000 BC, as is clear from II Samuel, 5:7: "David took the stronghold of Zion: the same is the city of David". It was there that David, second King of Israel, established the capital of his kingdom of Israel, and upon which citadel it was that his son Solomon built the Temple, in which he was the dwelling place of God (II Samuel 7:6). It is thus the holiest site of Judaism and highly revered by Christians. Psalm 87:2 states "The Lord loveth the gates of Zion"; Joel 3:17 states "I am the Lord your God dwelling in Zion my holy mountain". The Romans razed the Jewish Temple to the ground in 70 AD and following the rise of Islam from 622, and the Muslim capture of the Holy Land in 636, the Muslims built on Mount Zion their Muslim shrine, the Dome of the Rock, which still stands today. The Crusaders recaptured Jerusalem for the Christians in 1099 and the Knights Templar built a round church near the site of the old Jewish Temple. Following the Muslim recapture of Jerusalem a century later, the site has been unavailable for formal Jewish or Christian prayer.

== Order ==
The Vision of St Bridget, detail of initial letter miniature, dated 1530, probably made at Syon. The document is a conveyance of lands bequeathed to Sheen Priory by the will of Hugh Denys(d.1511) to Syon (BL Harley MS 4640, f.15)

The monastery was founded "of the order of St Augustine, called St Saviour ... according to the regular institutes (i.e. regulations/rule) of the religious order by the aforesaid Bridget of Heaven inspired, founded and instituted". The charter previously stated the foundation to be "Especially in honour of the most holy St Bridget, who as is acknowledged by sufficient evidence, by divine inspiration founded a religious order under her name and obtained from Heaven that in whatsoever kingdom a monastery of the same religious order should be founded there peace and tranquility by the mediation of the same, should be perpetually established". St Bridget was a visionary, and is supposed to have seen the Risen Christ, displaying his wounds. The Bridgettine order was a modified order of St Augustine, with particular devotions to the Passion of Christ and the honour of the Virgin Mary. The Bridgettines had first been brought to England from Wastein (Vadstena Abbey) in Sweden by Henry Lord FitzHugh, who suggested to Henry V that he should grant the order one of his planned three new monastic foundations. The Bridgettine nuns sent by Abbess Gerdeka Hartlevsdotter from the mother house Vadstena Abbey in Sweden to England were Anna Karlsdotter, Christina Finwitsdotter, Christina Esbjörnsdotter and Anna Esbjörnsdotter.

== Personnel ==
The king's original foundation followed Bridget's rule and consisted of 85 persons. The full complement was as follows:

Women (60):

- 1 abbess
- 59 nuns

Men (25):

- 1 confessor general
- 12 priests
- 4 deacons
- 8 lay brethren

The different sexes were "to dwell in separate habitations, to wit the said abbess and sisters within one court by themselves and the said confessor and brothers in a separate court by themselves, within the same monastery". The legal corporate entity was "The Abbess and Convent" which could transact business by affixing its single corporate seal. The Convent (from Latin convenio, to come together) consisted of the Abbess and nuns together with the Confessor and all the religious men. Clearly the Abbess was the overall presiding officer.

== Abbesses ==
Only eight abbesses were ever elected.

- Matilda Newton 1418–1420 (titular abbess)
- Joan North 1420–1433 (elected abbess)
- Maud Muston 1433–1447
- Margaret Ashby 1448–1456
- Elizabeth Muston 1456–1497
- Elizabeth Gibbs 1497–1518
- Constance Browne 1518–1520
- Agnes Jordan 1520–1539 (d. 29 January 1546)

== Burials ==
- Thomas Stanley, 2nd Earl of Derby
- Richard Sutton (lawyer)
- William Stanley (Battle of Bosworth)

== Expansion and relocation ==
Sometime before 1431 the Abbess and Convent received permission by letters patent from King Henry VI (1422–1461), the son of the founder and who was particularly favourable to Syon, having made it several grants and confirmations in rapid succession, to move the monastery to a new site of their own choosing some mile and a half downstream to a riverbank site within Isleworth parish. The land in question had been in the monastery's ownership since 1422, in which last year of the life of Henry V had by an act of Parliament separated the manor of Isleworth from the Duchy of Cornwall and given it to Syon. The reason for the move was to gain more space, as is made clear from the letters patent:

The said Abbess and Convent had presented their humble petition setting forth that their aforesaid monastery was so small and confined in its dimensions that the numerous persons therein ... were not only incommodiously but dangerously situated ... that in consequence thereof the said abbess and convent had chosen out a spot in the neighbourhood of their said priory within the said lordship of Isleworth, more meet healthful and salubrious for them to inhabit.

The danger of the situation referred to may have been due to proximity to the river, or possibly even spiritual danger to the inmates due to a too close intermingling of the sexes.

== New building ==
Monastery of Syon Act 1503
- Act of Parliament
- Parliament of England
- Long title: Pro Monastio Sci Salvatoris de Syon.
- Citation: 19 Hen. 7. c. 29
- Territorial extent: England and Wales

Dates
- Royal assent: 25 January 1504 (Note: Start of session.)
- Commencement: 25 January 1504
- Repealed: 31 July 1978
Other legislation
Repealed by	Statute Law (Repeals) Act 1978

Status: Repealed

Text of statute as originally enacted

The letters patent authorising the move, which were ratified by a grant by the king dated 1431, make clear that some of the new buildings had already been started and indeed completed:

The Abbess and convent ...had begun and with great cost completed the erection of a certain edifice more spacious and convenient as well for the habitation of themselves as of the said religious brethren, which monastery so built anew and enlarged they have earnestly requested licence of us ... to consecrate and set apart as a habitation for them the said abbess and nuns and men of religion ... Know ye we therefore of our pity have ... permitted them ... to the said mansion so chosen and by the said abbess and convent erected edified built and enlarged as aforesaid ... to remove immediately ...

It seems that this building, apparently living quarters or “mansion” must have been started several years before 1431 to have been described as “completed” in the letters of patent issued before 1431

There was however another building, possibly the new Church-building itself, which still had not been completed 11 years later, by 1442, when Henry VI issued further letters patent granting the Abbess and Convent special privileges for the transport of building materials from the king's warren in the royal manor of Sheen across the river to Isleworth:

That none of the masons, carpenters and tilers or any of their workmen or any of their materials to be employed towards the construction of the new Monastery of Syon, should be taken away by any his officers against their will.

The new site of the church building itself is now believed, after recent archaeological work, to lie partly underneath and to the east of the present Georgian mansion of Syon House (see § Archaeological excavations below).

=== Dissolution ===
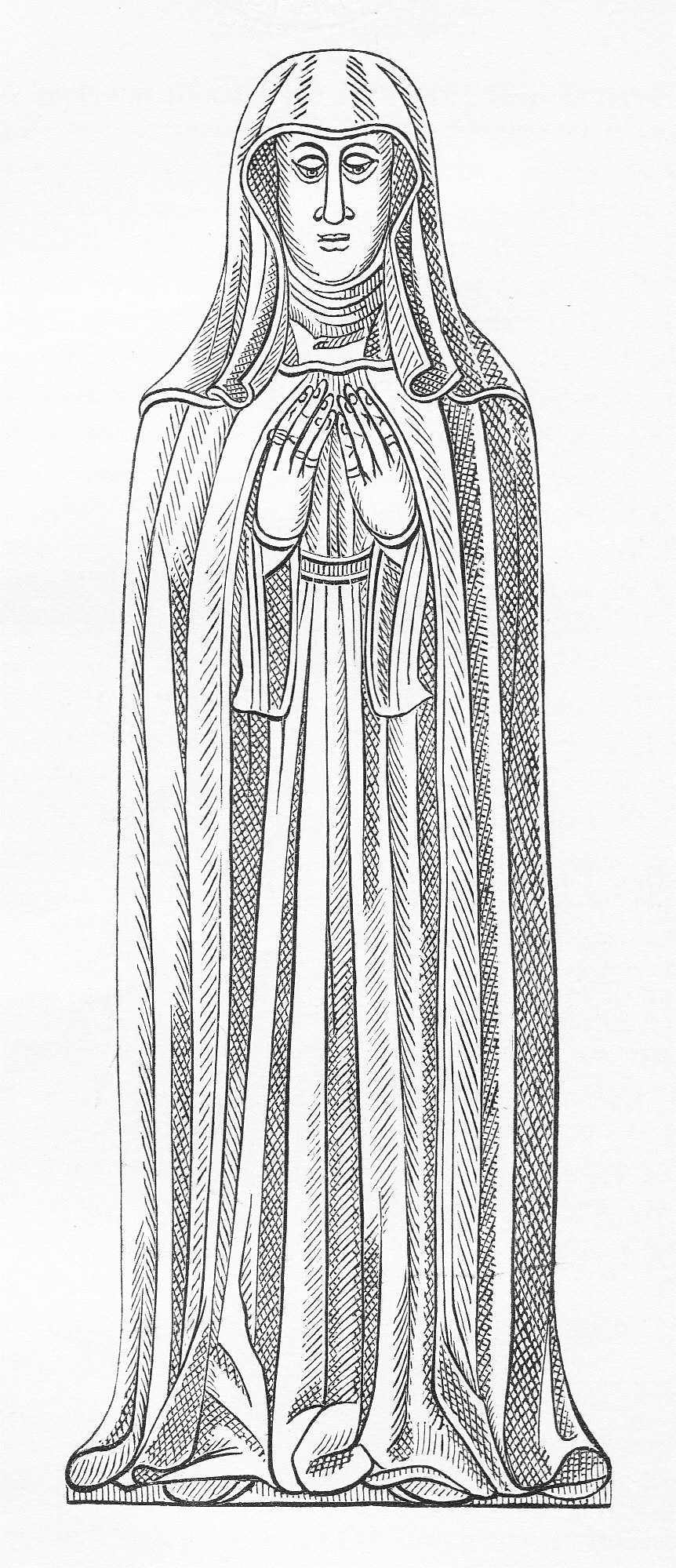
Funerary brass of Dame Agnes Jordan, last pre-Reformation Abbess of Syon Monastery, died 29 January 1546. St Mary's Church, Denham, Buckinghamshire

Following Henry VIII's decision in 1534 to break with Rome, many of the residents of Syon expressed themselves favourable to Henry's supremacy over the English Church, and even converted recalcitrant monks from other monasteries to do likewise. Many, however, refused to acknowledge the King's new title.

Due to the actions of one Syon monk named Richard Reynolds, an eminent doctor in divinity later canonised, the King made Syon an object of special vengeance. Reynolds had facilitated a meeting at Syon between Sir Thomas More, the King's chief opponent in his assumption of Supreme Headship, and Elizabeth Barton, the mystic "Holy Maid of Kent" at which More was fueled with supposed divine revelations further supporting his opposition. Thomas Cromwell, the king's minister in effecting the Dissolution, had visited Syon in person to obtain expressions of acceptance of supremacy, but seems to have met an antagonistic reception from one of the monks at the front-door grate. He left two of his agents, Thomas Bedyll and Master Leightone, to obtain the required acceptances from the nuns and monks of the King's new status.

Bedyll reported that "the bretherne stand stif in thaire obstinacy as you left thaim". Two were sent to the Bishop of London, within whose diocese Syon lay, apparently for a course of conversion, whilst two Church of England clerics were brought in to convert another two Syon monks who were particularly obstinate, Whitford and Little. On the following day the King himself sent four different Church of England clerics to Syon for the same purpose, again without success. The agent Bedyll then took the recalcitrant Whitford for a walk in the monastery garden to further persuade him "both with faire wordes and with foule" to convert. He then resorted to what appears a classic use of blackmail, accusing Whitford of having "used bawdy wordes to diverse ladys at the tymes of thaire confession", which would bring him "to the greate shame of the world". Still he did not convert, having "a brasyn forehead which shameth at no thing". Whitford and Little were also reported, whilst hearing confessions through a hole in the wall, of persons external to the monastery, to have denounced the king's new title as Supreme Head and his divorce and remarriage, for which reason it was proposed to Cromwell that the confessional grille be bricked up.

The nuns were more easily won over, however, and were sat down together in the chapter house of Syon in the presence of the Bishop of London and their own male confessor. All who accepted the king's new title were asked to remain seated, whilst those opposed were asked to leave the chamber. All remained seated, signifying their acceptance, no doubt reluctantly. The nuns thereupon in resignation to their new status sent a special request to Cromwell that he should "be a good maister unto thaim and to thaire house, as thaire special trust is in you". It seems they were then confident in the continuation of their monastery. One nun, however, named Agnes Smythe, "a sturdy dame and a wylful", made a show of some resistance in persuading her sister nuns not to hand over the convent seal, which had been required by Cromwell's agents to seal a declaration of conversion to be signed by the abbess and nuns.

On 4 May 1535 Reynolds was hanged, drawn and quartered at Tyburn for denying the king's supremacy, which martyrdom gained him his canonisation from Rome. The monastery finally surrendered to the king's commissioners in 1539 and the community was expelled. The annual net revenues were then reported to be £1,731. A very large pension of £200 was given to the abbess Agnes Jordan and one of £6 each to the junior nuns. The male Confessor-General received a pension of £15, the junior monks receiving £6 to £8 each.

== Peregrination ==
How the Syon nuns moved from Syon and in time back to England
The peregrination

The expelled community, unlike many others, did not disband and separate, but exiled itself to the Netherlands. These nuns, including Elizabeth Sander and Katherine Palmer, would visit England on missions. The community were recalled briefly to Syon following the accession of the Catholic Queen Mary I (1553–1558) in 1553 when the Abbey was reestablished by a charted issued on 1 March 1557 by Cardinal Pole. Katherine Palmer was elected abbess on 31 July 1557, supported by Queen Mary. The buildings had remained intact during the interval. On the accession of the Protestant Queen Elizabeth I (1558–1603) in 1558 the Religious Houses Act 1558 (1 Eliz. 1. c. 24) was passed annexing and re-dissolving certain religious houses, including Syon, whereupon the nuns obtained royal licence to leave England, eventually settling in Lisbon, Portugal, where they arrived in 1594, after having experienced many troubles and afflictions in travels through France and Spain. While in Lisbon, they produced an illuminated petition to the King of Spain and his daughter asking for help returning to England. This petition, called the Arundel Manuscript, is now housed at Arundel Castle.

== Return to England ==
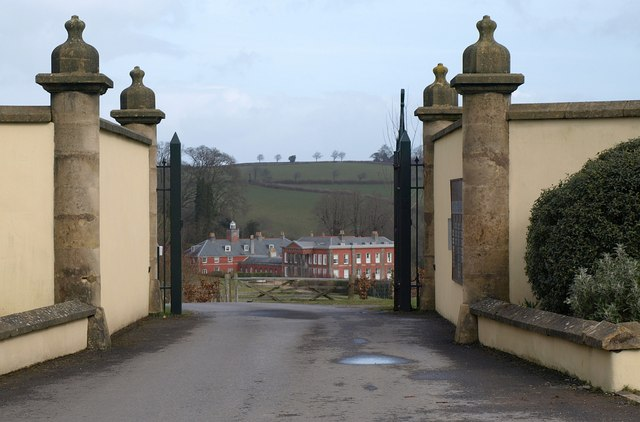
Marley House, a Georgian mansion built by Walter Palk (1742–1819), MP, in the parish of Rattery in Devon, renamed "Syon Abbey" in 1925 when the community took up residence

The Lisbon community returned to England in 1861, settling first in Spetisbury, Dorset; moving in 1887 to Chudleigh, Devon (in a building known as Chudleigh Abbey); and then in 1925 (or 1935) to Marley House, in the parish of Rattery, South Brent, Devon. The religious community, or Abbey, of Syon thus had the distinction of being the only English one that survived the Reformation unbroken. A large piece of sculptured stonework from the monastery's remains was returned to them ceremoniously by the Duke of Northumberland, owner of Syon House. In 2004, the remaining medieval books in the abbey's collection were deposited for safe-keeping with the University of Exeter Library. In 2011 Syon Abbey, by now reduced to three elderly sisters, was closed and sold. The remaining sisters now live in Plymouth.

== Resting place for coffin of Henry VIII ==
On 14 February 1547 the coffin of King Henry VIII lay overnight at Syon, en route from Westminster for burial in St George's Chapel, Windsor. Twelve years before in 1535 a Franciscan friar named William Peyto (or Peto, Petow; d.1558 or 1559), had preached before the king at Greenwich Palace "that God's judgements were ready to fall upon his head and that dogs would lick his blood, as they had done to Ahab", whose infamy rests upon 1 Kings 16:33: "And Ahab did more to provoke the Lord God of Israel to anger than all the kings of Israel that were before him". The prophecy was said to have been fulfilled during this night at Syon, when some "corrupted matter of a bloody colour" fell from the coffin to the floor.

Syon Abbey was also home to Katherine Howard, fifth wife of Henry VIII, from November 1541 to February 1542, when she was executed.

== Replacement by mansion of Syon House ==
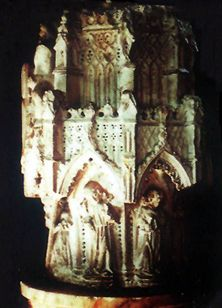
Remnant of 15th-century Gothic sculpted stone from Syon Monastery found at Syon House

After dissolution, the estate came into the possession of Edward Seymour, 1st Duke of Somerset, Lord Protector to the young Edward VI, who started work on building the first Syon House in the Italian Renaissance style, apparently incorporating the west end of the monastery church. Following the Duke's execution for treason in 1552, it was confiscated for the Crown under Queen Mary, who briefly re-established the community there during 1557 to 1558. Her successor Queen Elizabeth I granted in 1594 a lease of the manor to Henry Percy, 9th Earl of Northumberland on his marriage to Dorothy Devereux, the younger daughter of Walter Devereux, 1st Earl of Essex, who later received a grant of the freehold from King James I in 1604. The square house seen today is a Georgian remodelling of the first house by Hugh Percy, 1st Duke of Northumberland (1714–1786), in about 1760. The first Duke was born Hugh Smithson, and married Lady Elizabeth Seymour (daughter and heiress of Algernon Seymour, 7th Duke of Somerset (d.1750), a direct descendant of Protector Somerset), whose grandmother Lady Elizabeth Percy (d.1722) was the heiress of the 15th and last Percy, Earl of Northumberland, from whom Syon House thus devolved onto the first Duke of Northumberland. In 1750, 10 years after his marriage, he adopted the name Percy in lieu of his patronymic.

== Archaeological excavations ==
Syon House remains in 2010 the London seat of the Dukes of Northumberland. Foundations of the Monastery Church lying to the immediate east of Syon House were partially uncovered in excavations starting in summer 2003, made by Channel 4's Time Team archaeological programme, broadcast on 4 January 2004. The programme highlighted medieval masonry blocks in the foundation wall of the north Wing as evidence that the west end of the church may have been incorporated into the current house built by Protector Somerset. However, subsequent sweeping of the floor demonstrated that the Tudor floor surface continued underneath the wall, suggesting that the medieval blocks were simply reused when this wing was rebuilt in 1820. So far there is no evidence on the exact length of the church or whether it does actually extend under Syon House. Further excavations by Birkbeck, University of London continued from 2004 to 2011. Birkbeck excavations revealed that the church's design had more in common with the church at Vadstena Abbey than it did with contemporary English churches. Using knowledge of Vadstena Abbey, Birkbeck archeologists also created hypotheses about the layout of Syon. Archeologists identified the possible location of the convent garden, which they believe may have been near the convent infirmary. As of 2020, it has been confirmed that some portions of the abbey remained intact and were used in situ during the construction of Syon House, most notably an undercroft forming part of the cellars of the mansion's westerly wing and two Gothic doorways. Further remains are confirmed across the building's lawns, including the vaults of the abbey latrine and the foundations of the majority of the abbey church.

== Syon Abbey collection ==
A substantial collection of material relating to Syon Abbey is held at the University of Exeter Special Collections. A large proportion of this collection comprises material deposited by the sisters of Syon Abbey between 1990 and the monastery's closure in 2011, including the community's archive, manuscripts and printed books.

== Sources ==
- Aungier, George James. The History and Antiquities of Syon Monastery, the Parish of Isleworth and the Chapel of Hounslow; Compiled from Public Records, Ancient Manuscripts, Ecclesiastical and Other Authentic Documents. London, 1840.
- Cloake, John. Richmond Palace, its History and its Plan. London, 2001
