= Chester Mojay-Sinclare =

British entrepreneur

Chester Mojay-Sinclare (born c. 1989) is a British entrepreneur. He is the founder of tech for good company Enthuse, the donations, fundraising and event registration technology provider.

== Early life ==
Mojay-Sinclare was born in London and grew up in Ashburton in Devon, England. He was expelled from primary school at a young age, before moving on to secondary school at South Dartmoor Community College. He went on to read philosophy at University College London and founded Spudnik, an educational space project that involved a potato dressed as Father Christmas being sent 90,000 ft in a space capsule designed by Landscove Church of England Primary School children. In 2011, he fulfilled the final wishes of his late grandmother to have her ashes scattered into the stratosphere. Mojay-Sinclare represented the UK at the Global Student Entrepreneurship Awards in New York the same year. In 2018, he was named in Forbes 30 Under 30.

== Enthuse ==
Enthuse is a provider of donations, fundraising and event registration technology to charities and not-for-profit organisations.

The tech for good company was founded by Mojay-Sinclare in 2012 while he was a student at University College London; the university was one of the original investors in the company. Enthuse has raised £7.3m in investment in three separate funding rounds to date.

In 2022, Enthuse was chosen as the London Marathon's official fundraising partner, replacing Virgin Money Giving.

== House of Lords ==
In 2016 Mojay-Sinclare gave evidence to the House of Lords Select Committee on Charities, as an expert in digital technology and fundraising. During the evidence session, Mojay-Sinclare recommended introducing digital trustee roles in an effort to "bring a focus to digital" within the charity sector.

This suggestion became one of the key recommendations within the 'Stronger charities for a stronger society' report published by the House of Lords Select Committee on Charities.
