= South Dartmoor Community College =

Coordinates: 50.524°N 3.746°W

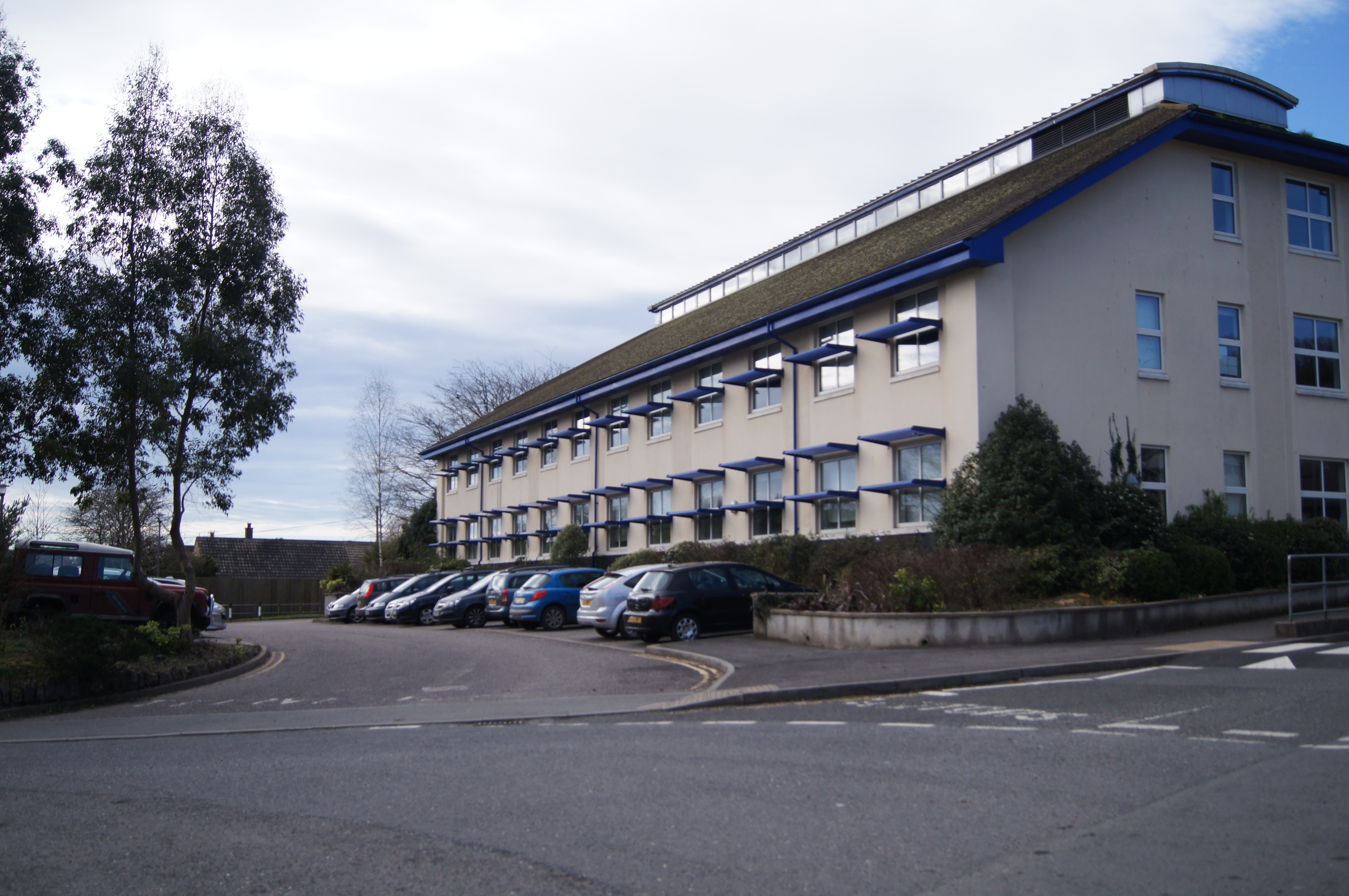

Location
- Balland Lane; Ashburton, Devon, TQ13 7EW; England

Information
- Type: Academy
- Motto: fides, probata, coronat
- Established: 1964
- Local authority: Devon
- Department for Education URN: 136569 Tables
- Ofsted: Reports
- Chairman of Governors: Dominic Course
- Principal: Jen Veal
- Gender: Coeducational
- Age: 11 to 18
- Enrolment: 1,650
- Website: http://www.southdartmoor.devon.sch.uk

South Dartmoor Community College (SDCC) is a co-educational academy school located in Ashburton, Devon, England. The number of students on roll is 1,650. The school has a sixth form centre and has become a Specialist Sports College with Training School Status that is strongly linked with Ashmoor Hockey Club.

== Trust and Academy status ==
From September 2007, South Dartmoor Community College became a Trust School. It is now part of the South Dartmoor Multi Academy Trust, along with: Ashburton Primary School, Atrium Studio School, Buckfastleigh Primary School, Glendinning House, Ilsington Church of England Primary School, Moretonhampstead Primary School, Widecombe-in-the-moor Primary School, The Ashmoor Sports Centre, and Ashmoor South Brent Fitness Centre.

On 1 April 2011, South Dartmoor Community College officially gained academy status.

In 2020 South Dartmoor Community College and Atrium Studio School joined The Westcountry Schools Trust (WeST).

== Notable alumni ==
- Matt Jay, English professional footballer
- Chester Mojay-Sinclare, British entrepreneur
- Jamie Reid, Northern Irish professional footballer
- Ollie Watkins, England International professional footballer
- Ben Flower, Canadian professional sailor
- Josh Widdicombe, English stand-up comedian
- Bryony Frost, British National Jockey
