= Lawrence Vaughan Palk =

British landowner and Member of Parliament

- Born: 24 April 1793; England
- Died: 16 May 1860 (aged 67); Exeter, Devon, England

Sir Lawrence Vaughan Palk, 3rd Baronet (24 April 1793 – 16 May 1860) of Haldon House in the parish of Kenn, near Exeter in Devon, was a landowner and Member of Parliament for Ashburton, Devon, from 1818 to 1831.

== Origins ==
He was born on 25 April 1793 the son of Sir Lawrence Palk, 2nd Baronet (c. 1766–1813) by his wife Dorothy, daughter of Wilmot Vaughan, 1st Earl of Lisburne.

== Haldon House ==
Haldon House was purchased by Sir Robert Palk, 1st Baronet (1717–1798) and was one of the "best" houses in Devon, built in the style of Buckingham House in London.

== Death and succession ==
He died at Haldon House on 16 May 1860 and was succeeded by his son Lawrence Palk, 1st Baron Haldon (1818–1883).

Baronetage of Great Britain
Preceded by Lawrence Palk	Baronet (of Haldon House); 1813–1860	Succeeded by Lawrence Palk
