= Ashburton, Devon =

Town in Devon, England

Coordinates: 50°30′55″N 3°45′18″W

Ashburton
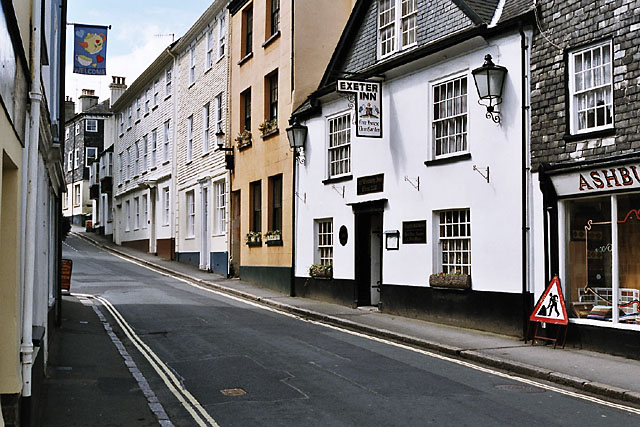
- West Street, Ashburton

- Location within Devon
- Population: 4,170
- OS grid reference: SX756698
- Civil parish: Ashburton
- District: Teignbridge
- Shire county: Devon
- Region: South West
- Country: England
- Sovereign state: United Kingdom
- Post town: NEWTON ABBOT
- Postcode district: TQ13
- Dialling code: 01364
- Police: Devon and Cornwall
- Fire: Devon and Somerset
- Ambulance: South Western
- UK Parliament: Central Devon

Ashburton is a town on the south-southeastern edge of Dartmoor in Devon, England, adjacent to the A38. The town is 20 miles (32 km) northeast of Plymouth and 17 miles (27 km) southwest of Exeter.

It was formerly important as a stannary town (a centre for the administration of tin mining) and remains the largest town in the national park. Ashburton has two pubs in the centre of town and six restaurants/cafés. The town is also part of the electoral ward named Ashburton and Buckfastleigh, the population of which at the 2011 census was 7,718.

== History ==
The name of the town derives from the Old English æsc-burna-tun meaning 'farm/settlement with a stream frequented by ash trees'.

The name is recorded in Domesday Book (1086) as Essebretone. Ashburton was then the main town of the Parish of Ashburton, in Teignbridge Hundred. In the late Middle Ages the guild of St Lawrence had effectively become the town council. During the English Civil War Ashburton was a temporary refuge for Royalist troops fleeing after their defeat by General Fairfax at nearby Bovey Tracey.

The population in the 1841 census was 3,841.

The town was the terminus of the Buckfastleigh, Totnes and South Devon Railway, which opened on 1 May 1872. Ashburton railway station closed to passengers in November 1958 although goods traffic on the line continued until 7 September 1962. Links to Buckfastleigh and Totnes are maintained by Country Bus route 88, which also serves Newton Abbot.

Ashburton used to be famous for a beverage known as Ashburton Pop, possibly a type of champagne, the recipe for which was lost with the death of the brewer in 1765.

Ashburton Carnival is one of the oldest, possibly the oldest, surviving in Devon. Written records date it back to 1891 but it is believed to have been started in the mid-1880s to raise funds for a new hospital.

Ashburton Golf Club was founded in 1910 and continued into the 1920s.

Ashmoor Hockey Club was formed in 2003 and plays at South Dartmoor Community College.

Ashburton Cookery School & Chefs Academy, to the north of the town, was founded in 1992.

== Politics ==
Ashburton was the first place to elect a candidate of the Official Monster Raving Loony Party to public office. The candidate was Alan Hope, a local publican, who was elected unopposed to Ashburton Town Council in 1989. He subsequently became deputy mayor and later mayor of Ashburton.

The town is one of a few still to appoint a portreeve or 'port warden’ annually. Others are Laugharne, Beccles, Callington (where the name is given to the council chairman) and Yeovil.

== Education ==
South Dartmoor Community College, a large secondary school for pupils aged 11-18, is located in Ashburton.

Sands School, England's second democratic school, is located in Ashburton.

== Sites of interest ==
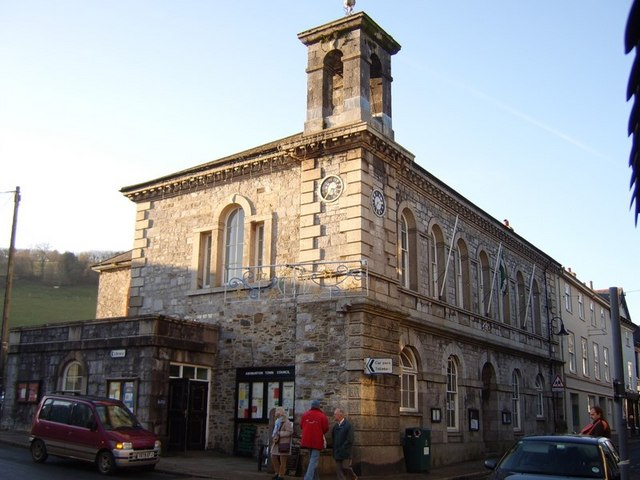
Ashburton Town Hall

The parish church of St Andrew is a fine 15th-century Grade One Building, with a tall tower and two aisles. The 15th-century church tower includes sculptures by Herbert Edmund Read (1885–1951), who also carved the oak reredos; (he is not the art historian Herbert Read). One window has stained glass designed by C. E. Kempe. The porch is partly Norman.

St Lawrence Chapel is a Grade II* Listed Building in St Lawrence Lane in the centre of the town. Originally a chantry chapel and then a grammar school for more than 600 years, St Lawrence Chapel is now an important heritage, cultural and community centre, managed by the Guild of St Lawrence.

The town's old Methodist Church (Grade II listed) at 15 West St was built in 1835. In 2015 the Methodist congregation moved to the nearby St Andrew's Church Hall. Their previous building was sold by public auction on 19 July 2017 to Ashburton Arts Ltd (a not-for-profit company limited by guarantee) using funds given or le t by members of the community. The building now houses Ashburton Arts Centre.

St Gudula's Well and Cross in Old Totnes Road is probably named after St Gulval, also honoured in the village of Gulval, in Cornwall.

Ashburton Town Hall was originally built as a market hall in 1850.

A life-size replica of an All Terrain Scout Transport was erected beside the A38 road to "raise awareness for Ashburton" in 2018, despite the council initially asking for its removal, planning permission which would secure the landmark's future for 10 years was granted in 2019.

== Climate ==
Climate data for Ashburton, 1981–2010 normals
Month	Jan	Feb	Mar	Apr	May	Jun	Jul	Aug	Sep	Oct	Nov	Dec	Year
Mean daily maximum °C (°F)	9 (48)	9 (48)	11 (52)	13 (55)	16 (61)	19 (66)	21 (70)	21 (70)	18 (64)	15 (59)	12 (54)	10 (50)	15 (58)
Mean daily minimum °C (°F)	4 (39)	4 (39)	5 (41)	6 (43)	8 (46)	11 (52)	13 (55)	13 (55)	11 (52)	9 (48)	6 (43)	5 (41)	8 (46)
Average precipitation mm (inches)	126.4 (4.98)	96.2 (3.79)	93.0 (3.66)	73.5 (2.89)	75.7 (2.98)	65.0 (2.56)	68.0 (2.68)	72.2 (2.84)	80.7 (3.18)	123.0 (4.84)	121.4 (4.78)	139.7 (5.50)	1,134.8 (44.68)
Source: Chelsa Climate

== Notable people ==
- Laurence Sulivan (1713–1786), politician, MP for Ashburton, 1768–1774
- Sir Robert Palk, 1st Baronet (1717–1798), politician and MP for Ashburton in 1767 and between 1774 and 1787.
- Sir Robert Mackreth (?1725–1819), club owner, money lender, speculator, politician and local MP, 1784 to 1802.
- John Dunning, 1st Baron Ashburton (1731–1783), lawyer and politician.
- John Swete (1752–1821), clergyman, landowner, artist, antiquary, historian and topographer
- William Gifford (1756–1826), critic, editor, poet, satirist and controversialist.
- John Ireland (1761–1842), Anglican priest and Dean of Westminster, 1816-1842, taught at the local grammar school.
- Richard Preston (1768–1850), legal author and politician, MP for Ashburton, 1812–18.
- John Copley, 1st Baron Lyndhurst (1772–1863), lawyer and politician, three times Lord Chancellor and local MP, 1818–1826.
- Alexander Baring, 1st Baron Ashburton (1774–1848), diplomat, financier, art collector and member of the Baring family.
- William Bickford (1774–1834), inventor of the safety fuse used in the mining industry
- Sir Henry Carew, 7th Baronet (1779–1830), member of the Devon heraldry, MP for Ashburton, 1796 to 1811
- William Howard Allen (1790–1822), United States naval officer, interned for 18 months in Ashburton
- Richard Carlile (1790–1843), radical publisher, writer and political agitator
- Thomas Glanville Taylor (1804–1848), astronomer, mainly worked at the Madras Observatory in India.
- Sir Robert Richard Torrens (1812–1884), parliamentarian, writer and land reformer, lived in Ashburton
- William John Wills (1834–1861), explorer, co-lead the Burke and Wills expedition, attended local St Andrew's Grammar School
- Charles Eamer Kempe (1837–1907), designer of the stained-glass windows in St Andrew's Church
- Sir Charles Tucker (1838–1935), British Army officer in India and South Africa.
- Sir Harry Eve (1856–1940), barrister, judge and politician, MP for Ashburton, 1904–1907
- Cecil Mallaby Firth (1878–1931), Egyptologist, set up the Aswan Museum in 1912, baptised in Ashburton
- Christopher Hutton (1893–1965) soldier, airman, journalist and inventor, worked for Special Operations Executive retired locally
- Stevie Smith (1902–1971), poet and novelist, died in Ashburton
- Athel Cornish-Bowden (born 1943), biochemist, worked on metabolic control analysis

=== Sport ===
- Edward Dowson (1880–1933), cricketer, played 113 First-class cricket games, died locally
- Jim McNichol (born 1958), a Scottish footballer who played 425 games including 126 games for Torquay United
- Ollie Watkins (born 1995), footballer, played over 420 games and 20 for England, educated at South Dartmoor Community College
