= Thomas Betson (merchant) =

- Born: England
- Died: 1486
- Occupation: Merchant wool trader
- Known for: Love letter to his future bride
- Spouse: Katherine Rich (Kateryn Ryche) (m. 1478)

Thomas Betson (d. 1486) was an English wool trader, a member of the Merchants of the Staple. His preserved correspondence with other merchants and suppliers in the 1470s and 1480s provides insight into the trade inside England and between England and continental Europe, mainly France and Flanders. He is also known today for penning a love letter to his kinswoman and future bride Katherine Rich (Kateryn Ryche) in June 1476, which historian C. L. Kingsford calls "one of the most charming of all private letters of the time that have survived."

== Love letter ==
Katherine Ryche, whom Betson married in 1478, was clearly at the time of this letter still young, perhaps 13 or 14, or "little more than a child" in Kingsford's phrase. Katherine was the eldest daughter of Elizabeth Stonor by her first husband, Thomas Ryche or Riche. She was god-daughter of her mother's grandfather, William Gregory, who left her 20 shillings in his will dated 6 November 1465; Gregory does not mention any other of his great-grandchildren. Kingsford conjectures that Katherine was born in 1463 or 1462, and that "Holake, your gentyll squyer" is probably the same Thomas Howlake who is mentioned in other primary sources of the time.

== Bibliography ==
- Bowden, Peter J. (1962). The Wool Trade in Tudor and Stuart England. London: Macmillan.
- Gairdner, James, ed. (1876). The Historical Collections of a Citizen of London in the Fifteenth Century. Westminster: Nichols and Son.
- Galbraith, V. H. (1948). Studies in the Public Records. Thomas Nelson and Sons Ltd.
- Hanham, Alison (1985). The Celys and Their World: An English Merchant Family of the Fifteenth Century. Cambridge & New York: Cambridge University Press.
- Hanham, Alison. "The Stonors and Thomas Betson: Some Neglected Evidence"
- Kingsford, Charles Lethbridge, ed. (1919). "166. Thomas Betson to Katherine Ryche 1 June, 1476". The Stonor Letters and Papers, 1290–1483. Vol. 2. London: Royal Historical Society.
- Myers, A. R. (1969). English Historical Documents, 1327–1485. Vol. 4. Oxford University Press. p. 1204 [708].
- Power, Eileen (1924). Medieval People, 1st ed. London: Methuen & Co. Ltd. p. 127
