= James William Benson =

English scientific instrument maker and watchmaker

- Born: 12 April 1826; Reading, Berkshire
- Died: 7 October 1878 (aged 52)
- Occupation(s): scientific instrument and watchmaker

James William Benson (12 April 1826 – 7 October 1878) was an English scientific instrument maker, gold/silversmith, and watchmaker.

== Early life ==
James William Benson was born in Reading, Berkshire, England. He was the son of William Benson and Phoebe Suckley.

== Career ==
Samuel Suckley Benson (born in 1822 in London) and James William Benson founded the company S. S. & J. W. Benson in 1847. They purchased the premises, and possibly the business interests, of established companies in London at Cornhill and Ludgate Hill, from which they sometimes claimed a date of foundation of 1749. The partnership was dissolved on 27 January 1855 and James William continued in business under the name 'J. W. Benson'. James William Benson died on 7 October 1878, aged 52, and his sons James, Alfred and Arthur took over the running of the business.

Throughout its history, J. W. Benson Ltd was official watchmaker to the Admiralty and the War Department and also held a number of royal warrants, being watchmakers to Queen Victoria, the Prince of Wales, the Tsar of Russia, Abu Bakar of Johor and several other royal families.

The company's premises were in Cornhill (1847–64), Ludgate Hill (1854-1937), Old Bond Street (1872-3), and Royal Exchange (1892-1937), and their original workshop was at 4-5 Horseshoe Court (at the rear of their Ludgate Hill premises). In 1892 J. W. Benson became a limited company and moved to a new 'steam' factory at 38 Belle Sauvage Yard.

During World War II the factory was bombed, destroying thousands of timepieces and from this point on the company no longer manufactured its own watches, but still continued as a retailer. The timepieces bearing the company name used high-quality Swiss movements supplied by manufacturers such as, Vertex (Revue), Universal Genève, Cyma/Tavannes, Longines and by the English maker, S. Smith & Sons.

J. W. Benson Ltd continued until 1973 at which time the name was sold to the royal jewellers, Garrards.
