= Thomas Betson (writer) =

Thomas Betson (d. 1516) was a writer who worked as the librarian of Syon Abbey, Middlesex where he served as a deacon from 1481 until the end of his life. Betson had secular as well as religious interests, and his personal notebook (St John's College, Cambridge MS. 109 E.6) contains information on such disparate subjects as theology, the legal system, runology, herbology, medicine and astronomy. Of note are two annotated diagrams of the night sky, probably copied from another source.

== Bibliography ==
- Erler, Mary Carpenter (1985). "Syon Abbey's Care for Books: its Sacristan's Account Rolls 1506/7–1535/6". Scriptorium. pp. 293–307.
- Forbes, Stuart; Adams, John, eds. (2012). "The Draft Papers of Thomas Betson". Syon Abbey Society.
- Jones, E. A.; Walsham, A., eds. (2010). Syon Abbey and its Books: Reading, Writing and Religion, c.1400-1700 (NED-New edition). Boydell & Brewer.
