= Haldon House =

Georgian country house in Devon, England

Coordinates: 50.6710°N 3.5834°W

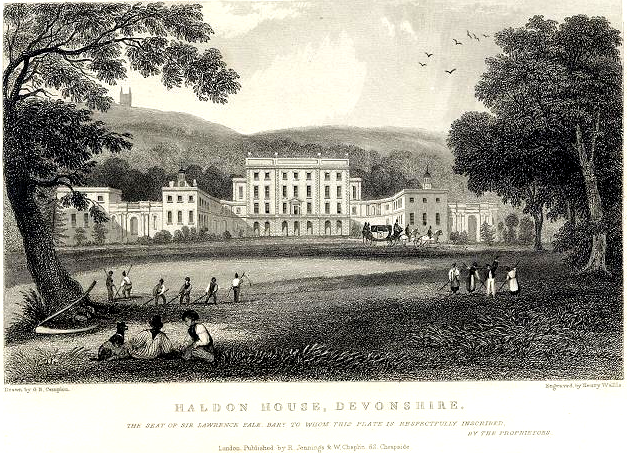
Haldon House, east front, 1830 engraving. Haldon Belvedere is visible on the hilltop behind left.

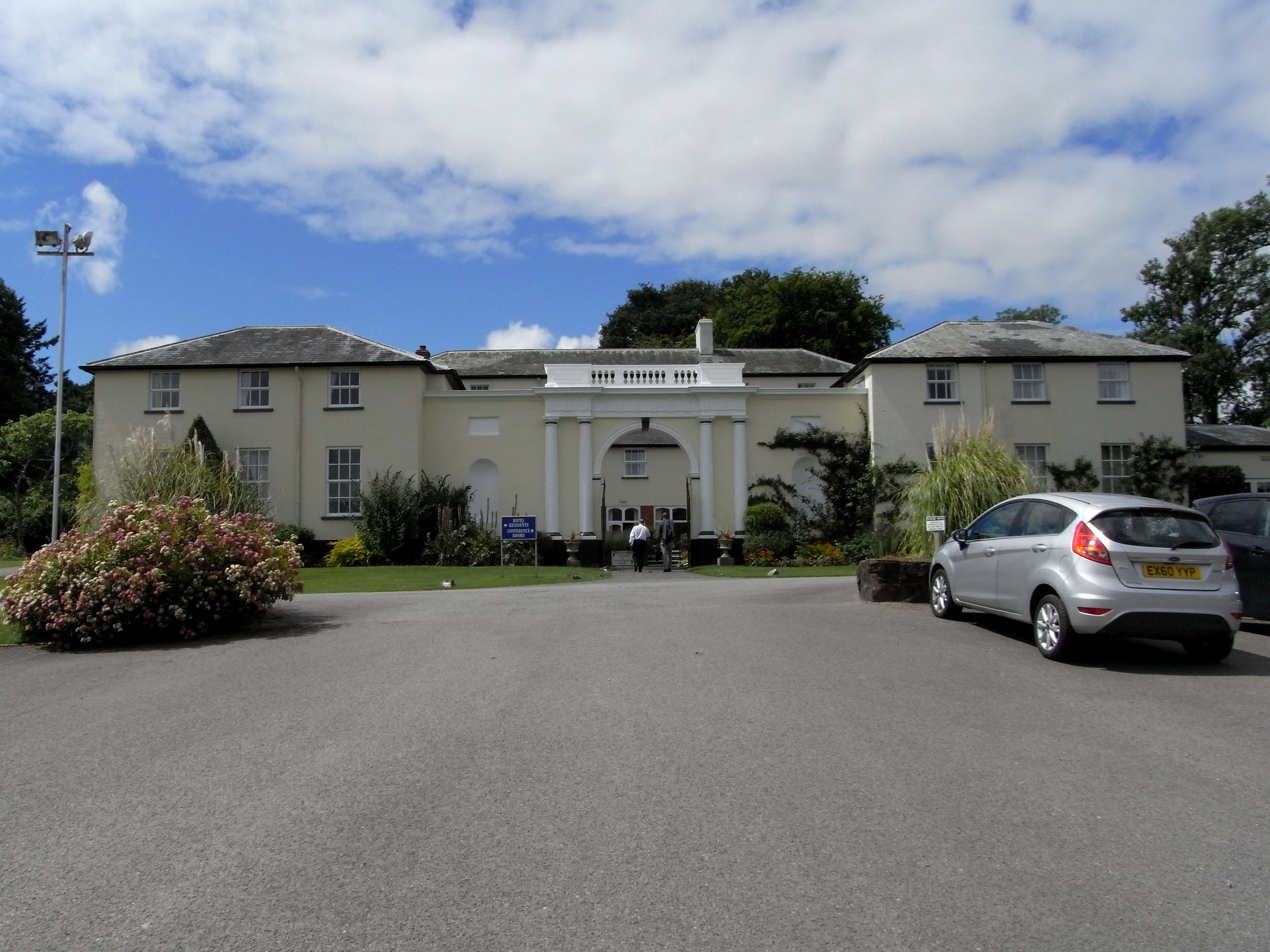
North Pavilions, former stables block and a remnant of the house, now the Lord Haldon Hotel. The main house was set back to the left (south).

Haldon House (pronounced: "Hol-don") on the eastern side of the Haldon Hills in the parishes of Dunchideock and Kenn, near Exeter in Devon, England, was a large Georgian country house largely demolished in the 1920s. The surviving north wing of the house, comprising the entrance front of the stable block, consists of two cuboid lodges linked by a screen pierced by a Triumphal Arch, with later additions, and serves today as the "Lord Haldon Hotel". The house was originally flanked by two such paired pavilions, as is evident from 19th century engravings.

== History ==
According to Nikolaus Pevsner, the house was built in about 1735 by Sir George Chudleigh, 4th Baronet (died 1738), and was supposedly influenced by Buckingham House in London, built in about 1715. Chudleigh's ancestral seat was at nearby Ashton House, on the west side of Haldon Hill, the residence of his family since about 1320, and which he abandoned to build Haldon House on the east side of the hill. In 1798 Ashton House was in ruins. Sir George married Frances Davie (1697-1748), one of the four daughters and co-heiresses of Sir William Davie, 4th Baronet (1662-1706/7) of Creedy, Sandford, Devon. Chudleigh died leaving four daughters who were co-heiresses.

The second of George Chudleigh's daughters was Frances, whose share of her paternal inheritance was Haldon and Ashton. She married Sir John Chichester, 5th Baronet (1721-1784), who already had a grand seat at Youlston Park in North Devon, and sold Haldon to Mrs Anne Basset.

"Mrs Anne Basset" (1718-1760), née Prideaux was a daughter and co-heir of Sir Edmund Prideaux, 5th Baronet of Netherton, and was the widow of John Pendarvis Basset (1713–1739) of Tehidy in Cornwall. He was a member of the junior branch of the prominent Basset family of Umberleigh and Heanton Punchardon in North Devon. Her only son, John Prideaux Basset, pre-deceased her in 1756, aged 16. She sold Haldon to John Jones, Esq. who sold it to William Webber who, in turn, sold it to Sir Robert Palk in about 1770.

=== Palk ===
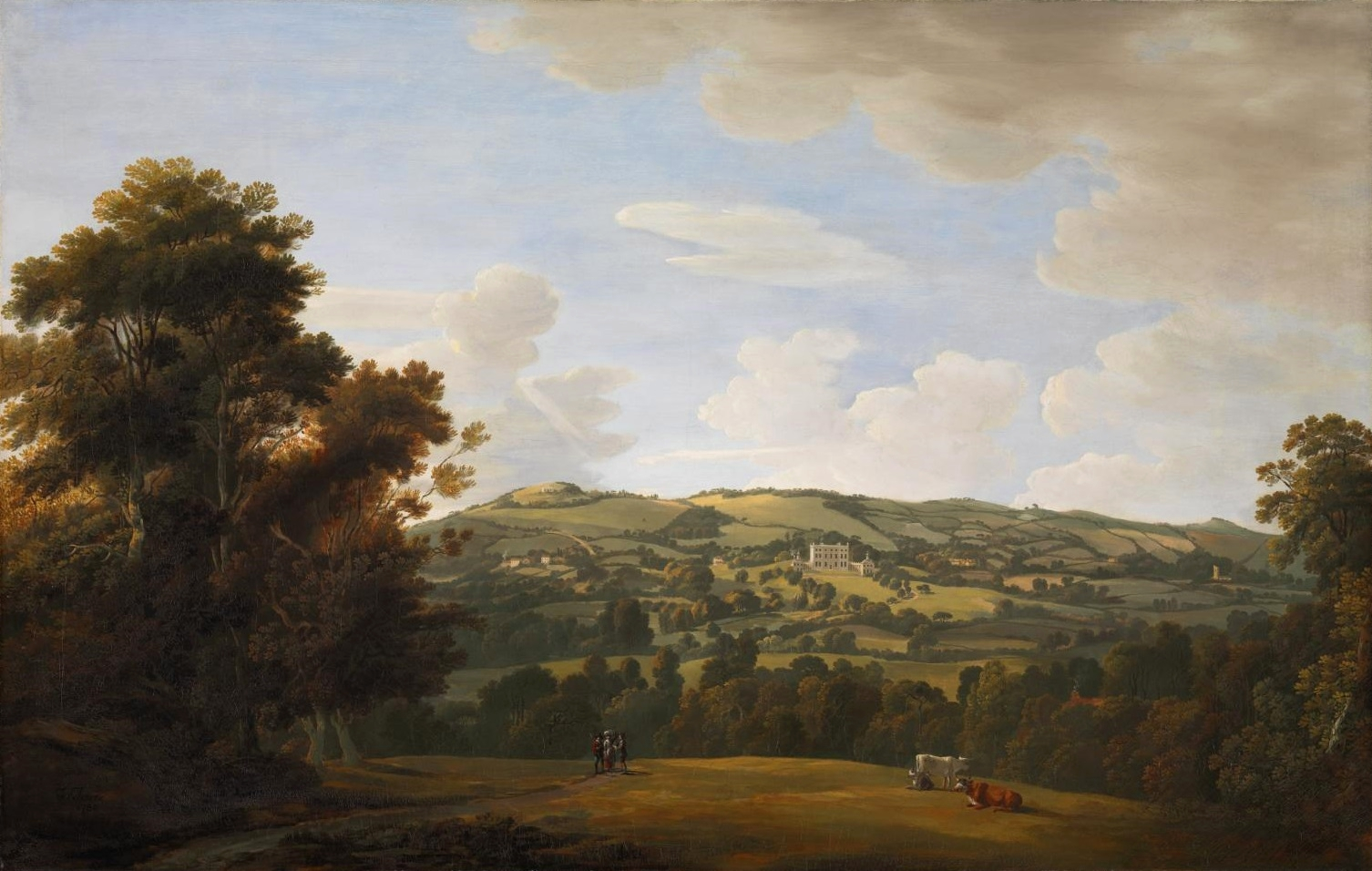
Haldon House, east front, painting by Francis Towne, commissioned in 1780 by Sir Robert Palk, 1st Baronet

Sir Robert Palk, 1st Baronet (1717–1798) was a former officer of the East India Company and Governor of Madras Province. He purchased the house for £10,000 and started to re-model and enlarge it, as well as improving its grounds. He added the two protruding wings to the eastward-facing front of the house, and according to Richard Polwhele, writing in 1793, he lowered the ground in front so that the rooms formerly in the basement became visible, thereby heightening the main block to four floors instead of three. Polwhele also reported that Palk had covered the brick-built house with stucco (Note: Described by Polwhele as "Rawlinson's patent stucco") to give the effect that it was built of stone. He had also added two "geometrical staircases" and laid a new floor in the hall made from red and yellow wood which he had "taken from the French at one of the sieges" in the East Indies. John Swete (1752–1821), who lived at Oxton House nearby and who wrote extensively in his journals about the houses and gardens of Devon's gentry, did not approve of Palk's addition of the wings to the house. (Note: Swete wrote that the wings blocked out part of the fine view and "not only detract from the elegance of the building, but also that kitchen and stable are not pleasant objects to be obtruded upon the sight and smell, not is it an agreeable circumstance, that the privacy of the Master and Mistress, at the door or the window, should be interrupted by the observation of a scullion or a groom.")

Richard Polwhele further stated that thousands of trees had recently been planted in the grounds, and a decorative garden that had previously been adjacent to the south of the house had been moved further away allowing the house to be surrounded on all sides by lawn "with suitable plantations", amounting to fifty acres in all.

Major-General Stringer Lawrence (1697–1775) spent his retirement at Haldon House as a guest of Palk, his friend from Indian days. Stringer Lawrence bequeathed the huge sum of £50,000 to Palk and in 1788 Palk erected the triangular 26-metre-high "Lawrence Tower" (alias "Haldon Belvedere") on his estate to his memory. Located on the ridge of the hills, about a mile south-west of the house, the tower was and still is visible from afar. The house was visited by several notable people, including King George III (1760–1820), whom Sir Robert Palk escorted to view the Lawrence Tower along a specially made carriage drive.

Sir Robert was succeeded by Sir Lawrence Palk, 2nd Baronet (c. 1766–1813), Sir Lawrence Vaughan Palk, 3rd Baronet (1793–1860), Sir Lawrence Palk, 4th Baronet (1818–1883) (created Baron Haldon in 1880) and Lawrence Hesketh Palk, 2nd Baron Haldon (1846–1903). The later Palks did not spend much time at Haldon, preferring their properties in Torquay, the development of which town the family was deeply involved, or elsewhere.

Lawrence Hesketh Palk was a keen gambler and had inherited the estate from his father with mortgage debts estimated at one stage to be £400,000. He was declared bankrupt in January 1891, and sales of the art and valuables from Haldon commenced the following month. Haldon House itself was sold in 1892 to Thomas Bedford Bolitho, a Cornish banker and MP.

=== Later history ===
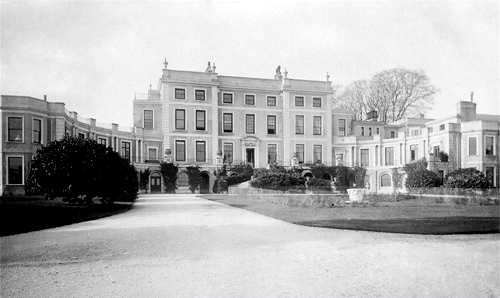
Photograph circa 1900

In 1897 James FitzGerald Bannatyne of Summerville and Fanningstown Castle, Co. Limerick, Ireland, purchased Haldon House from Bolitho. Bannatyne was a Deputy Lieutenant and Justice of the Peace for Devon. He was one of the nine original subscribers at the foundation in 1897 of the "Wireless Telegraph & Signal Company Ltd.", later "Marconi's Wireless Telegraph Co. Ltd.". Marconi performed some of his early experiments in radio transmission from the top of the Haldon Hills.

Bannatyne married Emily Gertrude Wilson, of Collipriest Cottage, Tiverton. His daughter Mary Stuart Bannatyne married Major Ludovic Heathcoat-Amory, son of Sir John Heathcoat-Amory, 1st Baronet of Knightshayes Court, near Tiverton. Bannatyne died on October 18, 1915, and on 14 May 1916 his only son Major James Fitzgerald Bannatyne was killed in action during World War I.

Mrs Bannatyne moved away in 1919 and put the estate up for sale. (Note: Mrs Bannatyne had acquired the Palk Manuscripts, an important collection of over 500 letters written to Sir Robert Palk. They were published by the Historic Manuscripts Commission in 1922.) A single buyer for the estate was not forthcoming and it was split up and sold piecemeal. At the time of its demolition in 1925 the house had six reception rooms (sizes 30 by 20 feet, 22 by 30, 50 by 17 1/2, 28 1/2 by 18 1/2, 22 by 22 1/2 and one other), 38 bedrooms, a ballroom, theatre and chapel to seat 100. No buyer could be found and with the gardens and a 5-acre field it was withdrawn at £1,350. The final sale of the last of the estate was in 1925. (Note: Lauder (1997) devotes eight pages to the details of the auctions and sales of the various parts of the estate) The furnishings of the chapel were purchased by Clifton College for its own chapel.
