= Rattery =

Village and civil parish in Devon, England

Coordinates: 50°26′N 3°46′W

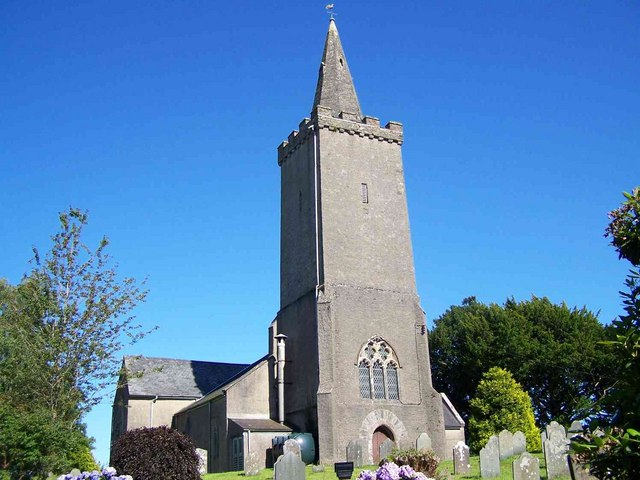
- St Mary's Church, Rattery

- Location within Devon
- Population: 458 (2001 census)
- Civil parish: Rattery
- District: South Hams
- Shire county: Devon
- Region: South West
- Country: England
- Sovereign state: United Kingdom

Rattery is a village and civil parish in the South Hams district, in the county of Devon, England, a few miles from the towns of Buckfastleigh and Ashburton . The name has been suggested as a variant of Red Tree but is mentioned in the Domesday Book of 1086 as Ratreu. In 2001 the parish had a population of 458.

The village is part of the electoral ward of Eastmoor. The ward population at the 2011 census was 2,321.

== Historic estates ==
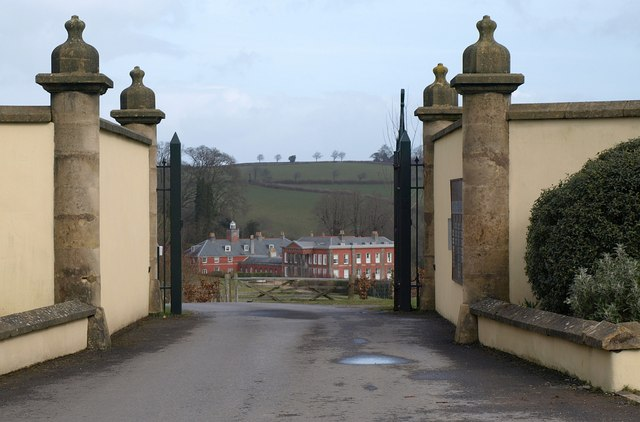
Marley House, renamed "Syon Abbey" in 1925

Historic estates within the parish of Rattery include:

- Marley House, a Georgian mansion built by Walter Palk (1742-1819), MP, renamed "Syon Abbey" in 1925 when the formerly exiled community of nuns whose antecedents were from Syon Monastery, Twickenham, Middlesex, dissolved by King Henry VIII, took up residence.
- Luscombe, a Domesday Book estate mentioned as held from the manor of Dartington and later the seat of the Luscombe family from before the 16th century to shortly before 1810. Purchased from the Luscombe family by Walter Palk (1742-1819). Not to be confused with Luscombe Castle, a 19th-century country house near Dawlish, about 16 miles to the north-east.
