= Robert Mackreth =

British politician

Sir Robert Mackreth (?1725–1819), of Ewhurst, Hampshire, was an English club owner, money lender, speculator and politician. He was a Member (MP) of the Parliament of Great Britain for Castle Rising from 1774 to 1784, and for Ashburton in the Parliament of Great Britain and the Parliament of the United Kingdom from 1784 to 1802.

== Life ==
Mackreth began life as a billiard-marker at White's Club. He acquired a vintner's business in St. James's Street, and became an assistant of Robert Arthur, the original proprietor of White's, who on his death, 6 June 1761, left the property to Mackreth, then about to marry his only child, Mary Arthur (the wedding took place in October). Mackreth managed the club through an agent, a near relation of his.

From this point Mackreth concentrated on financial speculations, with sidelines as a loan shark and bookmaker: Gilly Williams, writing to George Selwyn in 1768, mentions him as dealing heavily in the bets for and against the success of John Wilkes in the election for the City of London that year. In October 1774 he was nominated for the pocket borough of Castle Rising by the Earl of Orford, who had found him useful in business, and was in his debt.

Mackreth's reputation suffered in 1786, when he was defendant in a suit preferred by James Fox-Lane, an aristocratic member of White's, who charged Mackreth with defrauding him of his patrimony. The Master of the Rolls found that he had taken undue advantage of a young man, who was also a minor, and he had to refund £20,000. He appealed without success, first to the Lord Chancellor, and then to the House of Lords. Fox-Lane's counsel throughout the case was Sir John Scott; in 1792 Mackreth accosted Scott in Lincoln's Inn Fields, called him a liar and a scoundrel, and challenged him to a duel, for an alleged insult in one of his speeches in 1786. Eldon ignored the challenge, but brought an action for assault against Mackreth, who was sentenced by the court of King's Bench to six weeks' imprisonment and a fine, for a breach of the peace.

Politically, Mackreth backed Lord North, and then Richard Rigby. Later he supported William Pitt the Younger. He sat in the House of Commons for Ashburton from 1784 to 1802; and on 8 May 1795 he was knighted by George III. Withdrawing from parliamentary life in 1802, he retired to his estate at Ewhurst, near Basingstoke. He added to, besides his house property in London, an estate in Cumberland and a plantation in the West Indies. He died in London in February 1819, in his ninety-fourth year. His wife had died at Putney on 3 June 1784.
