= Knightstone, Ottery St Mary =

Historic manor in Devon, England

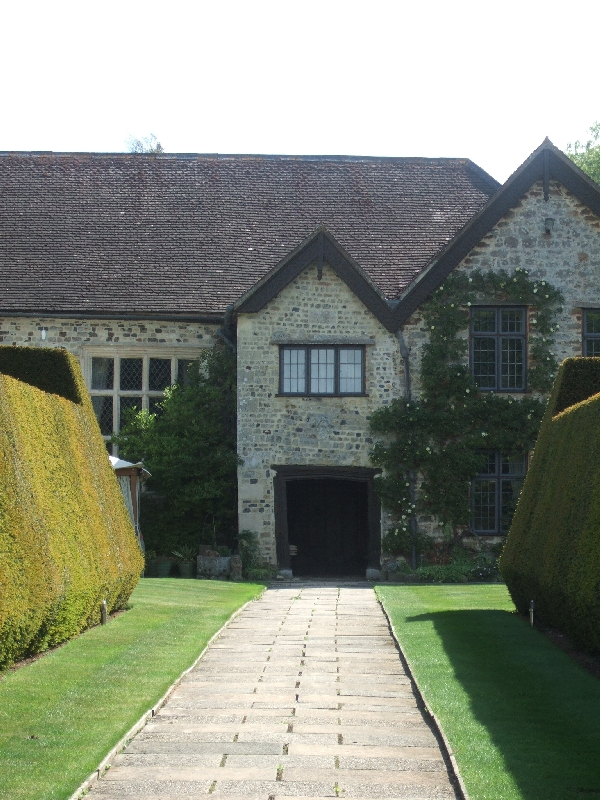
Knightstone House in 2011

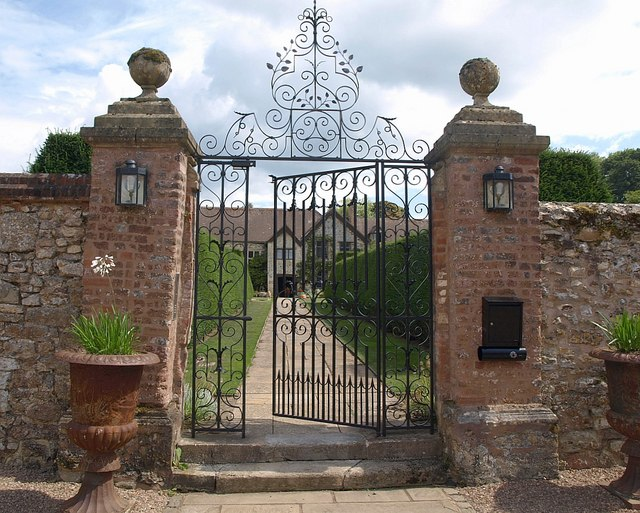
Entrance gates to Knightstone House

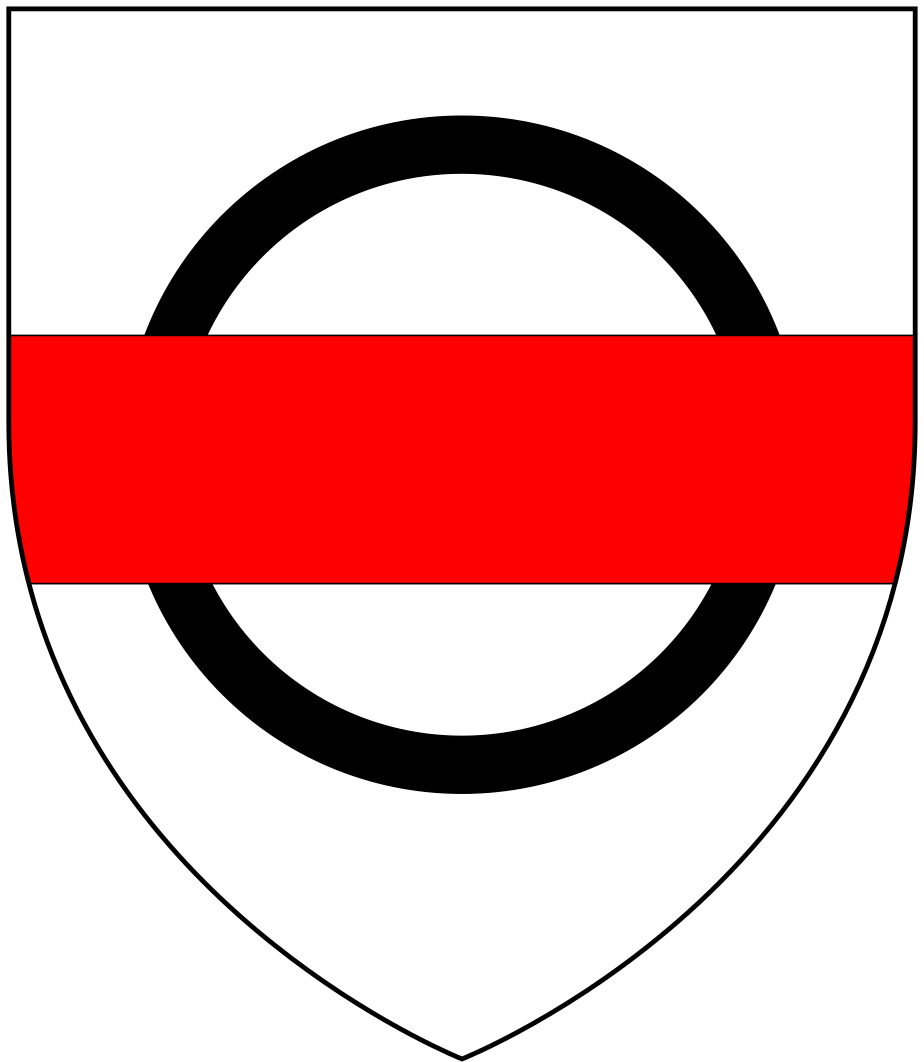
Arms of Bittlesgate: Argent, an annulet sable over all a fess gules

Knightstone is an historic manor in the parish of Ottery St Mary in Devon. The surviving mediaeval and Tudor grade I listed manor house is situated one mile south-east of St Mary's Church, Ottery St Mary. It was the seat of the Bittlesgate (alias Bedlisgate, etc.) family, the heiress of which Joan Bittlesgate, daughter of Thomas (or John) Bittlesgate by his wife Joan Beauchamp, was the wife of Richard Woodville (died 1441), grandfather of Elizabeth Woodville (c.1437–1492) Queen consort of England as the spouse of King Edward IV. In 1381 the Bittlesgate family obtained a licence from the Bishop of Exeter to build and operate a private chapel at their home, but no trace of the structure survives. The house has been much altered since the time of the Bittlesgate family. One Tudor-era fireplace survives in a bedroom.

== History ==
The earliest recorded holder was the de Knightstone family. In 1370 Richard de Knightstone, son of John de Knightstone, conveyed the estate to Thomas I Bittlesgate. His sister Margaret de Knightstone, wife of John Upton, together with her son Elias Upton, also executed a deed of release of her interest. Eventually his descendant Thomas II Bittlesgate entailed his lands to the children of his son Thomas III Bittlesgate, in failure of which to William Lord Bonville. As all the grandchildren of Thomas III Bittlesgate died childless, in accordance with the entail the estates descended to the great heiress Lady Cecily Bonville (1460–1529), wife of Thomas Grey, 1st Marquess of Dorset (1455–1501), the son of Elizabeth Woodville by her first husband Sir John Grey (c.1432–1461) of Groby in Leicestershire. The marriage of her son to the great heiress was arranged by the king as a mark of favour to Elizabeth. Cecily's inheritance was challenged, without success, by Anthony Woodville, 2nd Earl Rivers (c.1440–1483), descended from the Bittlesgate family, brother of Elizabeth Woodville. Cecily, who lived at Shute House near Axminster, Devon, built the magnificently vaulted Dorset Aisle on the north side of Ottery St Mary Church, and the north porch. Following the attainder of Cicely's grandson Henry Grey, 1st Duke of Suffolk (1517–1554), his estates escheated to the Crown, which sold Knightstone to William Sherman, a wealthy merchant of Ottery St Mary.

=== Sherman family ===
Arms of Sherman: Or, a lion rampant sable between three holly leaves vert

Three monumental brasses of the Sherman family survive in Ottery St Mary Church, at the east end of the south aisle, one dated 1542, another 1583.

==== William Sherman (fl.1567) ====
William Sherman (fl.1567), who purchased Knightstone, was the son of John Sherman of Ottery St Mary, and was the grandson of Robert Sherman of Yaxley in Suffolk. On the fireplace of the great hall is sculpted the date 1567 and his initials "WS". He married twice:

- Firstly to the daughter and heiress of the Trent family of Ottery, by whom he had various children including:
  - John Sherman (d.1617), eldest son and heir (see below);
  - William Sherman, 2nd son, died without issue.
  - Katherine Sherman, eldest daughter, wife of Gilbert Drake (d.1580) of Pratshead in the parish of Littleham, Devon, an uncle of Sir Bernard Drake (d.1586) of Mount Drake and Ash in the parish of Musbury, Devon.
  - Johanna Sherman, 2nd daughter, who married her step-mother's half-brother William Mallock of Axmouth, who in 1573 purchased the estates of Bindon in Axmouth and Rousdon, eldest son and heir (by his 2nd wife Elizabeth Chaplyn) of John Mallock (d.1566/7), a Member of Parliament for Poole in Dorset. In 1654 their descendant Roger Mallock purchased Cockington Court in Tor Mohun, now Torquay.
  - Agnes Sherman, wife of William Coram (d.1606/7) of Ottery St Mary.
- Secondly he married Joan Mallock, a daughter of John Mallock (d.1566/7), a Member of Parliament for Poole in Dorset. by his first wife Matilda Weston. By Joan Mallock he had a 3rd son:

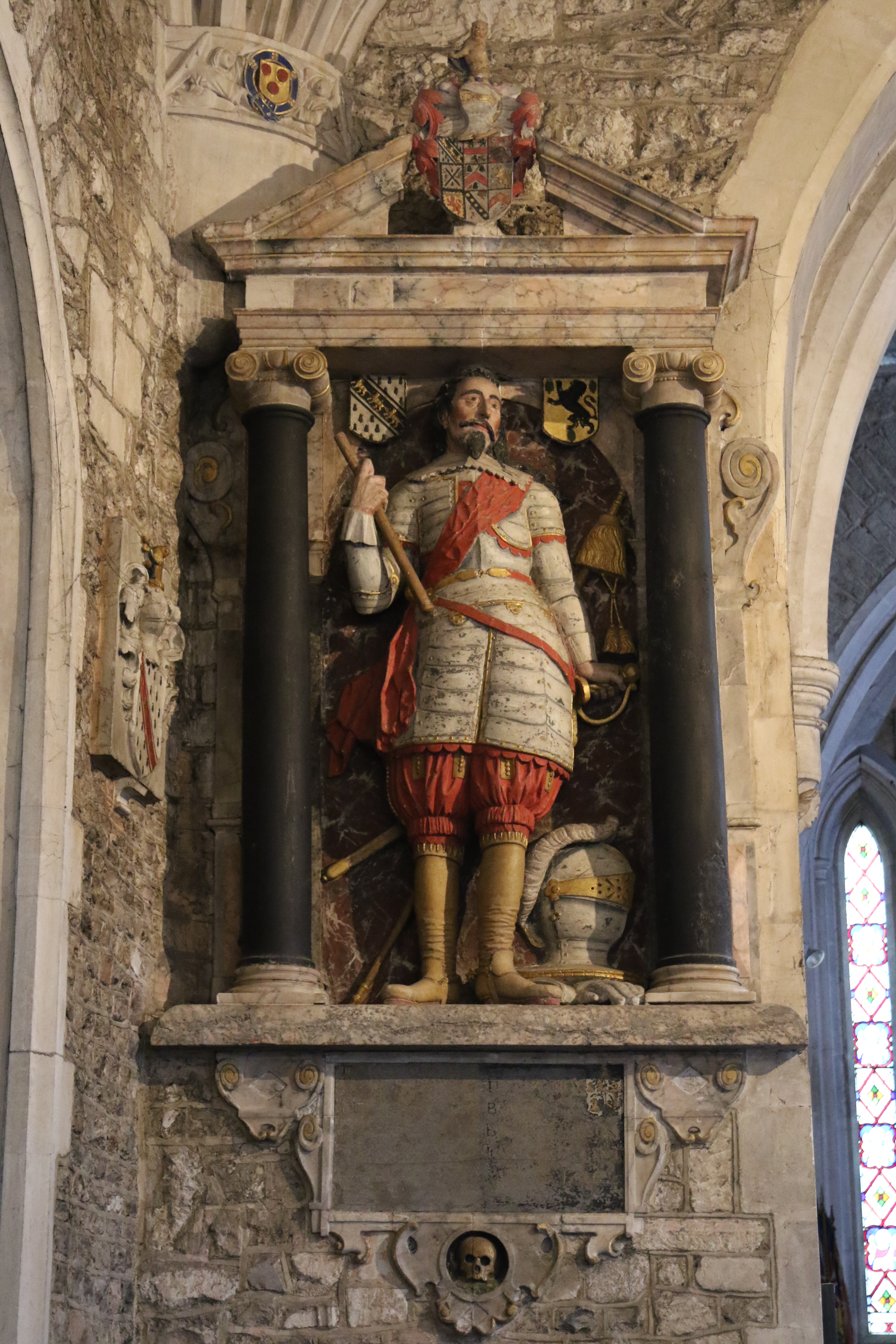
Monument of John Cooke (d.1632) of Thorne. Ottery St Mary Church. He married his step-sister Margaret Sherman (d.1614), a grand-daughter of William Sherman of Knightstone. The arms of Sherman appear above his left shoulder

  - Richard Sherman, who married firstly Joan Eveleigh, a daughter of John Eveleigh of Holcombe in the parish of Ottery St Mary, and a sister of Nicholas Eveleigh (1562–1618) of Bovey Tracey, whose monument with effigy survive in Bovey Tracey Church. By Joan Eveleigh he had issue including a daughter Margaret Sherman (d.1614) who married her step-brother John Cooke (d.1632) whose large mural monument with standing effigy survives in Ottery St Mary Church. In 1596 Richard married secondly Jone Copleston (d.1648/9), a daughter of Richard Copleston of Woodland in the parish of Little Torrington, Devon, and widow of Christopher Cooke of Thorne in the parish of Ottery St Mary.

==== John Sherman (d.1617) ====
John Sherman (d.1617), eldest son and heir.

==== Gyddion Sherman (born 1598) ====
Gedeon Sherman (born 1598), son and heir, was living at Knightstone at the time of Pole (d. 1635). {br}

== Sources ==
- Pevsner, Nikolaus & Cherry, Bridget, The Buildings of England: Devon, London, 2004, pp. 528–9;
- Pole, Sir William (d.1635), Collections Towards a Description of the County of Devon, Sir John-William de la Pole (ed.), London, 1791, p. 148, Knighteston;
- Risdon, Tristram (d.1640), Survey of Devon, 1811 edition, London, 1811, with 1810 Additions, p. 46, Knightston
- Listed building text "Knightstone: a Grade I Listed Building in Ottery St. Mary, Devon"
- Vivian, Lt.Col. J.L., (Ed.) The Visitations of the County of Devon: Comprising the Heralds' Visitations of 1531, 1564 & 1620, Exeter, 1895, p. 680, pedigree of Sherman;
- Rogers, William Henry Hamilton, The Dorset chapel and Knightstone; Bonville and Sherman; Ottery St. Mary, Notes and Queries for Somerset anmd Dorset, Vol.7, 1901, pp. 187–91,235-43,322. Reprinted in his Archaeological Papers Relating to the Counties of Somerset, Wilts, Hants and Devon, 1902.
