= Bernard Drake =

English nautical captain

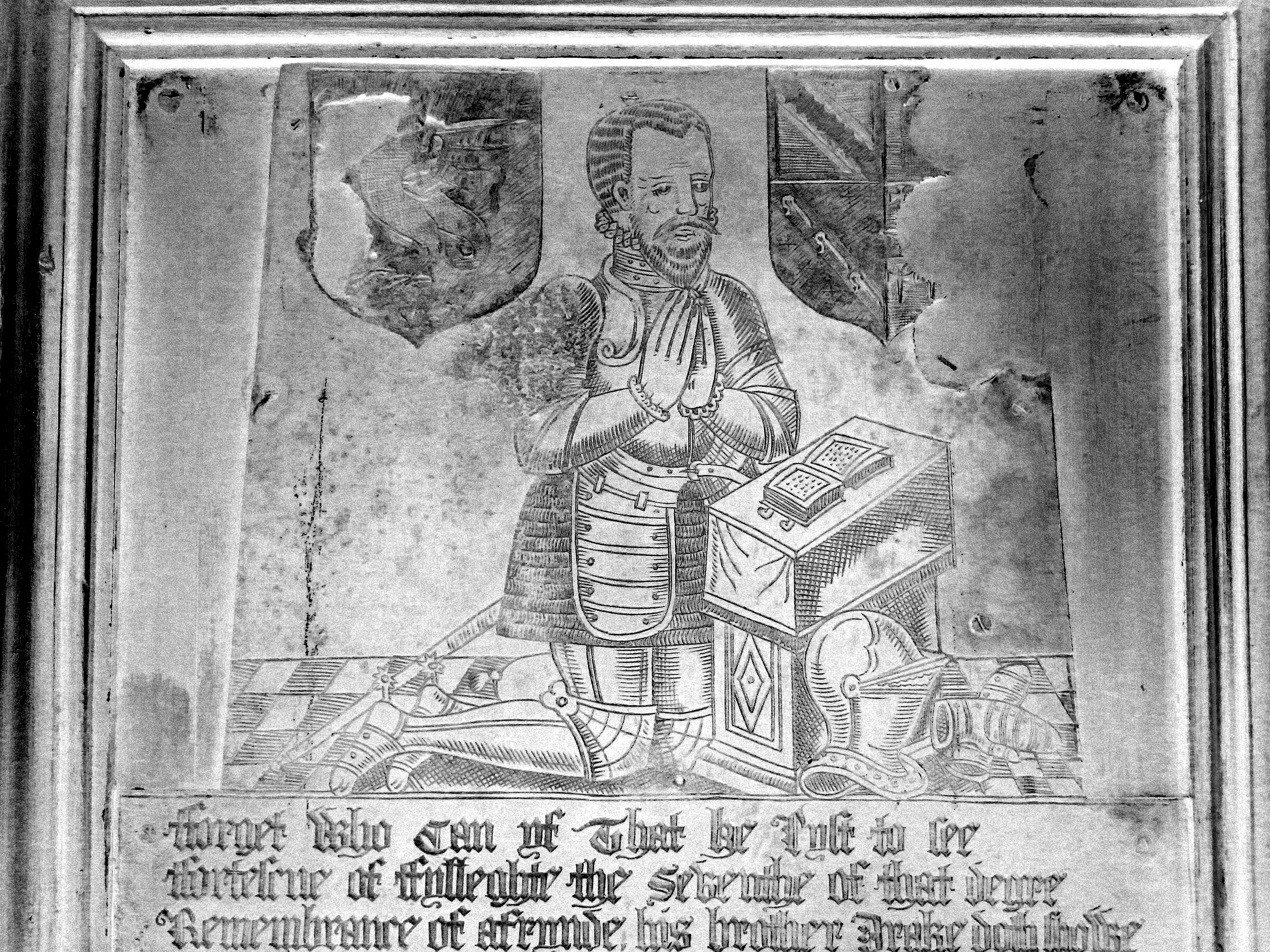
Monumental brass in Filleigh Church, North Devon, depicting Sir Bernard Drake (d. 1586), who erected the monument to which it was originally affixed in memory of his brother-in-law, Richard Fortescue (d. 1570).

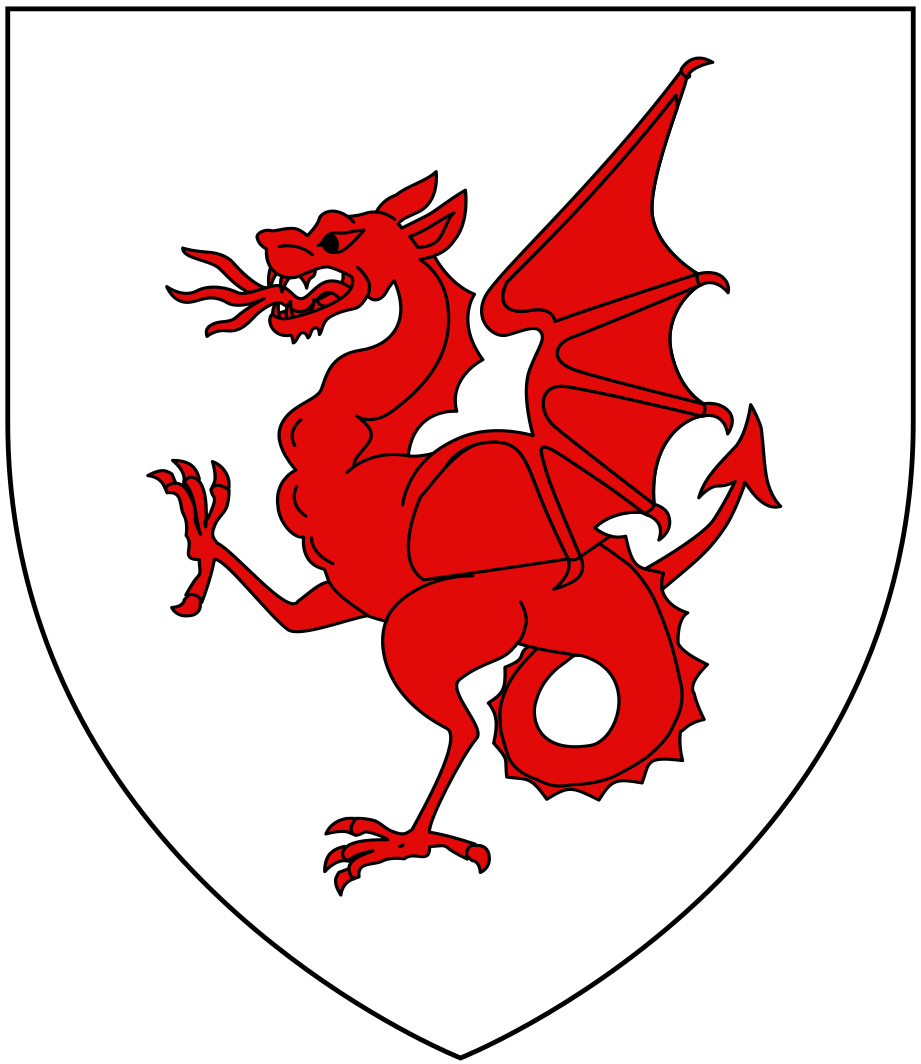
Arms of Drake of Ash: Argent, a wyvern wings displayed and tail nowed gules

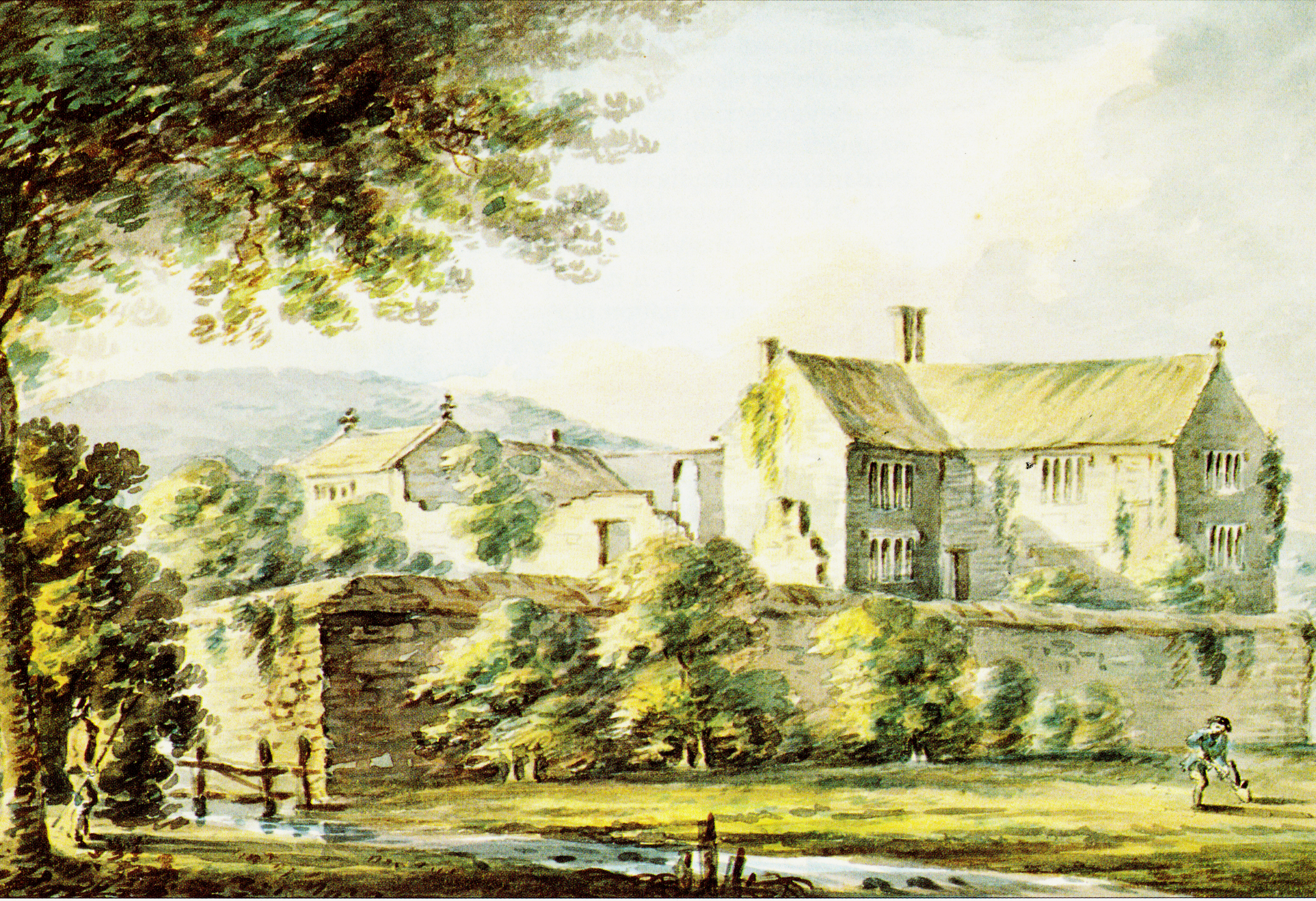
"Ash, ancient seat of the Drakes", watercolour dated 13 February 1795 by Rev. John Swete (1752–1821) of Oxton House, Devon. Devon Record Office 564M/F7/129. It was then in use as a farmhouse. This is the house re-built by Sir John Drake, 2nd Baronet (1647–1684) after its near destruction during the Civil War. The building at left is a chapel

Sir Bernard Drake (c. 1537 – 10 April 1586) of Ash in the parish of Musbury, Devon, was an English sea captain. He himself refuted any familial relationship with his contemporary the great Admiral Sir Francis Drake (c. 1540 – 1596), as their dispute concerning armorials reveals. In fact, Sir Bernard Drake's grandparents John Drake V 1474-1554 and his wife Margaret were also the grandparents of Sir Francis Drake; Sir Bernard being descended from an older son and Francis descended from a younger son. Hence, they were in fact first cousins.

== Origin ==
He was the eldest son of John Drake (d. 1558) of Ash, by his wife Amy Grenville (d. 1578/9), a daughter of Sir Roger Grenville (1477–1523), lord of the manor of Bideford in Devon and of Stowe in the parish of Kilkhampton, Cornwall, Sheriff of Cornwall in 1510–11, 1517–18, 1522, and present within the Cornish contingent at the Field of the Cloth of Gold. His brother was Richard Drake (1535–1603) of Esher, an Equerry of the Stable and Groom of the Privy Chamber to Queen Elizabeth I and a Member of Parliament. His uncle was Richard Grenville. Sir Bernard's aunt, Alice Drake, married Walter Raleigh and became the step-mother of Sir Walter Raleigh, the explorer and poet.

== Voyages ==
His life was uneventful until he became associated with Sir Humphrey Gilbert, perhaps through his relatives Richard Grenville and Walter Raleigh. Thus Bernard was first attracted to American ventures and, in December 1582, he was among the adventurers in a corporation established by Gilbert to exploit his royal grant in North America, although Drake's involvement seems to have been limited to his investment; Drake undertook to lead a party of adventurers to settle whatever part of North America Gilbert had sold him on paper. He did not participate in any overseas ventures, however, so far as is known, until 1585, by which time he had joined with Raleigh and Humphrey Gilbert's brother, John, in activities connected with the Roanoke Island Colony, in present-day North Carolina. When, on 26 May, the Spanish government placed an embargo on English shipping in Bilbao harbour, Raleigh commissioned Drake to warn English fishermen in Newfoundland of the embargo and to seize Spanish shipping. Dropping plans for a privateering voyage to the West Indies en route for Roanoke, where a colony was to be settled by Sir Richard Grenville who had left Plymouth in April, Drake left for Newfoundland in July.

=== Newfoundland ===
Drake's successful voyage began by taking a ship bound from Brazil to Portugal with a load of sugar. Alerting the British Newfoundland fishermen that their primary markets of Spain were now off-limits, he took several Spanish and Portuguese fishing vessels, detaching some of his own vessels to take them to England as prizes. Teaming up with Raleigh-associate George Raymond, he took several Spanish traders around the Azores carrying sugar, wine and ivory, as well as a French vessel bearing gold. The total takings of the expedition, about 20 ships, represented a profit estimated at 600%, from which as his share Drake and his son John received the four most valuable ships. Equally important, the voyage had deprived the Spanish navy and merchant marine of the dried fish on which they relied for their own voyages, leading the Spanish government to forbid ships from sailing to Newfoundland, while the Portuguese fishing fleet was permanently hobbled by their losses to Drake.

== Marriage and progeny ==
At an unknown date, Drake married Gertrude Fortescue, a daughter of Bartholomew Fortescue (d. 1557) of Filleigh, North Devon, and sister of Richard Fortescue (d. 1570) of Filleigh (ancestor of the Earls Fortescue) in whose memory he erected a monumental brass in Filleigh Church. Gertrude's mother was Ellen Moore, a daughter of Morris Moore (1459–1500) of Moor Hayes in the parish of Cullompton in Devon, by his wife Cecily Bonville, a daughter of John Bonville, base son of William Bonville, 1st Baron Bonville. By his wife he had six children:

- Hugh Drake (d. 1589), who died in Portugal in 1589, without progeny;
- John Drake (died 1628), of Mount Drake and Ashe, who married Dorothy Button (d. 1631), a daughter of William Button of Aston, Wiltshire; their son, Sir John Drake (d. 1636) of Ashe, married Eleanor Boteler, a daughter of John Boteler, 1st Baron Boteler of Brantfield, and was the maternal grandfather of John Churchill, 1st Duke of Marlborough;
- Marie Drake, who married Tynsley of Lincolnshire;
- Mary Drake, who married John Sherman, of Knightstone, Ottery St. Mary, Devon; their daughter Alice Drake married Richard Percivale and was ancestress of the Earls of Egmont;
- Eleanor Drake, who married John Button of Wiltshire.

== Death and burial ==
On 9 January 1586, Bernard Drake was knighted by Elizabeth I at Greenwich in recognition of his success. A couple of months later, the surviving Portuguese prisoners, whom Drake had had imprisoned in Exeter Castle, were put on trial, the charge perhaps being mutiny. Those who lived came to trial at the notorious Lent Black Assize of Exeter from 14 March 1586 held at Exeter Castle. The prisoners were so weak and ill that Drake was reprimanded by the judge, Edward Flowerdew (died 1586), Baron of the Exchequer, for his neglect. Within little more than three weeks, the judge, eleven of the twelve jurors and eight justices of the peace, who had been exposed to the prisoners, died from an infection caught from the Portuguese. Ill himself, Drake tried to reach home but died in Crediton on 10 April 1586, and was buried two days later. For more than a year an epidemic of what was apparently typhus raged in Devonshire. Drake's son, John, inherited Ashe as well as the profits of the Newfoundland voyage.

== Monument ==
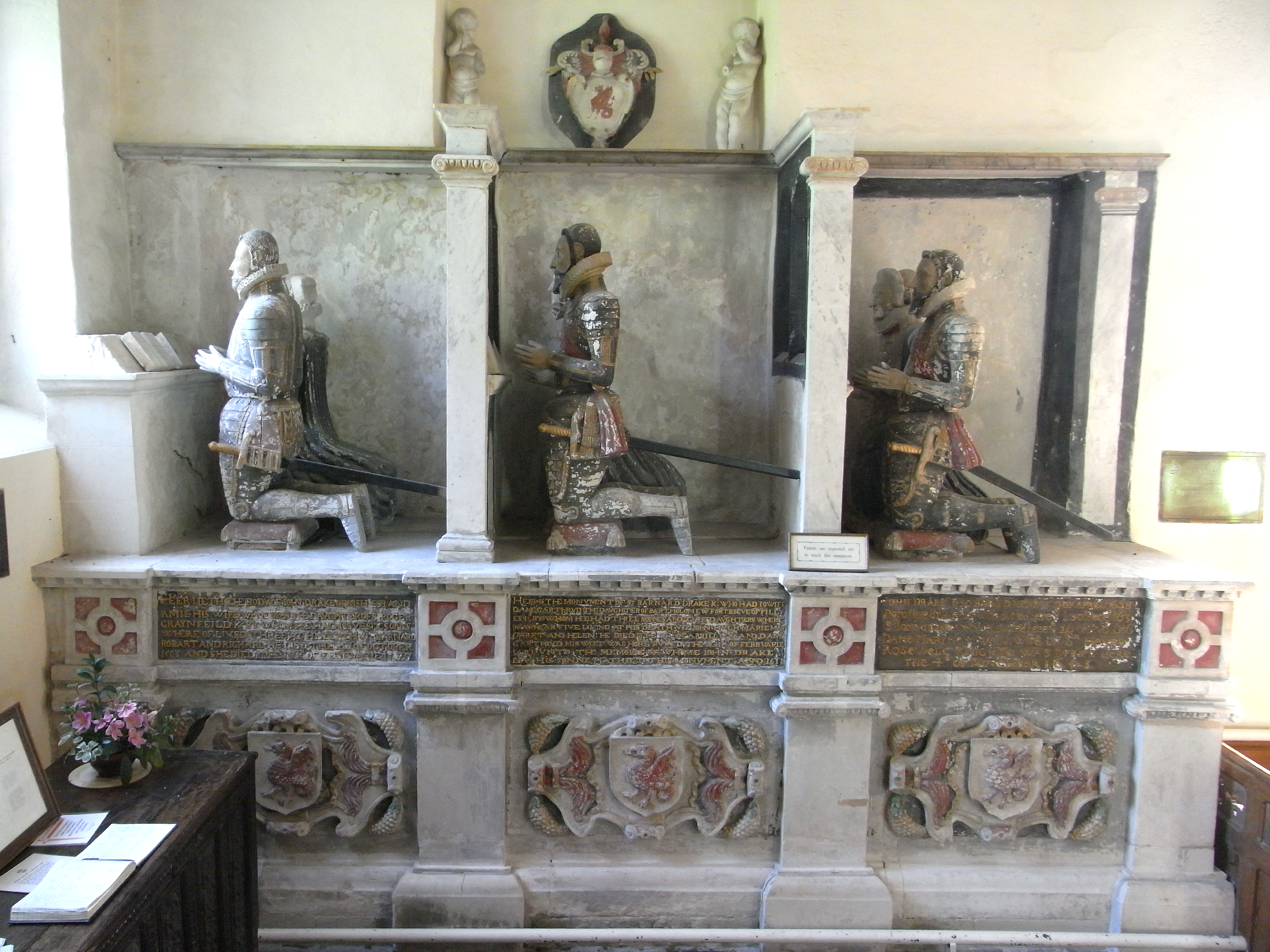
Monument to the Drake family of Ash, south aisle of Musbury Church. It depicts the following persons: left: John VI Drake (d. 1558), with his wife Amy Grenville (d. 1577); centre: Admiral Sir Bernard Drake (c. 1537 – 1586), his son, with his wife Gertrude Fortescue (d. 1601); right: John VII Drake (d. 1628), who erected the monument in 1611, son of Sir Bernard, with his wife Dorothy Button (d. 1631). Also shown four times are the arms of Drake: Argent, a wyvern wings displayed and tail nowed gules. Gilded inscribed biographical tablets appear under each couple of kneeling figures

A monument was erected by his son, John, in St. Michael's Church, Musbury, which shows three generations of family patriarchs at prayer, each kneeling with his wife. The inscription under the middle couple, being Sir Bernard and his wife, is as follows:

"Heer is the monument of Sr Barnard Drake Kt. who had to wife Dame Garthrud the daughter of Bartholomew Fortescue of Filly Esqr. by whom hee had three sonnes and three daughters where of whear five living at his death viz John, Hugh, Marie, Margaret and Helen. He died the Xth of April 1586 and Dame Garthrud his wief was here bured the XIIth of Februarie 1601 unto the memorie of whome John Drake Esqr. his sonne hath set this monument Anno 1611"

== Coat of Arms ==
The coat of arms of the ancient family of Drake of Ash, Argent, a wyvern gules, can be seen on the monument to Sir Bernard erected at Musbury Church in 1611. Sir Francis Drake, the great sea-captain, a first cousin to Sir Bernard, when knighted by Queen Elizabeth in 1581 assumed the arms of Drake of Ash, which action was contested by Sir Bernard, as the anecdote recorded by John Swete (d. 1821), noted by him from John Prince's "Worthies of Devon" (1697), relates:

"By the assumption of the arms of the family of Ash, Sir Francis Drake incurr'd the displeasure of Sir Bernard, insomuch that Sir Francis receiv'd from the indignant knight a box on the ear, and that even within the precinct of the court. The Queen was of too haughty a spirit to permit such an outrage to pass unpunish'd and not only reprehended Sir Bernard but as a check to the pride of the one and as what was due to the merit of the other, bestow'd on Sir Francis a new coat of arms allusive to his having circumnavigated the world: Diamond, a fess wavy between two pole stars Arctic and Antarctic pearl and a crest: A ship on a globe under ruff held by a cable rope with a hand out of the clouds in the rigging whereof is hung up by the heels a wivern gules, tha arms of Sir Bernard, which indignity the knight bore as well as he might, observing that though Her Majesty might give Sir Francis a nobler, yet she could not give an antienter coat than his."

Queen Elizabeth awarded Sir Francis his own distinct coat of arms, but nonetheless, in spite of Sir Bernard's protests, he continued to use the arms of Drake of Ash, as he sealed several documents with the wyvern arms quartered with his new coat.
