= Richard Drake =

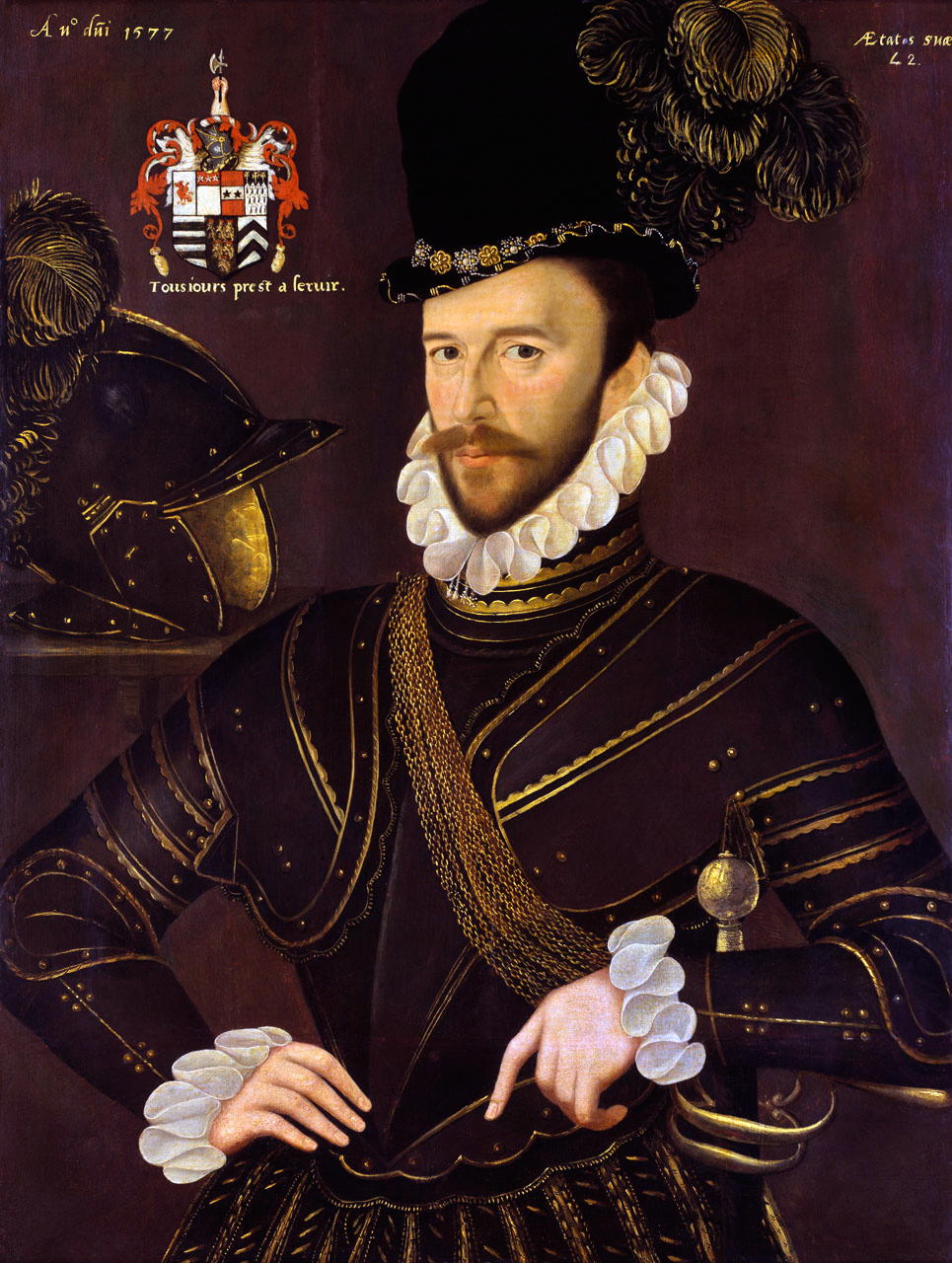
- Drake, by George Gower, 1577, National Maritime Museum, Greenwich
- Born: 1535
- Died: 11 July 1603
- Spouse: Ursula Stafford
- Children: 1

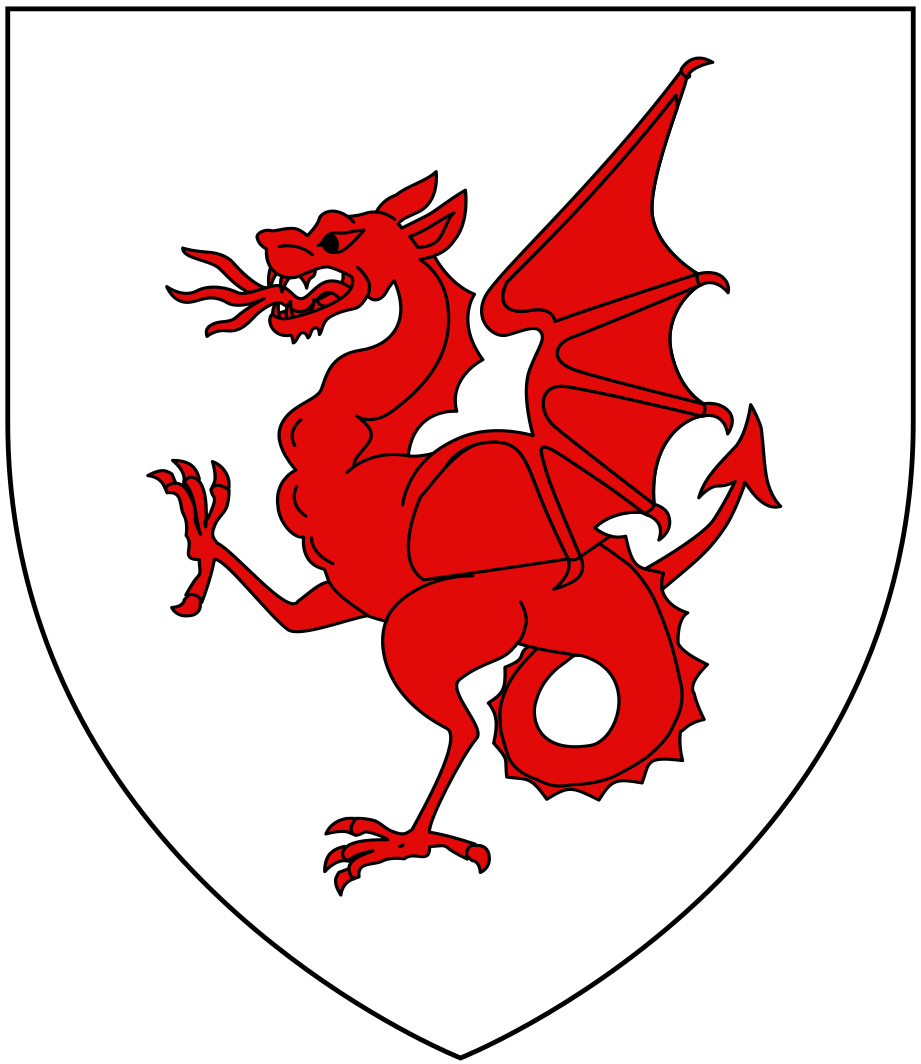
Arms of Drake of Ash: Argent, a wyvern wings displayed and tail nowed gules

Richard Drake of Esher (1535 – 11 July 1603), was Equerry of the Stable and Groom of the Privy Chamber to Queen Elizabeth I. He also held office as a Member of Parliament and Justice of the Peace.

== Family ==
Drake was the third son of John Drake (d. 1558), of Ash in the parish of Musbury, Devonshire, and Amy Grenville, daughter of Sir Roger Grenville of Stowe, Cornwall. Drake had three brothers, Sir Bernard Drake, Robert Drake and Sir Francis Drake 1540-1596.

== Career ==
Drake was an equerry of the stable to Queen Elizabeth by 1577, and a Groom of the Privy Chamber in 1584. In 1589 he was appointed surveyor of game in Woking Park, and in 1590 steward (office) of the manor of Woking. As a courtier, Drake required a residence near London, and in 1583 he leased Esher Place from Charles, Lord Howard of Effingham.

Drake combined service in the royal household with elected and appointed office. He was Member of Parliament for Morpeth in 1572, and for Castle Rising in 1584. He was a Justice of the Peace for Surrey from about 1591, and a commissioner for the subsidy in 1593.

Drake is said to have been 'high in the Queen's favour', and received valuable grants from her, including gold and silver from the Spanish Armada and a monopoly for manufacturing aqua vitae. In about 1602 the Queen granted him the residue of the moneys still owing to her from Sir Francis Drake's voyage of 1585–86.

Drake served as factor and prize agent to Sir Francis Drake (to whom he may have been distantly related), taking charge of the Spanish Armada prisoners taken off Plymouth in 1588, which included the Spanish vice-admiral, Don Pedro de Valdez, whom he kept at his manor of Esher in Surrey, pending arrangements for the ransom, a subject over which his heirs and those of Sir Francis quarrelled.

Drake died 11 July 1603. In his will, made 31 May 1603 and proved 31 January 1604, he asked to be buried in Esher church, and appointed his only child, Francis Drake, as his executor. He left his widow, Ursula, his lease of the manor of Walton-on-Thames and the parsonage there, as well as a house in Fetter Lane, and his coach and horses. His other lands and goods, including the manor of Esher, were left to his son, Francis, who sold Esher after 1631. The ancient manor house had been a seat of Cardinal Wolsey, purchased from him by Henry VIII, temporarily returned to the see under Mary and eventually conveyed by Elizabeth to Charles, Lord Howard of Effingham, from whom Drake must have purchased it.

== Marriage and issue ==
Drake married Ursula Stafford, daughter of Sir William Stafford and Dorothy Stafford, by whom he had a son, Francis Drake (d. 1634).
