= Black Assize of Exeter 1586 =

The Black Assizes is an epithet given to several outbreaks of "gaol fever" which struck various prisons and court-houses in England in the late 16th century and which caused the deaths of not only many prisoners awaiting trial but also the magistrates in the court buildings holding assizes.

== Causes ==
The basic cause was fever spreading from insanitary jails via prisoners into dirty and overcrowded courtrooms.

== Notable outbreaks ==
The most notable Black Assizes were:

- 1577: Black Assize of Oxford in Summer 1577. Among the dead victims were: Chief Baron Bell, Serjeant Barham, the Clerk of Assize, the Lord Lieutenant, the High Sheriff of Oxfordshire, the Coroner and almost 400 others. The names of the dead were recorded and survive as "The note of such as ar ded of this infection in Oxenford" in Bodleian manuscript Tanner 79 folio 182.
- 1598 Black Assizes of Northern Circuit. Among the dead were Baron Flowerdew, Justice Beaumont and "Serjeant Drewe", namely Edward Drew (c.1542–1598), MP, of Killerton, Broadclyst and The Grange, Broadhembury, Devon, a Serjeant-at-Law to Queen Elizabeth I.
- 1586 Black Assizes at Exeter Castle, end of March 1586

== Exeter Black Assize 1586 ==
The Black Assizes at Exeter Castle were the Lent Assizes held from 14 March 1586 by Sir Edmund Anderson (1530–1605), Lord Chief Justice of the Common Pleas, who survived the disease. Exeter Prison was situated underneath the royal Exeter Castle and the courtrooms were within the castle buildings. The cause according to modern medical opinion was typhus transmitted by the human body-louse. Among the dead victims were 8 judges, 11 of the 12 jurors, several constables, and the surrounding population which was ravaged by the disease for several months. Amongst the dead were the following, many being prominent members of the Devonshire gentry:

- Edward Flowerdew (died 1586), Serjeant-at-Law and Baron of the Exchequer
- Sir Arthur Basset (1541–1586), JP, of Umberleigh. Buried at Atherington 2 April 1586.
- Sir John Chichester (died 31 March 1586) of Raleigh, JP. He was Sheriff of Devon in 1585.
- Robert III Cary (died 1 April 1586), JP, MP, lord of the manor of Clovelly, whose monument survives in Clovelly Church.
- Thomas Carew, JP(died 28 March 1586, aged 68), of Haccombe.
- Sir Bernard Drake, JP, (died 10 April 1586) of Ash, Musbury.
- John Fortescue, JP
- John Waldron, JP; given by Wyote (see below) as Mr Welrond. The only Devonshire gentry family listed in the Heraldic Visitation of Devon similar to this name is Walrond of Bradfield, Uffculme, Devon. Humphry II Walrond of Bradfield and his second son Thomas Walrond were both buried on 7 April 1586 at Uffculme. Humphry II Walrond had legal connections, having married the daughter of Sir Thomas Willoughby, a Justice of the Common Pleas.
- Thomas Risdon, JP (died 2 April 1586) of Bableigh, Parkham, twice reader of Inner Temple.

== Descriptions ==
An historical account written by Alexander Jenkins (1841) stated "A noisome and pestilential smell came from the prisoners who were araigned at the crown bar which so affected the people present that many were seized with a violent sickness which proved mortal to the greatest part of them".

=== Contemporary accounts ===
==== By John Hooker ====
The best contemporary account of the outbreak is by John Hooker (c.1527–1601), published in Holinshead's Chronicle (1587). He suggests three possible causes:

- Firstly due to the "close aire and filthie stinke" of Exeter Prison, which infected the prisoners.
- Secondly that the disease originated from 38 Portuguese fishermen returning fully loaded with fish from Newfoundland whose vessel was captured by Sir Bernard Drake (c.1537–1586) and landed at Dartmouth in Devon and transferred to the "dark pit and stinking dungeon" of Exeter Prison. The Portuguese had been forced to wait in the jail for a long period until the time of the assize for their judgement, at which time those who were still alive were so weak and thin that they had to be carried into the courtroom. The Chief Justice was shocked at their terrible condition, which was then attributed to lack of proper feeding, and made orders for future improvements, but it was too late as the disease had by then spread to the courtroom, to the judges and local people in attendance, and infected the population of the West country for many months after.

==== By Adam Wyote ====
Adam Wyote (or Wyatt) was town clerk of Barnstaple in North Devon and kept a personal journal from 1586 to 1611. The first entry records the Black Assize of Exeter, and lists the names of eight of the gentry of Devon who died from "gaoll sickness" as follows: "to wit one of the Justices of Assize, Mr Flowerdewe, Sir Barnard Drak, Mr Welrond, Mr Cary of Clovelly, Mr Cary (sic, should be "Carew") of Hackome, Mr Fortescue, Mr Rysdon, Justices of the Peace, Sir John Chichester".

== 1700s ==
Outbreaks of Gaol Fever were still common in the 1750s. Two judges and the Lord Mayor died from the affliction in 1750, and there was another outbreak in 1772.

== Sources ==
- Cockburn, J.S., History of English Assizes 1558–1714, Cambridge, 1972
- Creighton, Charles, History of Epidemics in Britain, Part 1, 2013, pp. 383–388, Exeter Assizes 1586
- Jenkins, Alexander, Civil and Ecclesiastical History of the City of Exeter and its Environs, 2nd edition, Exeter, 1841, p. 125
- Vivian, Lt.Col. J.L., (Ed.) The Visitations of the County of Devon: Comprising the Heralds' Visitations of 1531, 1564 & 1620, Exeter, 1895
