= Ash, Musbury =

Historic estate in Devon, England

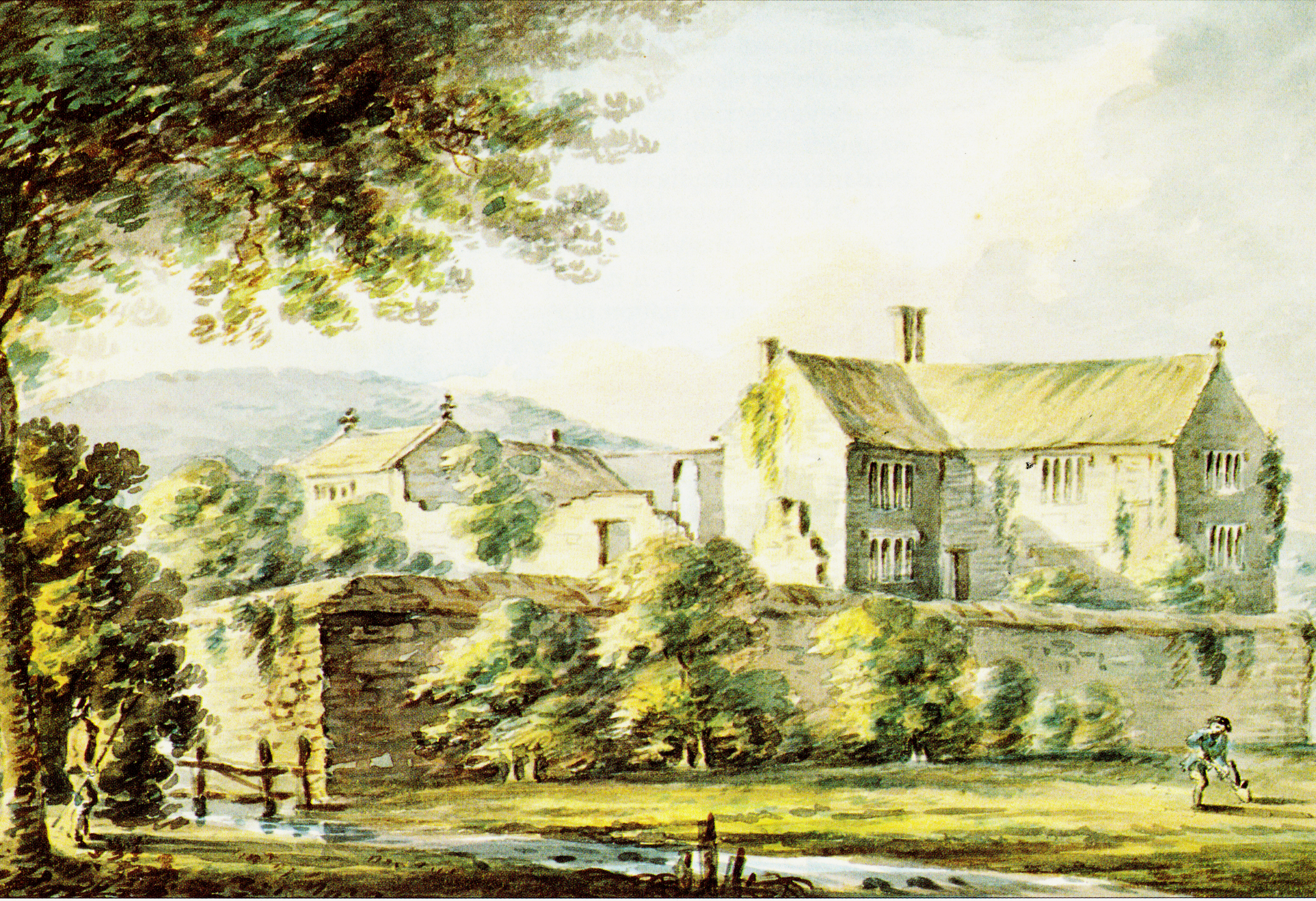
"Ash, antient seat of the Drakes", watercolour dated 13 February 1795 by Rev. John Swete (1752–1821) of Oxton House, Devon. Devon Record Office 564M/F7/129. It was then in use as a farmhouse. This is the house re-built by Sir John Drake, 2nd Baronet (1647–1684) after its near destruction during the Civil War. The building at left is a chapel

Ash in the parish of Musbury in the county of Devon is an historic estate, long the residence of the ancient Drake family, the heir of which remarkably was always called John, only one excepted, for ten generations. It was formerly believed to have been the birthplace of John Churchill, 1st Duke of Marlborough (1650–1722), whose mother was Elizabeth Drake, but was in fact probably in ruins at the time of his birth. The future Duke was however baptised in 1650 in the Chapel at Ash, which had been licensed by the Bishop of Exeter in 1387. Ash was "burnt and demolished" during the Civil War and "lay long in ruins" during which time the family moved one mile away to Trill, Axminster. John Drake (1625–1669), the wartime occupant who had suffered so greatly for the Royalist cause received some recompense at the end of the troubles by being created a baronet by King Charles II on the Restoration of the Monarchy in 1660. Ash was rebuilt "to a greater perfection than it was of before" by Sir John Drake, 2nd Baronet (1647–1684). The last in the male line was Sir William Drake, 6th Baronet (ca. 1695–1733), who died without children and bequeathed all his estates to his widow Anne Williams (died 1793), who remarried to George Speke, MP, and had by him a daughter Anne Speke (before 1741–1797), who brought the Drake estates, including Ash and the advowson of Musbury, to her husband Frederick North, 2nd Earl of Guilford (1732–1792), who sold them piece-meal to various persons. Ash House survives today as a grade II* listed private residence in much the same form as depicted by Swete in 1795.

The Drake family of Ash rejected a claim by Admiral Sir Francis Drake (c. 1540 – 1596) of Buckland Abbey, whom they considered to be below the rank of gentry, that he was descended from their ancient Drake family of Ash, and a famous physical confrontation broke out in the court of Queen Elizabeth I between Admiral Sir Bernard Drake (c. 1537 – 1586) of Ash and Admiral Sir Francis Drake of Buckland Abbey when the latter made claim to the armorials of Drake of Ash.

== Descent ==
The estate of Ash was a member of the manor of Musbury, itself a member of the feudal barony of Okehampton, the lords of which from about 1190 were the Courtenay family, later Earls of Devon. The descent of the estate of Ash was as follows:

=== de Ash ===
- Quardus de Ash is the earliest holder of Ash according to Pole (died 1635), from the Courtenay overlords.
- Henry de Esse (a common variant of "de Ash"), whose relationship to the foregoing holder Quardus is unknown, was granted the estate by "John, Lord Courtenay", according to Pole.

=== Orwey ===
- John de Orwey, of Orwey in the parish of Kentisbeare, Devon, whose wife was Juliana de Esse, heiress of Ash, having been given it by Henry de Esse. The arms of Orwey of Orwey and Ash were: Argent, on a chief indented sable three crosslets fitchee or. The arms Ermine, on a chief indented sable three crosslets fitchee or are shown in the 4th quarter of the escutcheon in the oil painting of Richard Drake (1535–1603) by George Gower (1540–1596) in the National Maritime Museum, Greenwich.
- Thomas de Orwey (son)
- John de Orwey (son), who died without children.

=== Strech ===
- John Strech, husband of Jone de Orwey, sister and co-heiress (with her sister Phillipa de Orwey, wife of Warren (alias Warin) Hampton) of John de Orwey The arms of Strech of Ash were: Argent, a bend engrailed sable between three martlets gules.
- John Strech, son, who died without children

=== Hampton ===
- Warin Hampton, son of Phillipa de Orwey, wife of Warren (alias Warin) Hampton. He died without male issue and left two daughters as his co-heiresses, Jone and Alis. The arms of Hamton of Rockbere and Ash were: Gules, on a fess argent two mullets sable. These are shown in the 3rd quarter of the escutcheon in the oil painting of Richard Drake (1535–1603) by George Gower (1540–1596) in the National Maritime Museum, Greenwich.

=== Billet ===
- John Billet, wife of Alis Hampton, who on the allocation of her father's estates received Ash. The arms of Billet of Ash were: Argent, on a chief gules three cinquefoils of the first. He died without sons leaving a daughter Christiana Billet as his sole heiress. Christiana Billet married twice, firstly to John Drake (by whom she had a son John Drake), secondly to Richard Francheney (by whom she had a son Christopher Francheney).

=== Francheney ===
- Christopher Francheney, who held Ash after the death of his parents. The arms of Frankcheyney of Clist Gerard were: Ermine, on a chief gules three lions rampant argent.
- Symon Francheney, son, the legality of whose tenure of Ash was challenged in a suit of Formedon by John Drake of Exmouth, fourth in descent from John Drake and his wife Christiana Billet.

=== Drake ===
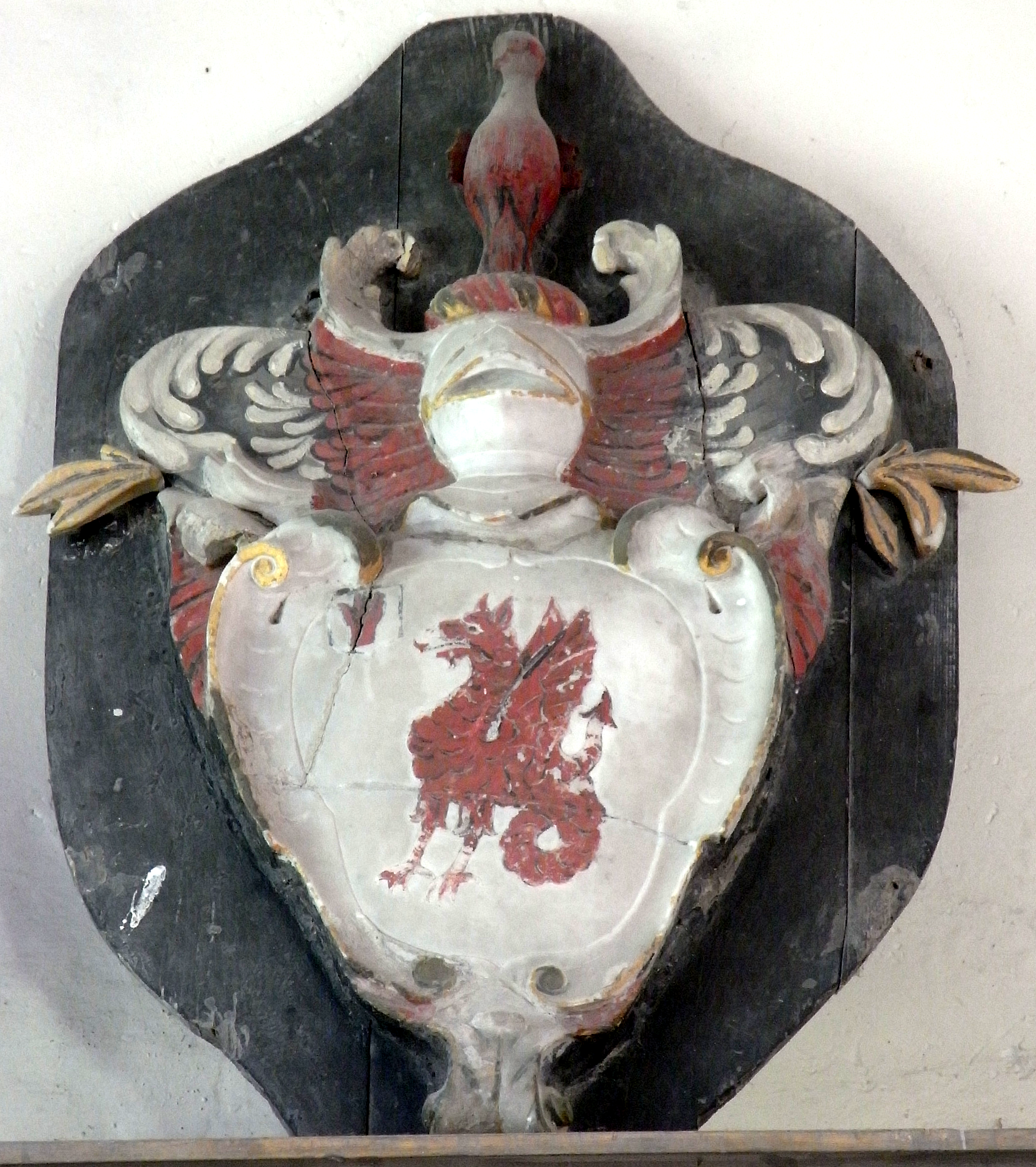
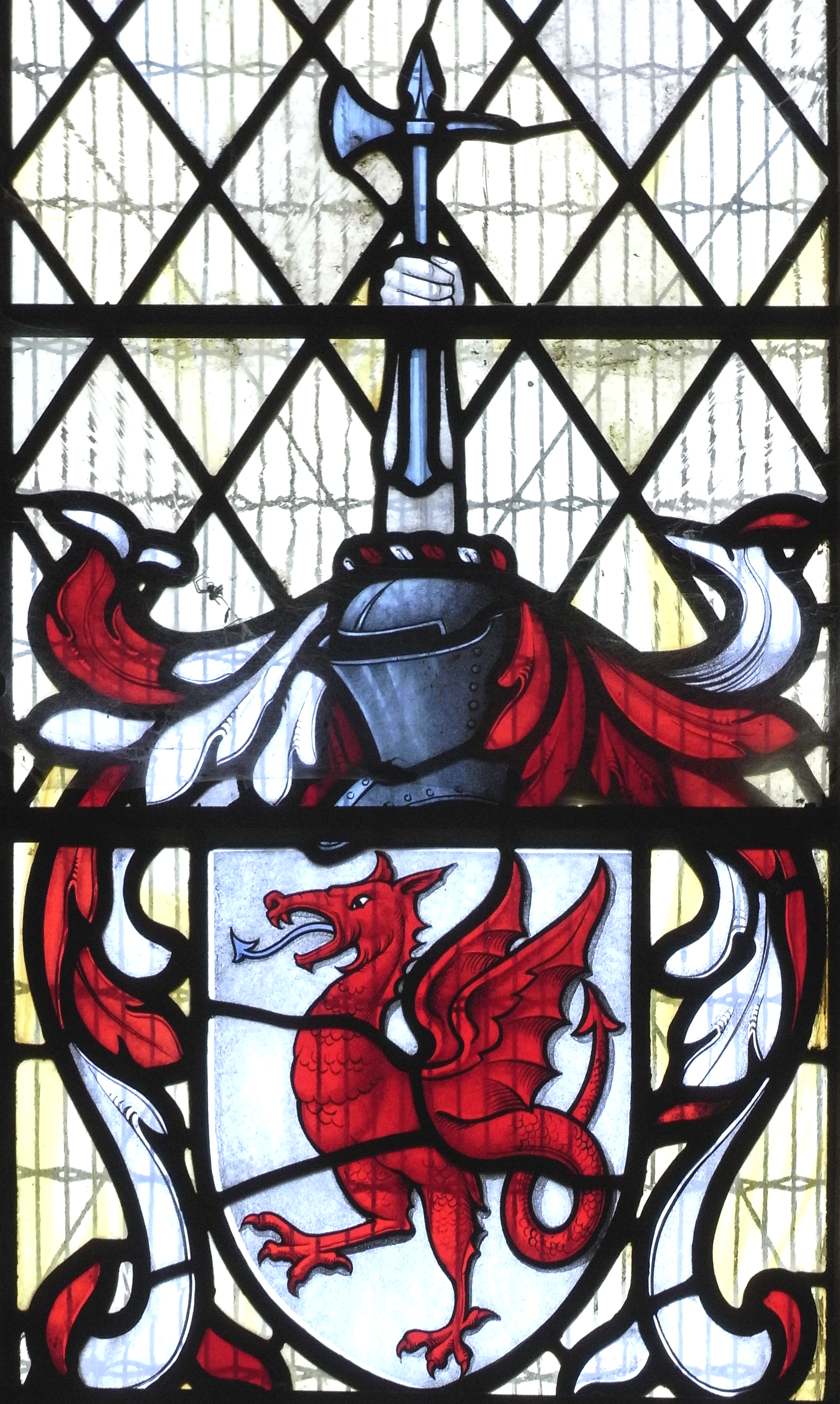
Canting arms of Drake (from Latinized form Draco, "a dragon") of Ash: Argent, a wyvern wings displayed and tail nowed gules. Left: Detail from top of 1611 monument in Musbury Church; right 19th century stained glass, Musbury Church, showing crest: A dexter cubit arm couped at the elbow proper holding a battle-axe sable The Drake motto is: Aquila non captat muscas ("The eagle does not catch flies"). The Drake wyvern gules was adopted by John Churchill, 1st Duke of Marlborough for both his heraldic supporters, in recognition of his maternal descent from the Drakes of Ash

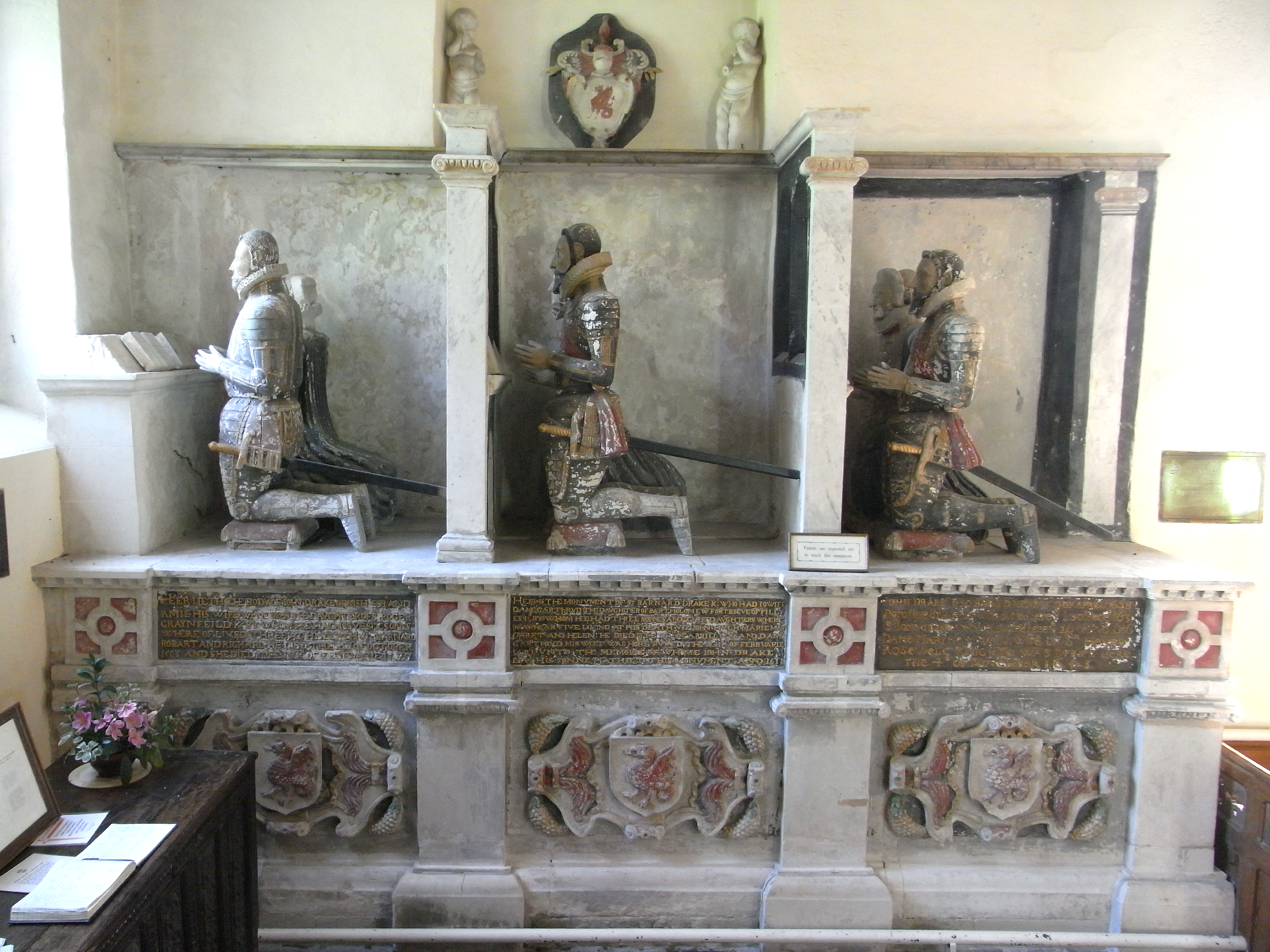
Monument to the Drake family of Ash, south aisle of Musbury Church. It depicts the following persons: left: John Drake (died 1558), with his wife Amy Grenville (died 1577); centre: Admiral Sir Bernard Drake (c. 1537 – 1586), his son, with his wife Gertrude Fortescue (died 1601); right: John Drake (died 1628), who erected the monument in 1611, son of Sir Bernard, with his wife Dorothy Button (died 1631). Also shown four times are the arms of Drake: Argent, a wyvern wings displayed and tail nowed gules. Gilded inscribed biographical tablets appear under each couple of kneeling figures

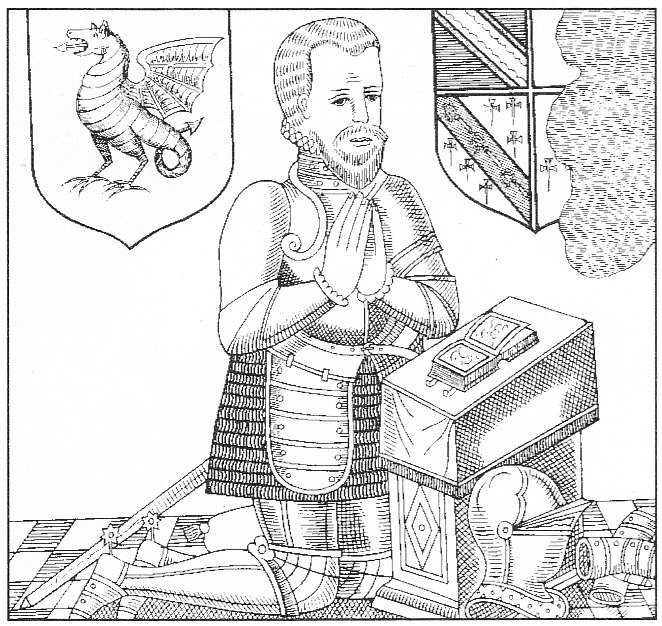
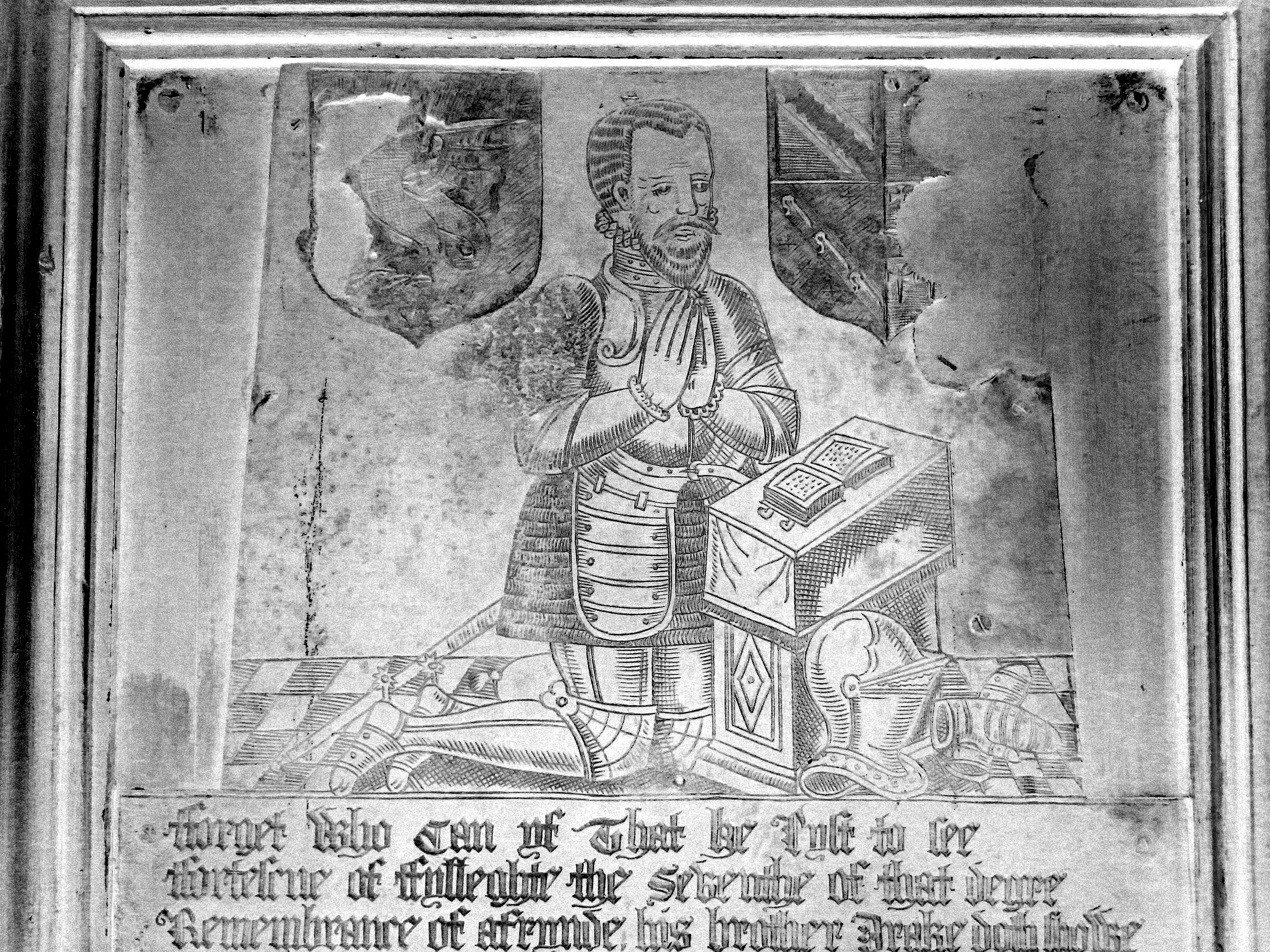
Right: Monumental brass in Filleigh Church, North Devon, depicting Sir Bernard Drake (died 1586), who erected the monument to which it was originally affixed in memory of his brother-in-law, Richard Fortescue (died 1570). The arms of Drake of Ash are shown in the dexter escutcheon, in a mutilated condition: Argent, a wyvern wings displayed and tail nowed gules. The sinister escutcheon shows the quarterings of the arms of Drake's wife, Gertrude Fortescue. Left drawing of reconstructed brass

The earliest record of the Drake family of Devon is in an undated "very old deed" in Latin quoted by Westcote to have been witnessed by "Walterus Draco" and "Wymondus de Dennex" and others. Thus Draco (from Greek δράκων (drakon)) was the Latinized form of the name "Drake", meaning in Latin "dragon", referred to in the family's canting arms of a wyvern displayed gules.

- John Drake of Axmouth, 2 1/2 miles south-west of Ash, son and heir of John Drake of Otterton (13 miles south-west of Ash) by his wife Agnes Kelloway. He was called by Risdon (died 1640) "A man of very great estate". He recovered Ash from Symon Francheney by exercise of a writ of Formedon, a writ of right for claiming entailed property. he married Margaret Cole, daughter of John Cole.
- John Drake (died 1558) (eldest son and heir), who married Amy Grenville (died 1578), a daughter of Roger Grenville (1477–1524), lord of the manors of Stowe, Kilkhampton in Cornwall and of Bideford in Devon. The tablet under his effigy in Musbury Church is inscribed thus:

Heer lieth the body of John Drake of Aish Esq.r and Amie his wife whoe was the daughter of Sr Roger Graynfeild Kt. by whom hee had issue six sones where of lived three at his death viz Barnard, Robart and Richard. He died the 4th of October 1558 and she died the 18th of Februarie 1577

His third son as mentioned above was Richard Drake (1535–1603) of Esher, MP, an Equerry of the Stable and Groom of the Privy Chamber to Queen Elizabeth I.

- Admiral Sir Bernard Drake (c. 1537 – 1586), eldest son and heir. The only Drake heir of Ash in ten generations not to bear the name John. He is said by Prince "greatly to have exhausted his estate", but for a noble cause "for the honor and safety of his country" and "in the discovery of foreign regions, and such other vertuous achievements as purchase glory and renown". He was "a person of high spirit" who stood up to the great Admiral Sir Francis Drake, of no provable family relationship to himself, when he tried to usurp the armorials of Drake of Ash, and in the royal court of Queen Elizabeth I gave him "a box on the ear", "for which offence he incurred her Majesty's displeasure". Sir Francis thereupon was awarded by the Queen his own coat of arms to a new design, to which Sir Bernard replied "that though her Majesty could give him a nobler, yet she could not give an antienter coat than his". Sir Francis however had the last laugh. A small detail in his new crest was a tiny image of the Drake of Ash wyvern gules hung up by the heels (sic) from the rigging of a ship. He died at Ash having struggled to return home very sick from jail fever he had contracted whilst serving as a magistrate at the Black Assize of Exeter (1586), which claimed the lives of several other magistrates and occupants of the infected court house. The foreign prisoners who were the source of the infection had by co-incidence been captured at sea by Sir Bernard himself. He married Gertrude Fortescue (died 1601), daughter of Bartholomew Fortescue of Filleigh, North Devon, and sister of Richard Fortescue (died 1570) (ancestor of Earl Fortescue of Castle Hill, Filleigh) in memory of the latter of whom he erected a monumental brass showing his own portrait and arms in Filleigh Church. The tablet under his effigy in Musbury Church is inscribed thus:

Heer is the monument of Sr Barnard Drake Kt. who had to wife Dame Garthrud the daughter of Bartholomew Fortescue of Filly Esqr. by whom hee had three sonnes and thre daughters where of whear five living at his death viz John, Hugh, Marie, Margaret and Helen. He died the Xth of April 1586 and Dame Garthrud his wief was here bured the XIIth of Februarie 1601 unto the memorie of whome John Drake Esqr. his sonne hath set this monument Anno 1611

- John Drake (died 1628), son and heir, who married Dorothy Button, daughter of William Button of Aston, Wiltshire. The tablet under his effigy in Musbury Church is inscribed thus:

John Drake Esq buried here ye II of Aprill 1628. Dorothye Drake his wife buried here ye 13 of Dece.r. 1631. Sr John Drake Knighte buried here ye 26 of Aug 1636. Dame Mary Rosewell wife of Sr Henry Rosewell Knighte was buried here the 4^{o} of November 1643 (Mary Rosewell was the sister of John Drake (died 1636))

- Sir John Drake (died 1636), who married Elinor Boteler (died 1666, buried in Holyrood Church, Southampton), daughter and co-heiress of John Boteler, 1st Baron Boteler of Brantfield, (c. 1566 – 1637). Their 4th daughter Elizabeth Drake married Sir Winston Churchill (1620–1688) of Glanville Wotton in Dorset and was mother of John Churchill, 1st Duke of Marlborough (1650–1722), born at Ash (see below).
- Sir John Drake, 1st Baronet (1625–1669), created a baronet on the Restoration of the Monarchy in 1660. He had suffered much for the Royalist cause during the Civil War. His sister Elizabeth Drake married Sir Winston Churchill (1620–1688) of Glanville Wotton in Dorset and was mother of John Churchill, 1st Duke of Marlborough (1650–1722), who on account of the Churchill residence having been destroyed during the Civil War, and the Churchill family having been heavily fined for its Royalist support, was born at Ash, his mother's family home. Ash too was shortly thereafter "burnt and demolished" by Parliamentarian troops, and "lay long in ruins" during which time the family moved one mile away to Trill. The Duke's early childhood was thus spent in comparative poverty.
- Sir John Drake, 2nd Baronet (1647–1684), son. In the words of Prince he "enlarged and beautified" Ash "to a greater perfection than it was of before, enclosed a park adjoyning to the house with a good wall; made fish ponds, walks, gardens well furnished with great variety of choice fruits etc., so that now it may vye, for beauty and delight, with most other seats in those parts" Having lived for a long time beneath his station in a tenant's house on the estate, he was happy again to reside at "this sweet and pleasant place which with so much care and cost he had finished", but died soon after. He had argued with his next half-brother and heir apparent Bernard Drake (?-1687), the future 3rd Baronet, (eldest son of his father by his second wife Dionis Strode, 8th daughter of Sir Richard Strode (1584–1669), MP, of Newnham, elder brother of William Strode (1594–1645), MP, one of the Five Members whose attempted unconstitutional arrest by King James I in the House House of Commons sparked the Civil War) whom "having very highly disoblig'd him by an indigestible extravagance" he cut-off from the entail on the family estates which thus prevented him from inheriting. Sir Bernard thus never owned Ash and lived instead at Herebeare in Bickington.
- Sir William Drake, 4th Baronet (1658–1716), younger son The 2nd Baronet had died having broken the entail, but without having reassigned it as he had intended onto his youngest half-brother William Drake, the future 4th Baronet, and thus on his death was effectively intestate. His heir at law was his sister Elizabeth Drake (1648–1694), who in the words of Prince "to her immortal honor" and generosity re-settled the estates as her brother had wished onto William.
- Sir John Drake, 5th Baronet (ca. 1689–1724), son
- Sir William Drake, 6th Baronet (ca. 1695–1733), younger son Last in the male line, on whose death the Drake Baronetcy became extinct. He bequeathed all his estates including Ash to his wife Anne Williams (died 1793), daughter of William Peere Williams, MP.

=== Speke and North ===
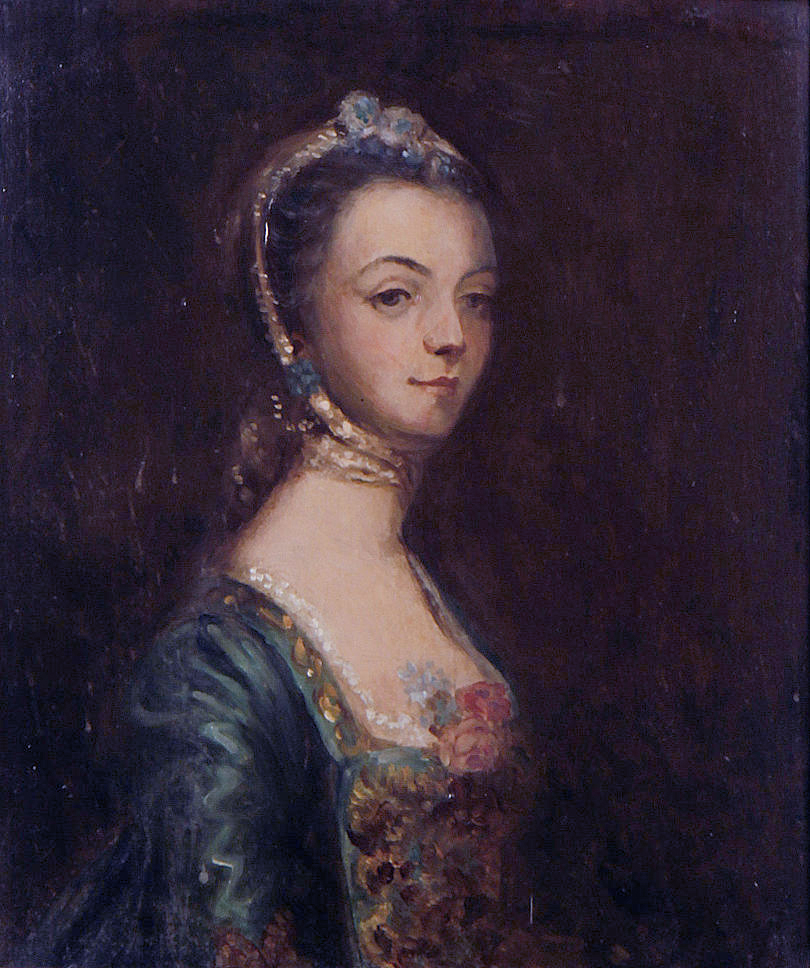
Anne Speke (before 1741–1797), heiress of Ash, whose husband Frederick North, 2nd Earl of Guilford (1732–1792) disposed of the Drake estates piece-meal. Portrait after Sir Joshua Reynolds (1723–1792)

The last in the male line was Sir William Drake, 6th Baronet (ca. 1695–1733), who died without children and bequeathed all his estates to his widow Anne Williams (died 1793), who remarried to George Speke, MP, of Whitelackington in Somerset, and had by him a daughter Anne Speke (before 1741–1797), who brought the Drake estates, including Ash and the advowson of Musbury, to her husband Frederick North, 2nd Earl of Guilford (1732–1792), who sold them piece-meal to various persons.

== Ash in 1795 ==
Rev John Swete (died 1821) of Oxton House, Kenton in Devon, the Devon topographer and arbiter of landscape gardening, visited Ash on 13 February 1795, as part of one of his tours around the county. His watercolour painting of the house and corresponding journal entry survives, in the Devon Record Office. He was familiar with Prince's text and noted that the door and windows of the chapel were then blocked up and in contrast to Prince's description wrote:

"We find all its beauty passed away - the park destroy'd, the ponds filled up - except in one long parallelogram at the entrance, and the garden more abundant in weed than flowers or choice fruit."

== Sources ==
- Gray, Todd & Rowe, Margery (Eds.), Travels in Georgian Devon: The Illustrated Journals of The Reverend John Swete, 1789-1800, 4 vols., Tiverton, 1999, vol.2, pp. 121–2
- Vivian, Lt.Col. J.L., (Ed.) The Visitations of the County of Devon: Comprising the Heralds' Visitations of 1531, 1564 & 1620, Exeter, 1895, pp. 292–8, pedigree of Drake of Ash
- Risdon, Tristram (died 1640), Survey of Devon, 1811 edition, London, 1811, with 1810 Additions, p. 24
- Pole, Sir William (died 1635), Collections Towards a Description of the County of Devon, Sir John-William de la Pole (ed.), London, 1791, pp. 122–3
- Pevsner, Nikolaus & Cherry, Bridget, The Buildings of England: Devon, London, 2004, p. 135 "Ashe House"
- Prince, John, (1643–1723) The Worthies of Devon, 1810 edition, London, pp. 328–332, biography of Drake, Sir Bernard, Knight (Prince's step-mother Jane Drake was a third cousin of the Drakes of Ash and he was a godson to Sir John Drake, 1st Baronet (died 1669)). John Prince had a family connection to his great contemporary John Churchill, 1st Duke of Marlborough (1650–1722). Prince's father Bernard Prince had married secondly (as her second husband) to Jane Drake, (Vivian, p. 296) a daughter of Philip Drake of Salcombe, third in descent from John Drake of Axmouth, father of John Drake (died 1558) of Ash, in the parish of Musbury. Jane was thus 3rd cousin of Sir John Drake (died 1636) of Ash, the father of Sir John Drake, 1st Baronet (died 1669), whose sister was Elizabeth Drake, mother of John Churchill, 1st Duke of Marlborough (1650–1722).(Vivian, pp. 292–297) Sir John Drake, 1st Baronet (died 1669) was John Prince's godfather,(Courtney, William Prideaux Courtney, biography of Prince, John (1643–1723), published in Dictionary of National Biography, London, 1885-1900, Volume 46, quoting: "Worseley, John, Duke of Marlborough, i. 2–6") and one of Prince's Worthies was Sir Bernard Drake (died 1586) of Ash, son of John Drake (died 1558).
