= Musbury Castle =

Iron Age hill fort in East Devon, England

Coordinates: 50.741949°N 3.017°W

Map showing the location of Musbury Castle within Devon
(grid reference SY282941)

Musbury Castle is an Iron Age Hill fort situated above the Village of Musbury in Devon. The fort occupies a commanding hill top approx 175 metres (575 ft) above sea level overlooking the Axe valley at Ordnance Survey grid reference SY282941.

== Gallery ==
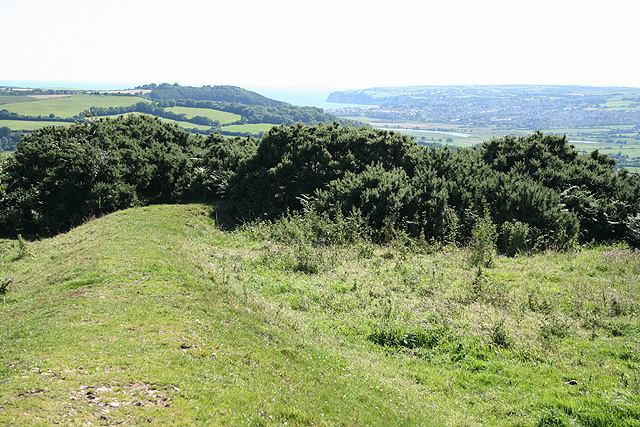
Part of the fort and the view to Seaton on the South Devon coast.

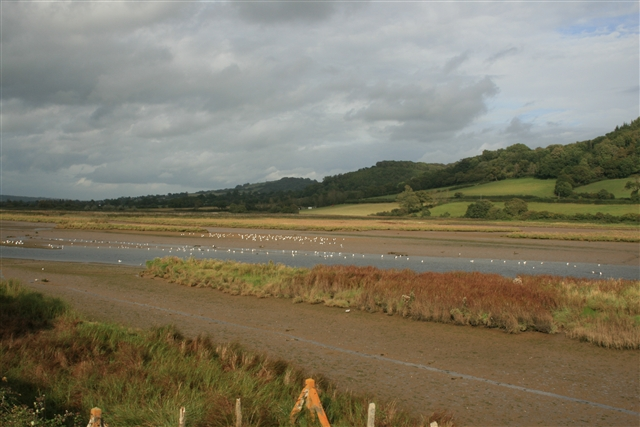
Musbury Castle on the left of three hills viewed from the estuary of the river Axe
