= Robert Carey (died 1586) =

English Member of Parliament

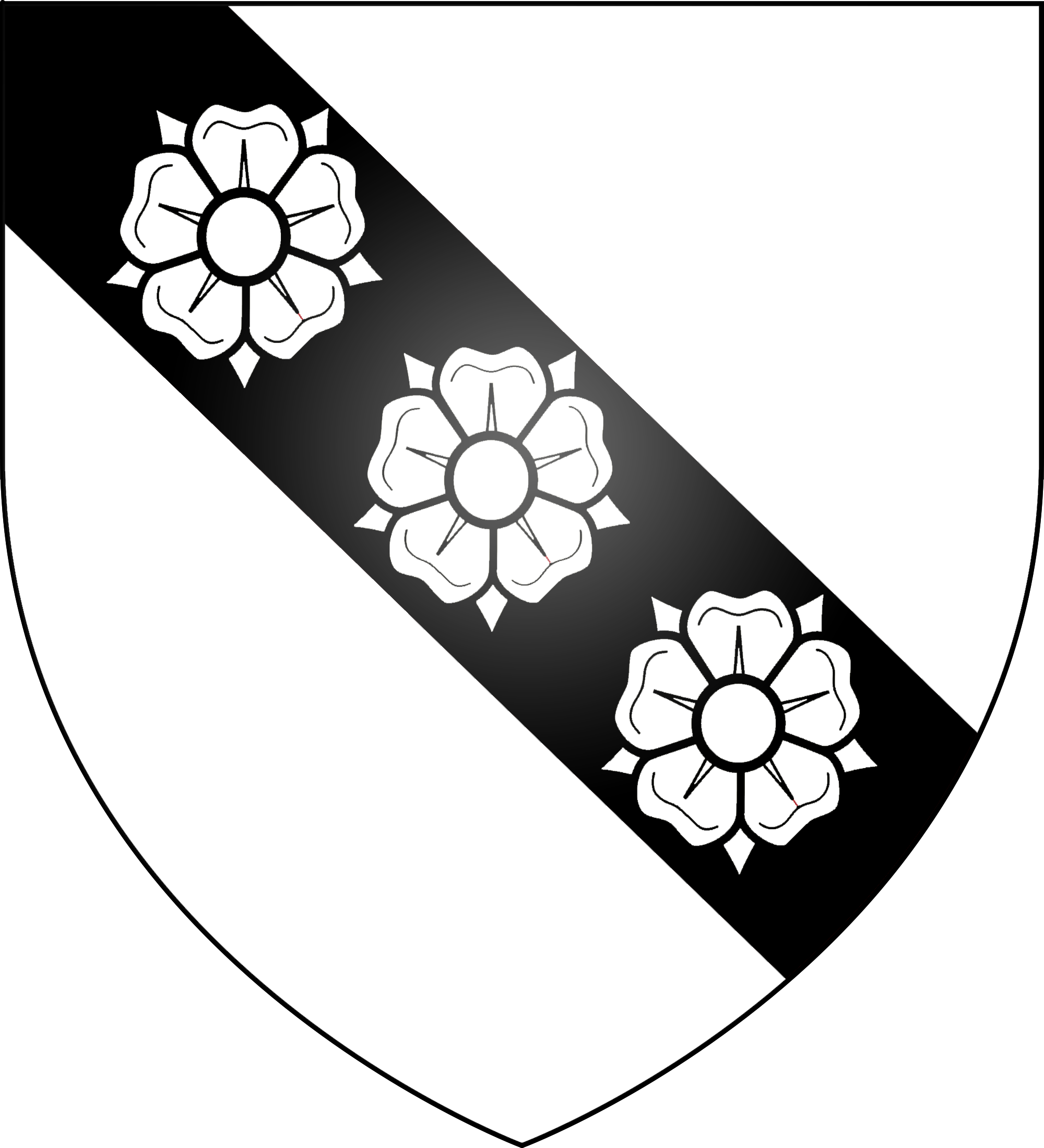
Arms of Cary: Argent, on a bend sable three roses of the field

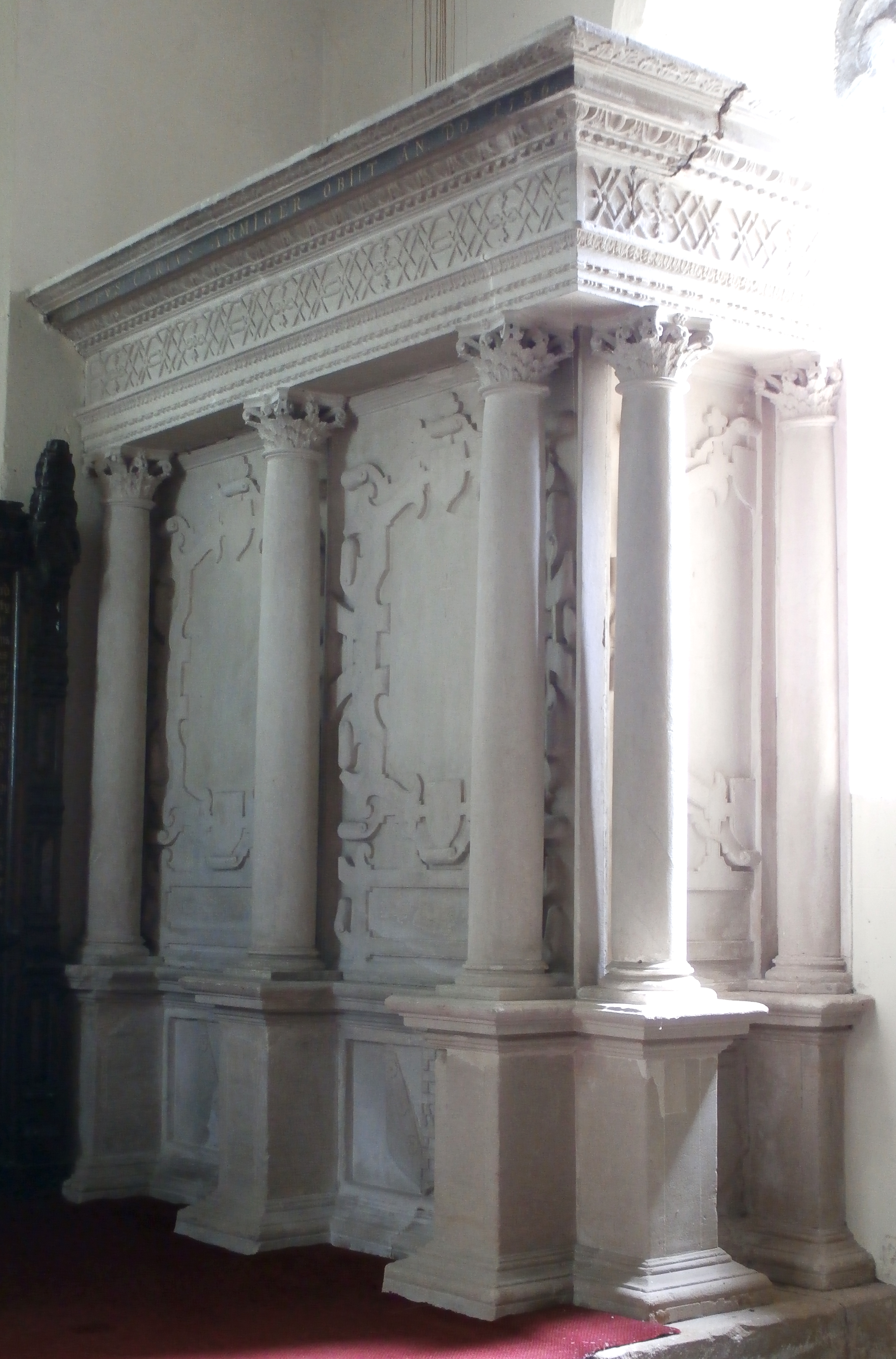
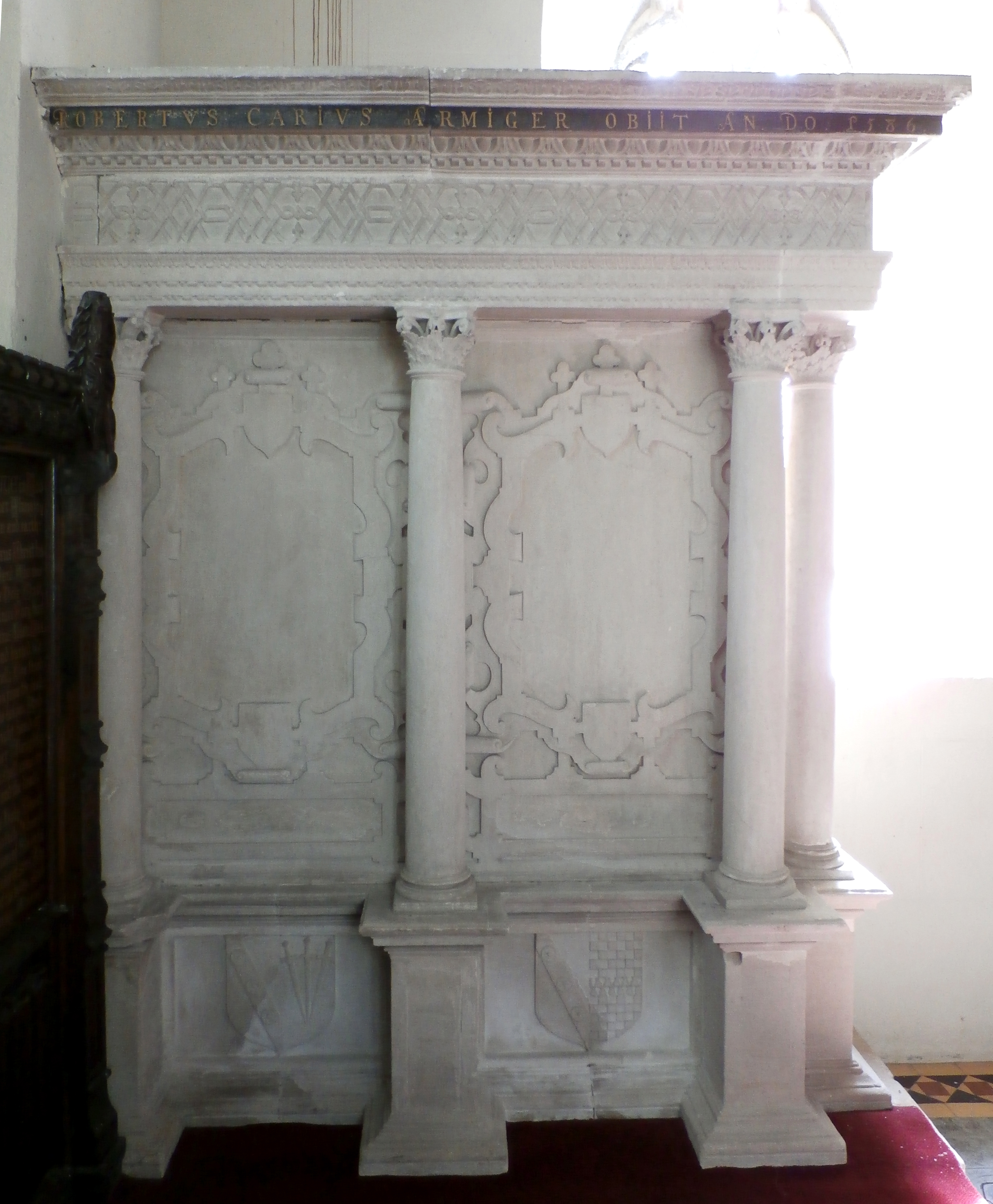
Monument to Robert Cary. South wall of chancel, All Saints Church, Clovelly

Robert Carey (c. 1515 – 1586), lord of the manor of Clovelly in North Devon, was Member of Parliament for Barnstaple, Devon, in October 1553 and served as Sheriff of Devon in 1555–56. He served as Recorder of Barnstaple after 1560. Along with several other members of the Devonshire gentry then serving as magistrates he died of gaol fever at the Black Assize of Exeter 1587. His large monument survives in Clovelly Church.

== Origins ==
He was the fourth son of Robert Cary (died 1540), of Cockington and Clovelly, by his third wife Margaret Fulkeram (died 1547), daughter and heiress of William Fulkeram of Dartmouth, Devon. He was given the manor of Clovelly by his father. He was the first Cary to be seated exclusively at Clovelly, the manors of Cary and Cockington having been inherited by his half-brothers.

== Career ==
He was a Justice of the Peace for Devon from 1547 until his death. He served as Sheriff of Devon in 1555–56. He was elected a Member of Parliament for Barnstaple in October 1553 and served as Recorder of Barnstaple after 1560.

== Marriage and children ==
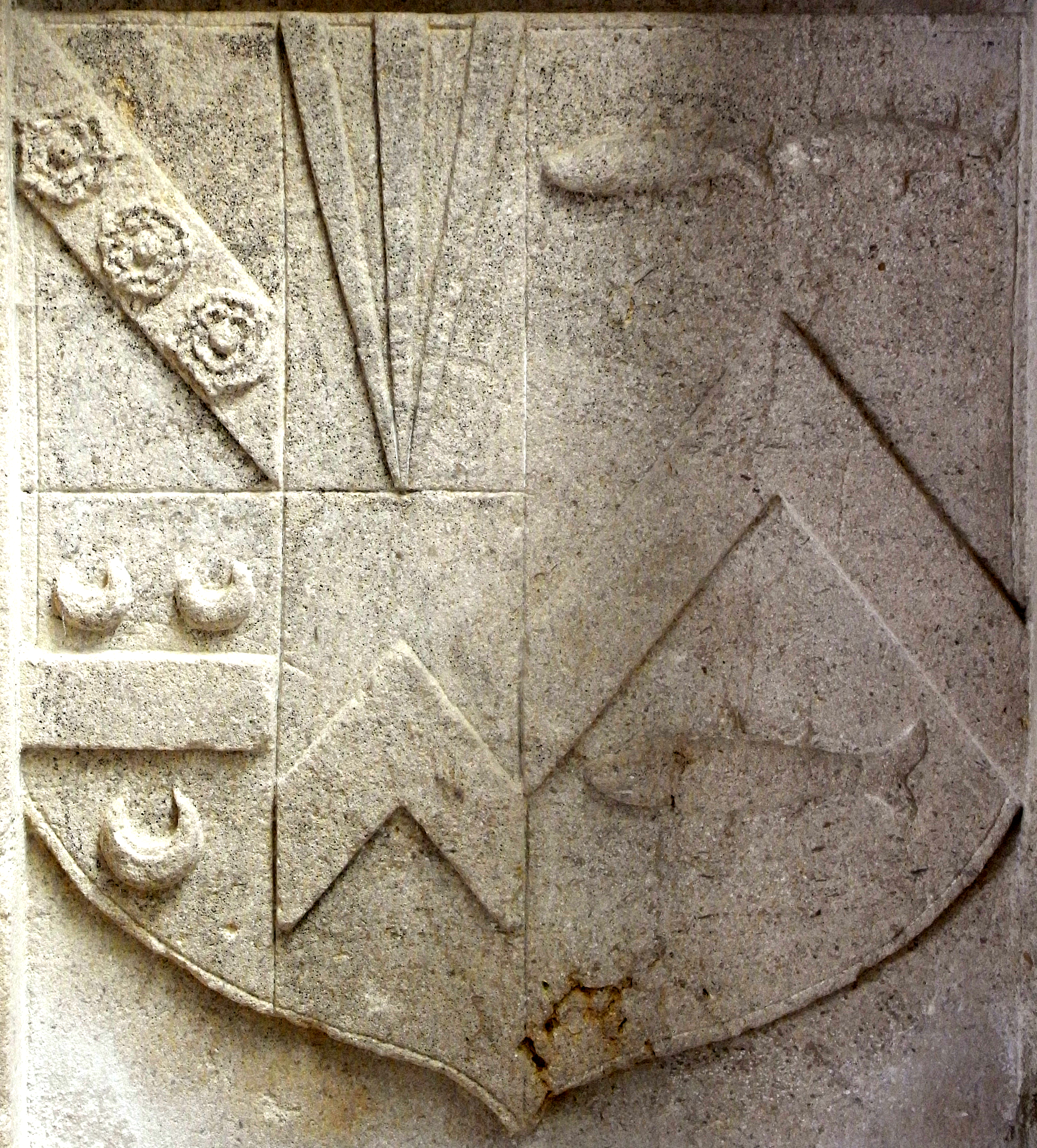
Escutcheon on monument to Robert Cary in Clovelly Church showing arms of Cary (of four quarters) impaling Milliton: Gules, a chevron or between three millets hauriant argent

He married Margaret Milliton, daughter of John Milliton and widow of John Giffard of Yeo in the parish of Alwington, North Devon, by whom he had six sons and three daughters including George (1543–1601), eldest son and heir, Sheriff of Devon in 1587, who built a harbour wall at Clovelly, which created the only safe anchorage between Appledore and Boscastle.

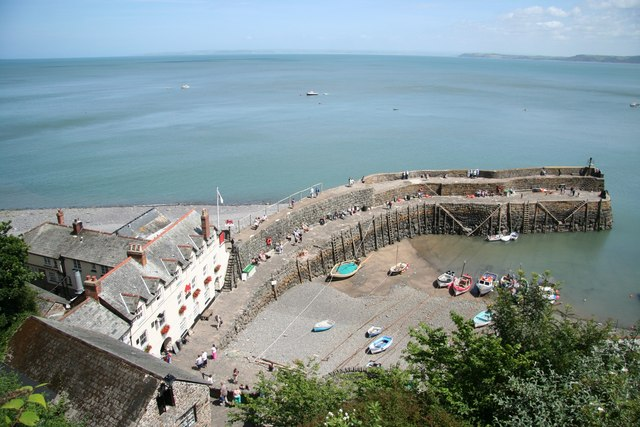
The "Pile" or harbour wall at Clovelly built by Cary's son, George

== Death and burial ==
Along with several other members of the Devonshire gentry then serving as magistrates he died of gaol fever at the Black Assize of Exeter 1586.

== Monument at Clovelly ==
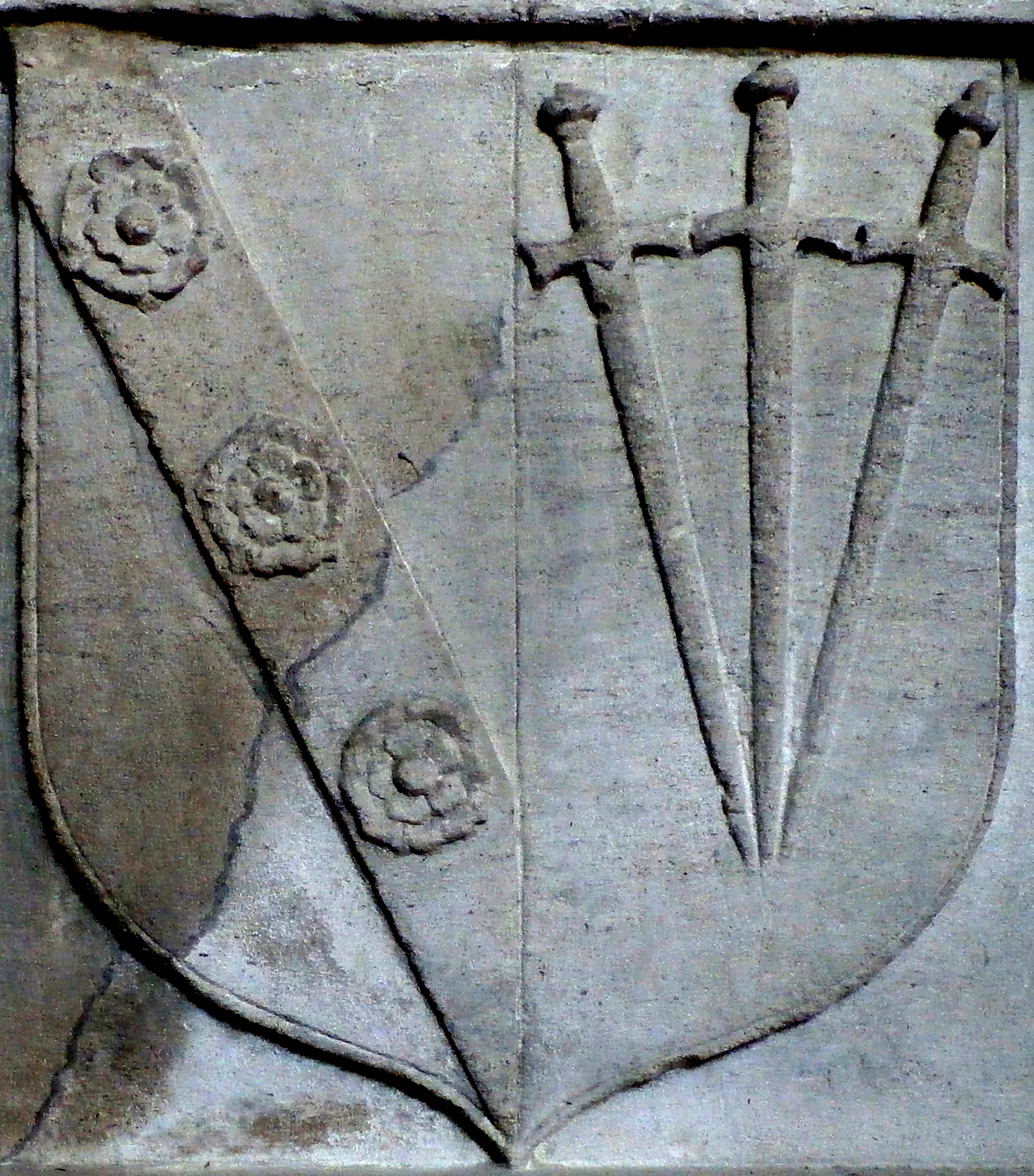
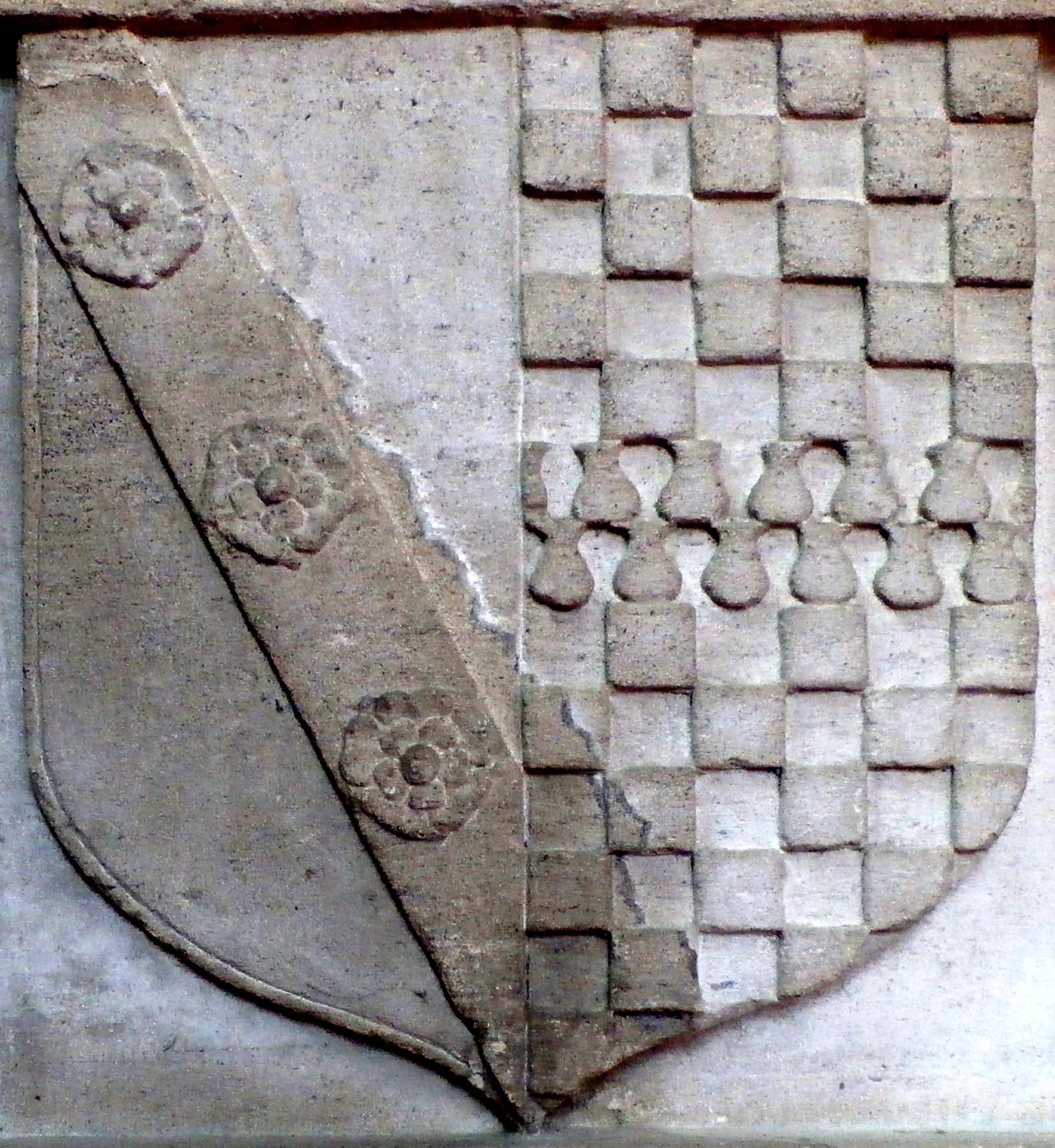
Escutcheons on the north side of the base of the monument to Robert Cary in Clovelly Church: left: Cary impaling Sable, three swords pilewise points in base proper pommels and hilts or (Poulett, for his grandfather Sir William Cary (1437–1471), of Cockington, who married Elizabeth Poulett, a daughter of Sir William Poulett of Hinton St George, Somerset (ancestor of Earl Poulett)); right: Cary impaling Chequy argent and sable, a fess vairy argent and gules (Fulkeram, for his father Robert Cary (died 1540), of Cockington and Clovelly, who married Margaret Fulkeram (died 1547), daughter and heiress of William Fulkeram of Dartmouth, Devon)

His large monument, with strapwork decoration, survives against the south wall of the chancel of All Saints Church, Clovelly. Along the full length of the cornice is inscribed in gilt capitals: Robertus Carius, Armiger, obiit An(no) Do(mini) 1586 ("Robert Cary, Esquire, died in the year of Our Lord 1586"). On the base of the north side are shown two relief sculpted heraldic escutcheons, showing Cary impaling Chequy argent and sable, a fess vairy argent and gules (Fulkeram, for his father) and Cary impaling Sable, three swords pilewise points in base proper pomels and hilts or (Poulett, for his grandfather). On the base of the west side is a similar escutcheon showing his own arms of Cary (of four quarters, 1st: Cary; 2nd: Or, three piles in point azure (Bryan); 3rd: Gules, a fess between three crescents argent (Holleway); 4th: A chevron (unknown, possibly Hankford: Sable, a chevron barry nebuly argent and gules) impaling Gules, a chevron or between three millets hauriant argent (Milliton, canting arms, a "millet" in heraldry being a type of fish, possibly a mullet))

== Sources ==
- Griggs, William, A Guide to All Saints Church, Clovelly, first published 1980, revised version 2010.
- Hawkyard, A.D.K., biography of Carey, Robert (c.1515-87), of Clovelly and Exeter, Devon , published in History of Parliament: House of Commons 1509-1558, ed. S.T. Bindoff, 1982
- Pole, Sir William (died 1635), Collections Towards a Description of the County of Devon, Sir John-William de la Pole (ed.), London, 1791.
- Risdon, Tristram (died 1640), Survey of Devon. With considerable additions. London, 1811.
- Vivian, Lt.Col. J.L., (Ed.) The Visitations of the County of Devon: Comprising the Heralds' Visitations of 1531, 1564 & 1620. Exeter, 1895.
