= Edward Flowerdew =

Member of the Parliament of England

Edward Flowerdew (died 1586), was an English judge and Member of Parliament (MP).

== Life ==
Flowerdew was the fourth son of John Flowerdew of Hethersett, Norfolk, and Katherine, daughter of William Sheres. He was educated at Cambridge, but took no degree. He became a member of the Inner Temple 11 October 1552, and in the autumn of 1569 and Lent of 1577 was reader, and in 1579 treasurer. He obtained considerable celebrity as a lawyer in his own county.

In 1571 Flowerdew became counsel to the dean and chapter of Norwich, and in 1573 to the town of Great Yarmouth. He was counsel also to Thomas Gresham. The town of Norwich gave him a silver cup in 1571, presumably for professional services, and various grateful clients settled annuities on him, Thomas Grimesdiche settling 40s. and John Thornton 26s. 8d. in 1573, and Simon Harcourt of Stanton Harcourt, Oxfordshire, one third of five marks in 1575.

Flowerdew was elected as a Member of Parliament (MP) for Castle Rising in 1572, but was replaced by William Drury in 1581 when Flowerdew reported sick. On 12 February 1584 he received a grant from the clerk of the royal kitchen of a buck in summer and a doe in winter yearly from any royal forest in Norfolk or elsewhere.

Flowerdew was then returned as MP for Norwich in 1581 when their MP fell sick. The replacements were later ruled inadmissible and invalid. He became a serjeant-at-law and recorder of Great Yarmouth in 1580, and on 23 October 1584 third baron of the exchequer, and became second baron on 26 Jun 1585.

On 20 February 1585 Flowerdew was a member of the special commission for the county of Middlesex, before which William Parry was tried and convicted for high treason. In the winter of 1585 and 1586 he went on circuit in South Wales, and in March held the notorious Lent Black Assize of Exeter from 14 March 1586.

Flowerdew was a man of grasping temper, but apparently not of fine feelings. In 1564 he purchased Stanfield Hall and its furniture from John Appleyard, in order to live there. In 1575 he acquired the site of the dissolved abbey of Wymondham. The parishioners, wishing to preserve the church, petitioned the crown to be allowed to buy it at a valuation, and paid the money. Flowerdew, however, stripped it of its lead and carried off a quantity of freestone, whereupon the exasperated parishioners dismantled it. His lands were dispersed on his death.

Flowerdew died on 31 March 1586. He married Elizabeth, daughter of William Forster, but the marriage was childless. He was buried at Hethersett in April 1586.
