= Esher Place =

Grade I listed building in Esher, Surrey, England

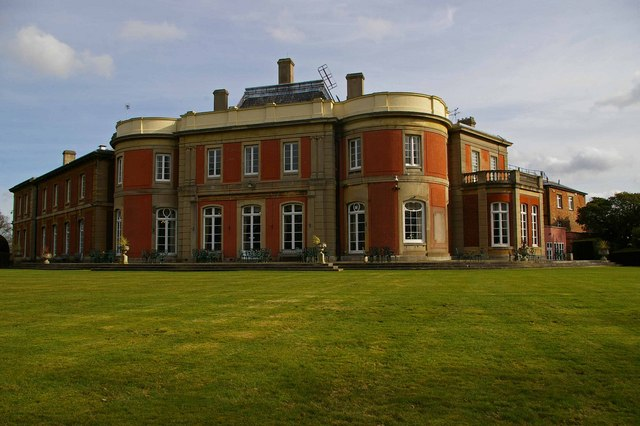
- Esher Place today, from the west showing the rear of the house

- Location within Surrey
- 51°22′19″N 0°22′21″W
- Location: Esher
- OS grid reference: TQ1337264910

History
- Built: 1890s

Site notes
- Area: Surrey
- Owner: Unite

Esher Place is a Grade-II listed country house, since 1953 used as a college by the trade union Unite, in Esher, Surrey, United Kingdom. The building is at least the fourth on approximately the same site and mainly dates to the 1890s. It incorporates traces and small parts of some its earlier forebears.

== History ==
The first recorded predecessor was acquired by or for Peter des Roches, Bishop of Winchester, for his bishopric, early in the 13th century. The house was torn down in the latter half of the 15th century by William Waynflete, Bishop of Winchester and Lord Chancellor, to make way for a large brick residence (with a tall slender tower gatehouse (Waynflete's Tower, see below) that stands today). Cardinal Wolsey, who possessed Esher Place as Bishop of Winchester, was kept under house arrest here after his fall from power.

The estate was then seized by Henry VIII, restored to the Bishop of Winchester by Mary I, and the lease was then re-purchased by the Crown under Elizabeth I, who granted it to her Lord High Admiral, Lord Howard of Effingham, who granted it to Sir Francis Drake's cousin Richard Drake. After the defeat of the Spanish Armada, three captured Spanish admirals and their retinue were held at Esher for over five years. It remained in the Drake family until 1634. Over the next 75 years, the house which had more land than today was held by at least seven individuals, the last two being Sir Thomas Lynch, an early English governor of Jamaica, and John Latton, a pluralistic office-holder under William III (William of Orange).

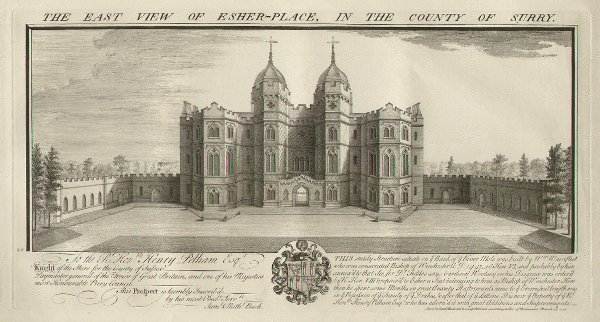
East View of Esher Place, Surrey, England in 1737. A line engraving drawn and engraved by the brothers Samuel and Nathaniel Buck. The print is dated to 1737.

In 1716 its wider agricultural estate was separated from what was its manor house, that is, sold to the first Duke of Newcastle, who owned Claremont in the same parish. The house (and immediate grounds), passed through two owners, including Peter Delaperte, one of the directors of the South Sea Company, and came into the ownership of the Duke's younger brother, Henry Pelham, in 1729. Pelham hired William Kent to renovate the property who did so by having demolished much of the medieval and Tudor portions — except for the gatehouse — and adding wings and some of the earliest Gothic revival ornamentation in England.

In The Seasons, the Scottish poet James Thomson (author of the lyrics to Rule, Britannia!) praises

Esher's peaceful grove/Where Kent and Nature vie for Pelham's love...Where, in the sweetest solitude embraced, by the soft windings of the gentle Mole, from courts and senates Pelham finds repose.".

Esher Place's owner's family by owning the house had the privilege of using one half of the Newcastle Pew at St. George's Church, Esher. After Pelham's death, the property passed to his daughter, and was then purchased in 1805 by London merchant John Spicer.

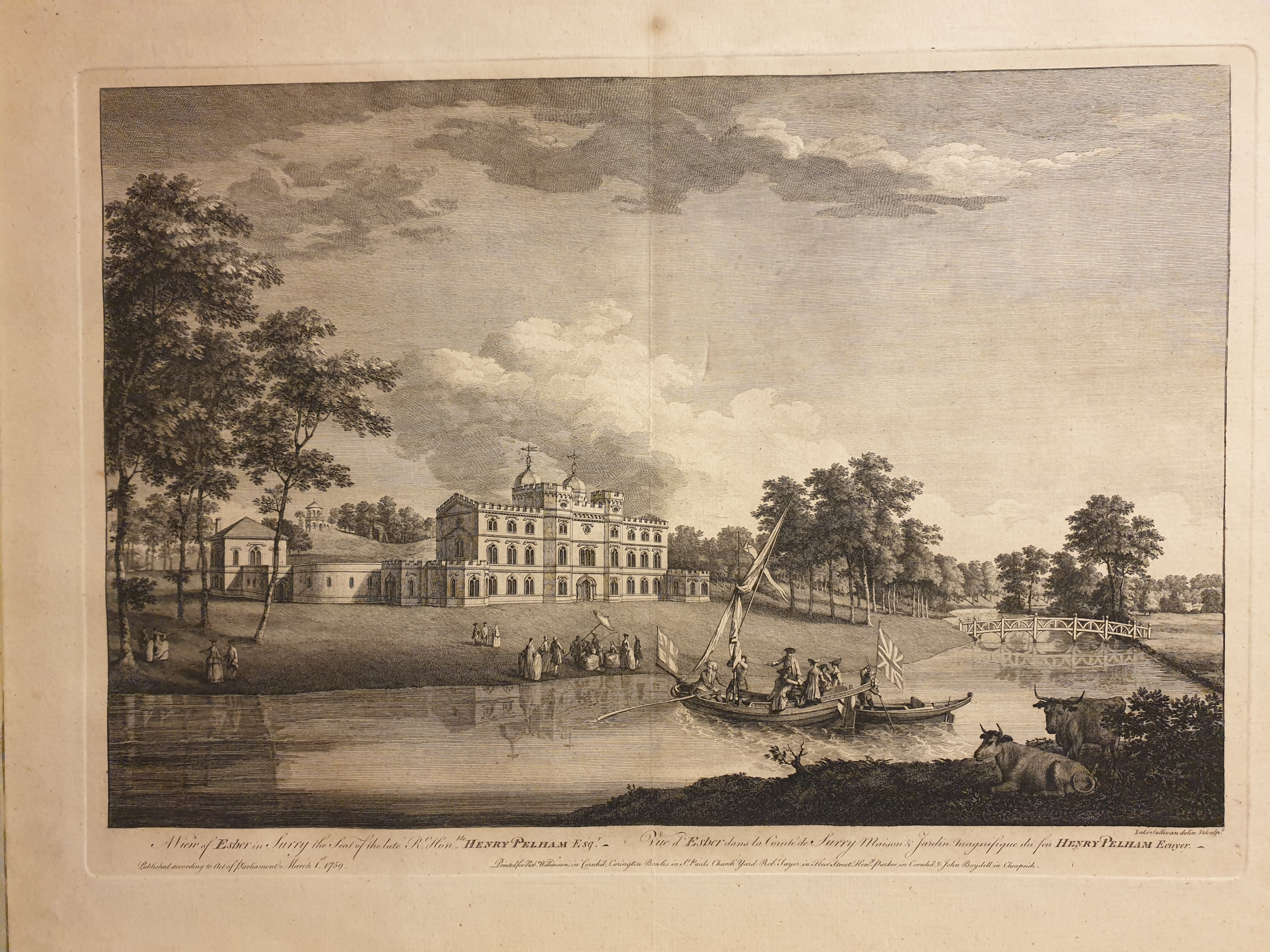
West View of Esher Place, Surrey 1759, as earlier remodelled by William Kent.

Spicer pulled down the house and used the material to build another, designed by Edward Lapidge, on a more elevated site. The new house was stuccoed, in imitation of stone, with Ionic porticoes on north and south fronts, and semi-circular wings. In the late 1890s, this building was then incorporated as a wing into the current French Renaissance style house on the site, designed by G.T. Robinson and Achille Duchêne at the behest of Edgar Vincent, later 1st Lord D'Abernon. Vincent had purchased the much-reduced estate in 1895 from Money Wigram, who had bought it from the Spicer heirs. Vincent — Lord D'Abernon after 1914 — had guests including Edward VIII (the British King in much of the year 1936) when Prince of Wales, Cecil Rhodes, and Anna Pavlova.

However, in 1930 Lord D'Abernon gave the house to the Ragged School Union later the Shaftesbury Society, while most of the grounds were sold to developers who built a housing estate around the mansion. The house became the Shaftesbury Home for young children from 1930 until 1952, when it was sold to the Electrical Trades Union (now merged into Unite the Union), which opened it in 1953 as the college it remains today. The gatehouse on More Lane is located in Lower Green, Esher.

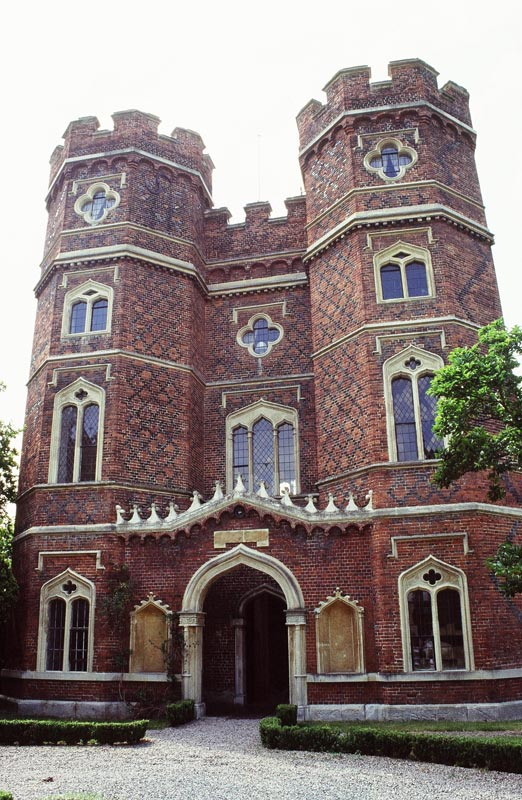
Waynflete's Tower

== Waynflete's Tower ==
Waynflete's Tower (51.3738°N 0.3768°W) is a Grade I listed gatehouse, originally built at the same time as the late 15th-century house, but much modified by William Kent following Henry Pelham's purchase of the property. Kent designed the additions of the two three-bay ranges of three stories to each side and the one-story porch between the turrets with ogee-arched doorway, triple window above with ogee-headed lights (window spaces), and quatrefoil windows. The rib-vaulted entrance hall was the gateway in Wayneflete's time which Kent had stuccoed or plastered over. The Tower is currently a residence.

Waynflete's Tower was also the subject of a 2006 episode of archaeological television programme Time Team.
