= Musbury =

Village in Devon, England

Coordinates: 50.745459°N 3.026999°W

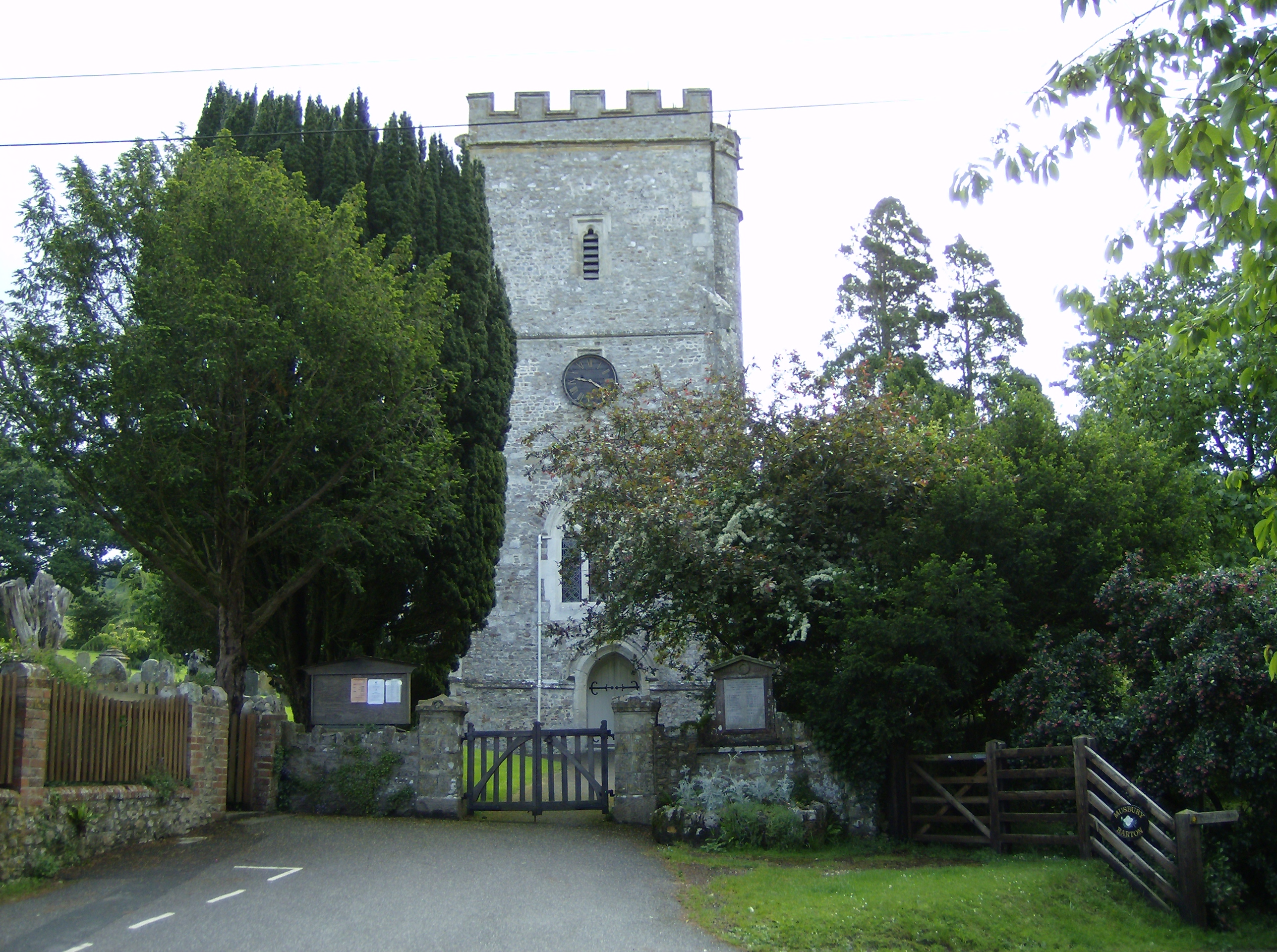
- Musbury Church

- Location within Devon
- Population: 543 (2011 census)
- OS grid reference: SY275945
- Civil parish: Musbury
- District: East Devon
- Shire county: Devon
- Region: South West
- Country: England
- Sovereign state: United Kingdom
- Post town: Axminster
- Postcode district: EX13
- Dialling code: 01297
- Police: Devon and Cornwall
- Fire: Devon and Somerset
- Ambulance: South Western
- UK Parliament: Honiton and Sidmouth

Musbury is a village and civil parish in the East Devon district of Devon, England. It lies approximately 2 miles (3 km) away from Colyton and 2 1/2 miles (4 km) away from Axminster, the nearest towns. Musbury is served by the A358 road and lies on the route of the East Devon Way, a 40-mile (64 km) footpath following the Axe Valley. The village is within the East Devon Area of Natural Beauty. It has a post office, primary school, public house, fuel station and church. The parish population at the 2011 census was 543.

== History ==
The village takes its name from the Iron Age hill fort of Musbury Castle on the hill above it, from which there are views of the Axe Valley. The parish church, which is dedicated to St. Michael, is a 15th-century structure that was much rebuilt and restored by the Victorians. It contains the Drake Memorial dating from 1611. A portrait of the village in 1940 appears in the final chapter of Cecil Day-Lewis's memoir The Buried Day.

== Historic estates ==
- Ash, for many generations the seat of the Drake family. It was the birthplace of John Churchill, 1st Duke of Marlborough (1650-1722) whose mother was Elizabeth Drake.

== Transport ==
=== Road ===
Musbury is located on the A358 between Seaton and Axminster.

=== Bus Services ===
Musbury is served by AVMT Buses' service 885 between Beer/Seaton and Axminster.

=== Coach Excursions ===
Lomax Tours run coach day trips from Musbury to places of interest.

=== Rail ===
The nearest railway station to Musbury is Axminster, 3 miles away.
