= Haldon Hills =

Ridge in Devon, England

Coordinates: 50.64°N 3.55°W

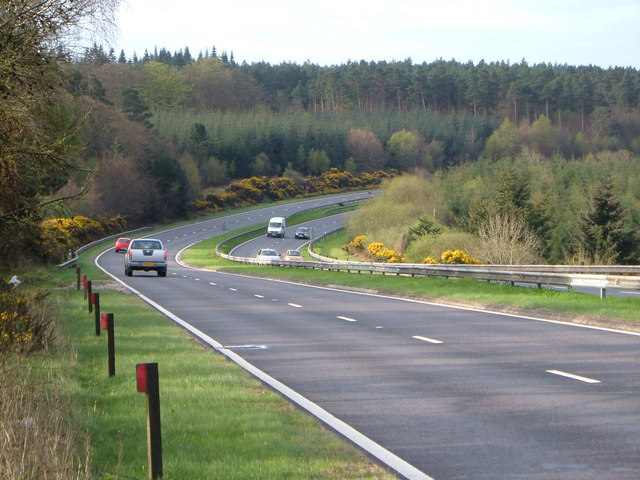
The A380 on the top of Haldon, showing some of the extensive forestry plantation

The Haldon Hills, usually known simply as Haldon, is a ridge of high ground in Devon, England. It is situated between the River Exe and the River Teign and runs northwards from Teignmouth, on the coast, for about 24 km (15 mi) until it dwindles away north west of Exeter at the River Yeo, just south of Crediton. The highest points of just over 250 metres (820 ft) lie to the south west of Exeter. The southernmost part is known as Little Haldon; it is partially separated from the main bulk of the hills by a col formed by the valleys of the Dawlish Water to the east and the valley at Rixdale to the west.

== Geology ==
Haldon is composed of New Red Sandstone covered by a more resistant layer of Upper Greensand. On the highest ground is a layer of gravel containing many flints that is up to 18 metres (60 ft) deep; it is all that remains of a cover of chalk some 180 metres (600 ft) thick that was deposited during the Late Cretaceous and then dissolved away during the tropical climate in the Eocene.

Around the highest ground there are several other rock types. To the south west, around Chudleigh, are limestones of Devonian age, but further north there are shales, sandstones and cherts from the Carboniferous. These are cut through in places by igneous intrusions, mainly of dolerite (quarried at Trusham), and there was also a degree of metalliferous mineralisation which led to the development of a number of mines around the valley of the River Teign; ores of lead, iron, copper, manganese and barite were mined here, for instance at Wheal Exmouth.

== Ecology ==
Three areas of Haldon have been designated as Sites of Special Scientific Interest (SSSIs). The largest is Haldon Forest which covers most of the high woodland north of the A380 road as far as the Haldon Belvedere. This area is primarily designated because of its bird life. It is a nationally significant habitat for the European nightjar (Caprimulgus europaeus) with about 80 pairs breeding here. In addition six bird of prey species breed here: the nationally rare European honey buzzard (Pernis apivorus), the nationally scarce goshawk (Accipiter gentilis), the Eurasian hobby (Falco subbuteo), Eurasian sparrowhawk (Accipiter nisus), common buzzard (Buteo buteo) and common kestrel (Falco tinnunculus). In addition, there have been a total of 35 species of butterflies recorded, including the nationally rare high brown fritillary (Fabriciana adippe) and pearl-bordered fritillary (Boloria euphrosyne). Many moth and dragonfly species are also present.

The other two SSSIs, Great Haldon Heaths and Little Haldon Heaths, consist of a lowland heath habitat of a type only found in south west England. The Devon Whitebeam (Sorbus devoniensis) is common on Little Haldon Heaths, and the rare Climbing Corydalis (Corydalis claviculata) and the parasitic Greater Dodder (Cuscuta europaea) are also found here.

== History ==
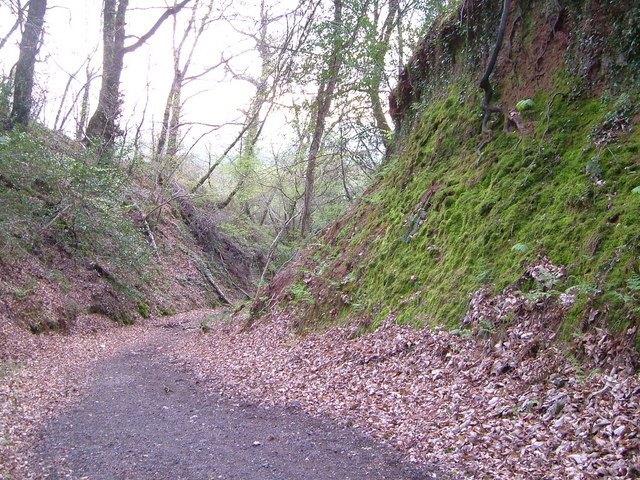
Holloway Lane was cut deeply into the hillside as it climbed Haldon

Haldon is one of the few sites in Devon where there is evidence of settlement in early Neolithic times (around 4000 BC). There are an estimated 26 Bronze Age tumuli on Haldon, though because of the frequent use of the gravel and flints for road building, many more may have been destroyed. On Little Haldon, Castle Dyke, a probable Iron Age square enclosure about 100 metres (330 ft) on each side occupies a good defensive position. An ancient track known as the Portway that crosses Little Haldon passes by this earthwork.

The high ground of Haldon has always been an inconvenience for people travelling south and west from Exeter. There is some evidence of a Roman road leading from Exeter over Haldon towards Newton Abbot, and possibly on to Totnes, but current opinion is that it was never fully developed, being little more than a track. Most of the route of this road was turnpiked in 1760 and now lies under the A380 road. There are several sunken lanes of medieval date or earlier that ascend Haldon from the east. These include St. Andrew's Lane, and Holloway Lane that in places was deliberately cut over 6 m (20 ft) into the hillside.

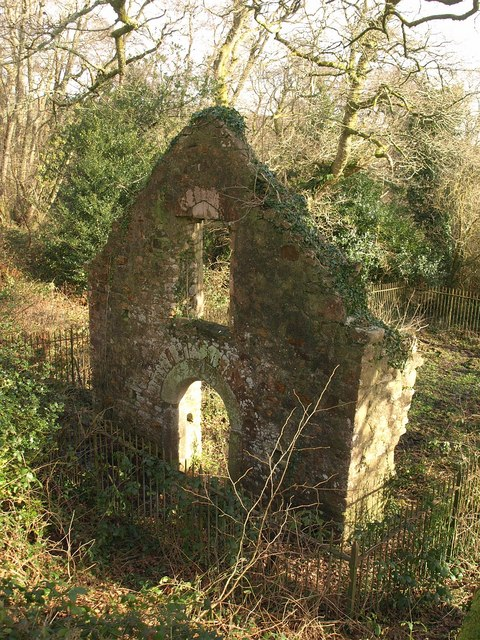
The ruins of Lidwell Chapel

Around Little Haldon there is evidence of about a dozen settlements of medieval date that have since been deserted, for instance Seacombe, in the col between Little Haldon and Haldon itself. Lidwell Chapel, which was probably founded in the 13th century, survives as a ruin on Little Haldon, close to Teignmouth and Dawlish. In the early 14th century it was used by the hermit Robert de Middlecote as a base for robbing and murdering travellers. The building contains a holy well, now badly eroded, which according to legend is said to be bottomless.

In post-medieval times, Haldon became a well-used source of building materials, particularly flint, gravel and sand. There are a number of small disused quarries and pits, mostly now overgrown, which were used to provide gravel for road surfacing in Victorian times.

When the Exeter to Plymouth Line was proposed the cost of tunnelling the Haldon Hills prompted the construction of the railway line along the exposed coast between Starcross and Teignmouth instead. With the operational costs of maintaining the South Devon Railway sea wall, construction of the tunnelled Dawlish Avoiding Line was approved in 1936 but was abandoned with the outbreak of the Second World War in 1939.

In 1928 Haldon Aerodrome was opened on Little Haldon. It became popular for recreational flying and in 1939 became one corner of a triangular air service between Cardiff and Plymouth, developed by the Great Western Railway Air Services Ltd. The aerodrome was taken over by the military at the outbreak of World War II and in 1941 became known as HMS Heron II when it came under the jurisdiction of RNAS Yeovilton. It did not reopen after the war and today there are few visible remains, the most obvious being of the waiting room/club house.

During the 1930s, unemployed men were set to work in Haldon Forest, breaking ground, building tracks, and undertaking other heavy labour. The men lived in a work camp in the Forest, which was one of a number of so-called Instructional Centres run by the Ministry of Labour in order to 'harden' young men who had been out of work for some time. By 1938, the Ministry was operating 35 Instructional Centres across Britain, with a total capacity of over 6,000 places. By 1939, unemployment was declining in the face of impending war, and the Ministry closed down its work camps. During the war, St. Vincent's Industrial School was evacuated from Dartford, Kent, and operated on the site from 1940-47.

Haldon open prison opened on the site in 1949 until it was closed in 1974. Kennford Court and its tennis courts were later built on the site of Halford Instructional Centre.

=== Toponymy ===
The origin of the name Haldon is unclear. It was first recorded as super montem de Hagheledon in 1281. The standard reference work on the place-names of Devon says that this appears to be derived from Old English hagol meaning hail, and the hill may have been named from a famous storm. Alternatively, historian W. G. Hoskins suggested that the name may either be derived from Old English Haw-hyll dun meaning look-out hill, or from halig, meaning holy and therefore presumably indicative of some pre-Christian religious meaning.

=== Travellers ===
In 2002 a group of travellers moved into one of the picnic areas near the racecourse. In April 2010 Devon County Council and Teignbridge District Council intended to carry out a consultation with a view to making the illegal site a legal, permanent traveller site. The permanent travellers' site opened in 2014 and is operated by Teign Housing. The site contains 15 permanent pitches with amenity buildings (designed by Gale & Snowden architects).

== Roads ==
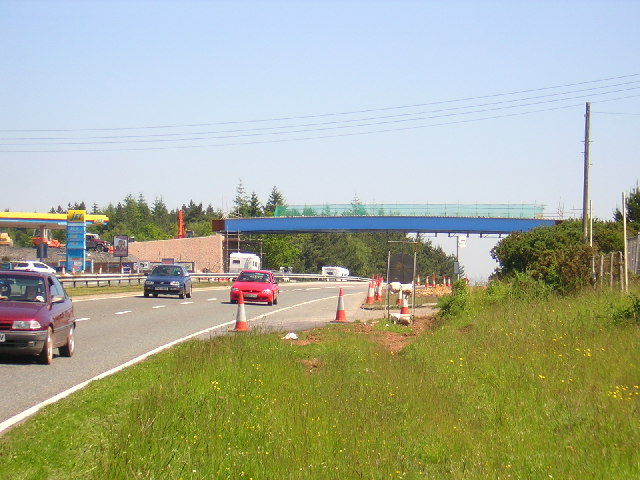
The bridge over the A380 at the top of Telegraph Hill.

Haldon lies across the path of two of the main routes into Devon: the A38 which goes to Plymouth and beyond into Cornwall; and the A380 to Newton Abbot and Torbay. The A380 has a steep ascent to the top of Haldon, known as Telegraph Hill. At the top of this hill was a crossroads known as Haldon Chalets which was an accident blackspot, with 43 recorded collisions including one fatal and five serious accidents since January 1998. In 2005 a new bridge was built over the A380 to remove this danger.

The northbound carriageway originally followed a different route with several sharp bends known as the "Haldon Bends". It is still possible to trace much of this route as the unclassified road heading south from the junction mentioned above has holes in the centre of the road where cats eyes were once located.

== Buildings ==
There are several notable buildings on Haldon. Apart from those discussed in greater depth below, Oxton House, which lies in a secluded valley on the eastern side, was owned by the Earl of Listowel in the early 20th century. South of this is Mamhead House, otherwise known as Dawlish College; and further south again, on a spur of Little Haldon above the stream known as Dawlish Water, is Ashcombe Tower, built in 1833 as an observatory and later owned by Ralph Rayner. In 1935 he used the architect Brian O'Rorke to extend it and convert it into a home. Right on the southern edge of Little Haldon, on the outskirts of Dawlish, is Luscombe Castle which was built in 1800 by John Nash for Charles Hoare, a banker. Its gardens were landscaped by Humphrey Repton.

=== Haldon Belvedere ===
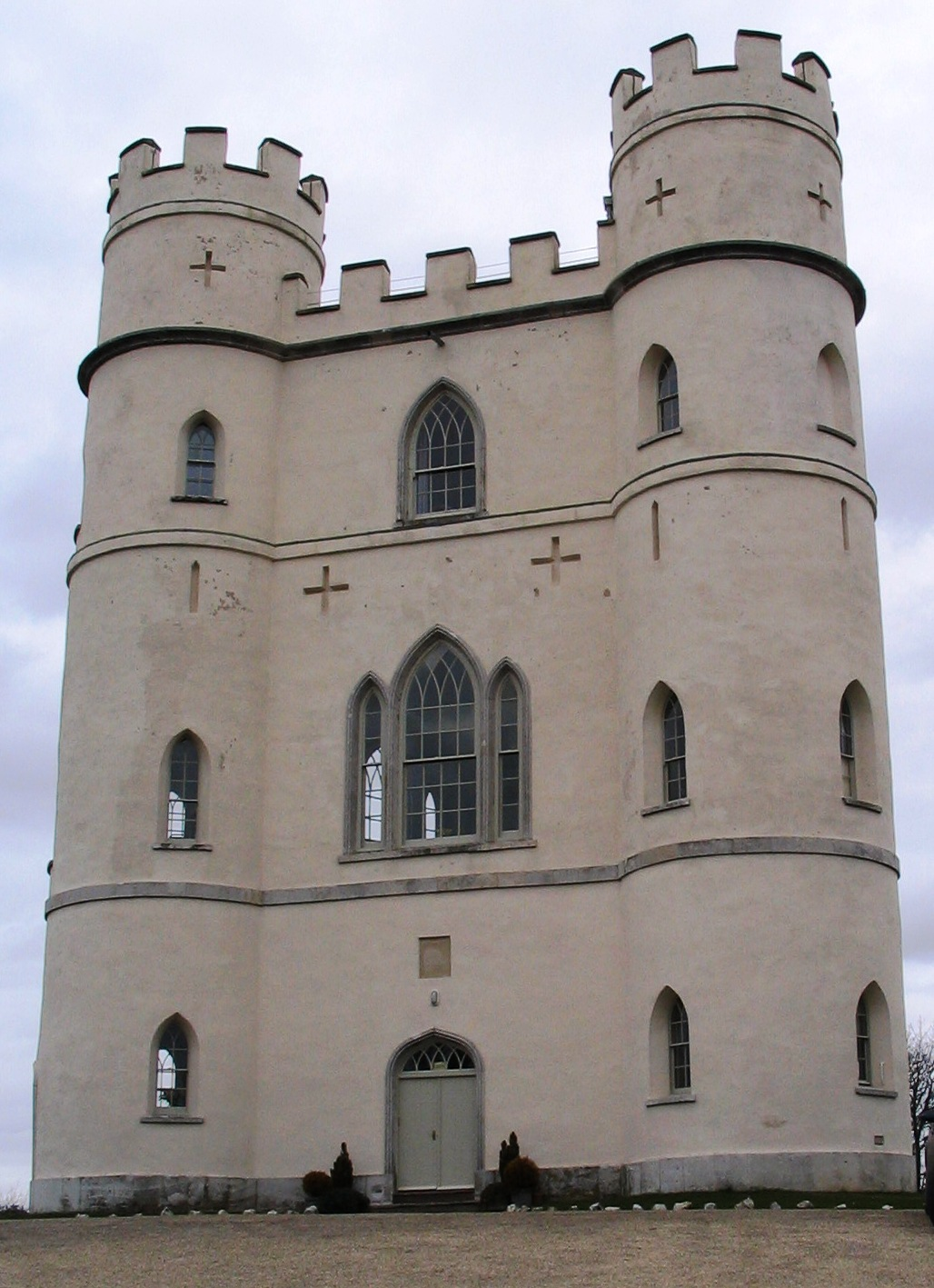
Haldon Belvedere

Haldon Belvedere (also known as Lawrence Castle), a Grade II* triangular tower, stands at a prominent position of the hills overlooking the Exe Estuary. The tower, which was erected by Robert Palk in memory of his friend Major-General Stringer Lawrence, is a prominent local landmark and can be seen from a considerable distance. It is now open to the public having been renovated by Devon Historic Buildings Trust in 1994; it is also a venue for civil ceremonies, and the top floor is available for renting.

=== Haldon House ===
About half a mile north-east of Haldon Belvedere, at the foot of the hills, lay Haldon House which was built by Sir George Chudleigh in the early 18th century. It was bought by Sir Robert Palk in around 1770 and was visited by many great people, including King George IV and Guglielmo Marconi, who performed some of his early experiments in radio transmission from the hills. The majority of the house was demolished in the 1940s; the remaining east wing now forms the Lord Haldon Hotel.

Just beyond this is the small scatter of dwellings known as Dunchideock, a supposed site of fictitious treacle mines, and further north, on a continuation of the Haldon ridge is Cotley Castle, an Iron Age hill fort.

== Leisure ==
Haldon is heavily forested and a significant proportion of its highest ground is managed by Forestry England. As a result, it is popular with local people for walks, running (it is the venue for the weekly Haldon Forest parkrun), orienteering and off-road cycling. At the highest point on the A38 is the Exeter Racecourse, a National Hunt course that holds the Haldon Gold Cup event every November.

On top of Little Haldon is Teignmouth Golf Club, the course of which was designed by Alister MacKenzie. There are several picnic sites and the area is popular for the panoramic views it affords.

== See also ==
- Teignmouth - Haldon and the legend of the 'Parson and Clerk.'

== Sources ==
- Barber, Chips; Barber, Sally (1996). Around & About the Haldon Hills - Revisited. Obelisk Publications. ISBN 1-899073-31-0.
- John Field, "Learning Through Labour: Training, unemployment and the state, 1890-1939", Leeds University Press, 1992, ISBN 0-900960-48-5
- Finneran, Niall; Turner, Sam (2003). "An Archaeological History of the Landscape of Little Haldon, Teignmouth, South Devon". Report and Transactions of the Devonshire Association. 135: 235–259.
