= Lindridge House =

Demolished mansion in Devon, England

Coordinates: 50.5711°N 3.5588°W

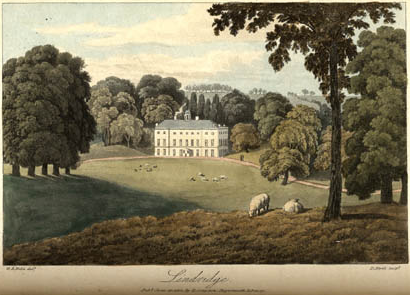
Lindridge, engraving c. 1818. View of west front

Lindridge House was a large 17th-century mansion (with 20th-century alterations), one of the finest in the south-west situated about 1 mile south of Ideford in the parish of Bishopsteignton, Devon, about 4 1/2 miles NE of Newton Abbot. It was destroyed by fire on 25 April 1963 and its ruins were finally demolished in the early 1990s, upon which was built a housing development.

The gardens have been restored and are Grade II listed in the National Register of Historic Parks and Gardens.

== Descent ==
=== Bishops of Exeter ===
The site of Lindridge House is situated 1/2 mile NW of the church in the parish of Bishopsteignton.

=== Dudley ===
After the Dissolution of the Monasteries, in 1549 the estate was acquired by Sir Andrew Dudley, KG (c. 1507 – 1559), a soldier, courtier (Groom of the Bedchamber) and diplomat, and a younger brother of John Dudley, 1st Duke of Northumberland. He held it only for a short period.

=== Duke ===
In 1550 Dudley sold "Lyndrygge" to Richard Duke of London and Otterton, Devon, together with the "lordships and Manors of Bishops Teignton, Radway and West "Teyngmouth" and the rectories and church of Bishops Teignton and Radway". A chief rent of £20 was payable to Dudley after the death of "John, Bishop of Exeter", presumably Bishop John Vesey (died 1554). Richard Duke was MP for Weymouth in 1545, for Dartmouth in 1547 and Sheriff of Devon in 1563–1564. His position as Clerk of the Court of Augmentations from its inception in 1536 to 1554 gave him the opportunity of buying many lands of dissolved monasteries. In 1540 he purchased the large manors of East Budleigh and Otterton, where his family had lived for many generations. From Duke it reverted to the crown in 1572.

=== Martin ===
Arms of Martin: Argent two bars gules. These are the arms of the ancient Norman family of FitzMartin, feudal barons of Barnstaple, Devon

In 1614, the estate was purchased for £2,900 by the lawyer Richard Martin (1570–1618), born in nearby Otterton, a member of the Middle Temple and MP for Barnstaple in 1601 and twice for Christchurch, in 1604 and 1614. He started to rebuild the house in 1617, which was completed by his brother and heir Thomas Martin (died 1620), mayor of Exeter. It was inherited by Thomas's son William Martin (died 1640), who married Agnes Cove of Bishopsteignton. Hugh Clifford's son Thomas Clifford, 1st Baron Clifford of Chudleigh (1630–1673) married Elizabeth Martin (died 1709), from which marriage the present Barons Clifford of Chudleigh are descended. It was sold by the Martin family in 1660 to Sir Peter Lear.

=== Lear ===
Sir Peter Lear, 1st Baronet, purchased the house in 1660. He started a major remodelling of the house, completed in 1673 as evidenced by a datestone on the chimney, which resulted in the demolition of the two wings of the former building leaving the central section 9-bays wide by 6 deep. He created a particularly ornate interior with exceptionally fine wainscotting, doors and fireplaces. The ornamental ceilings in the ballroom, measuring 50 ft × 30 ft, and morning room were particularly noted and the Devon historian Polwhele, who visited in 1793, described the ballroom thus: "It has six windows and its rich, carved work, copper ceiling, and the panels of burnished gold, are highly ornamental".

=== Comyns ===
Mary Lear, the sole daughter and after 1736 the heiress of the 2nd baronet, married in about 1724 to Sir Thomas Tipping, 2nd Baronet, who died the next year aged 25, without children. She remarried in about 1726 to Thomas Comyns. Mary seems to have died before 1732, four years before the death of her father, as Thomas Comyns, who was described as "of Lindridge", was a party in the settlement made upon his marriage to Dame Mary Wolston of Staverton, dated 20 October 1732. Comyns thus appears to have inherited Lindridge from his father-in-law who died in 1736. Comyns still held Lindridge in 1738 but had sold part of the estate, under an Act of Parliament, to "Dr Finney" apparently Protodorus Finney Esq., (died 1734), of Blagdon, a lawyer of Lyon's Inn, Middlesex.

=== Baring ===
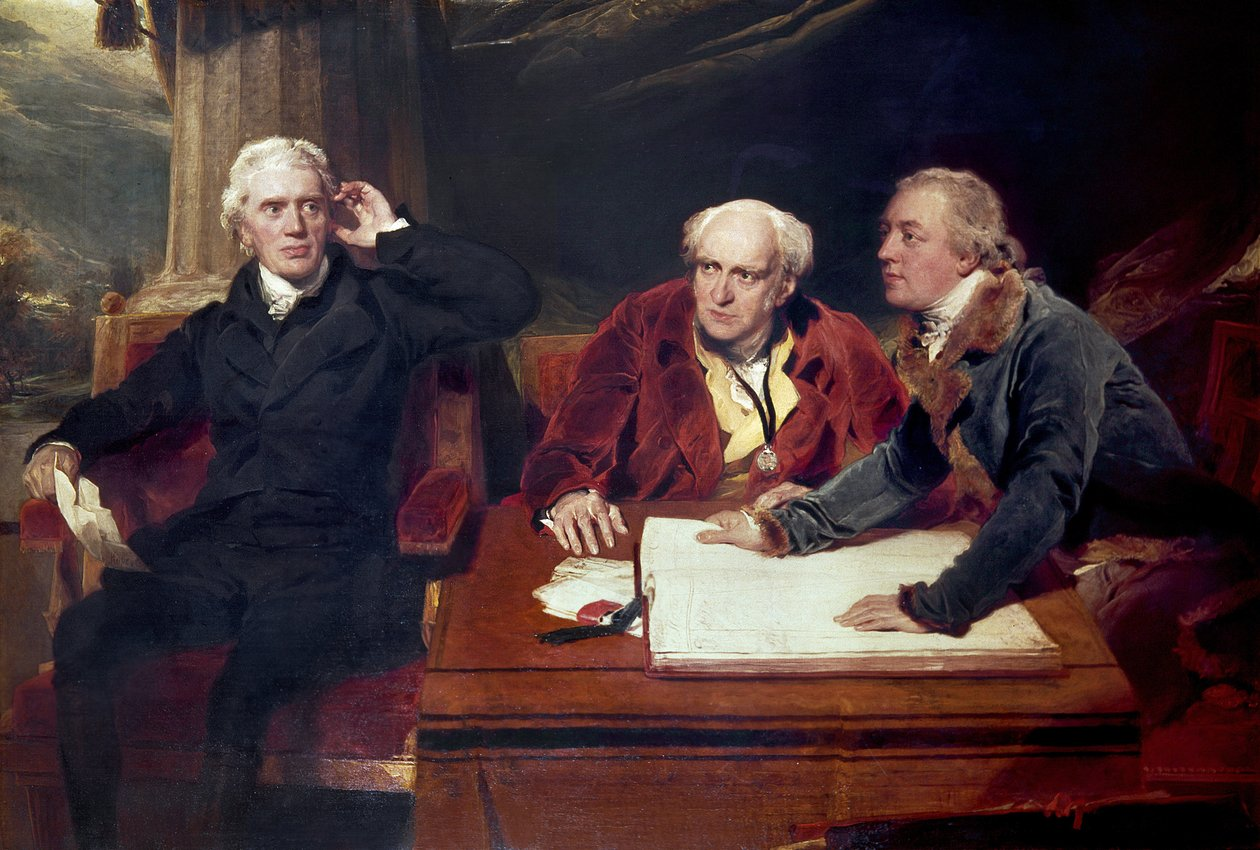
The Baring brothers, John Baring (centre) and Francis (left), with Charles Wall (right)

In 1747 Lindridge was purchased for £8,000 by Johann Baring. Baring was one of the wealthiest cloth merchants of Exeter. His heir was his son John Baring, who founded with his younger brother Francis Baring (1740–1810), created the 1st Baring baronet "of Larkbeer" in 1793, the company which became Barings Bank. In 1755 he purchased Mount Radford House, Exeter, which became his home and where he died, and served as MP for Exeter in 1776, and was Sheriff of Devon in 1776. In 1765 he sold Lindridge to John Line (died 1777).

=== Line ===
John Line (died 1777) was a wealthy self made building contractor who with his partners Thomas Parlby and James I Templer constructed new Royal Navy dockyards at Chatham, Portsmouth and Plymouth. All three appear to have originated in Kent, near Rotherhithe, but moved to Devon following their acquisition of the government contract to reconstruct and expand Plymouth dockyard, to meet the increased space needed by the Royal Navy which had been expanded due to the French invasion threat. Templer had purchased in the same year of 1765 the manor of Teigngrace where in 1780 he built the grand late-Palladian Stover House.

=== Templer ===
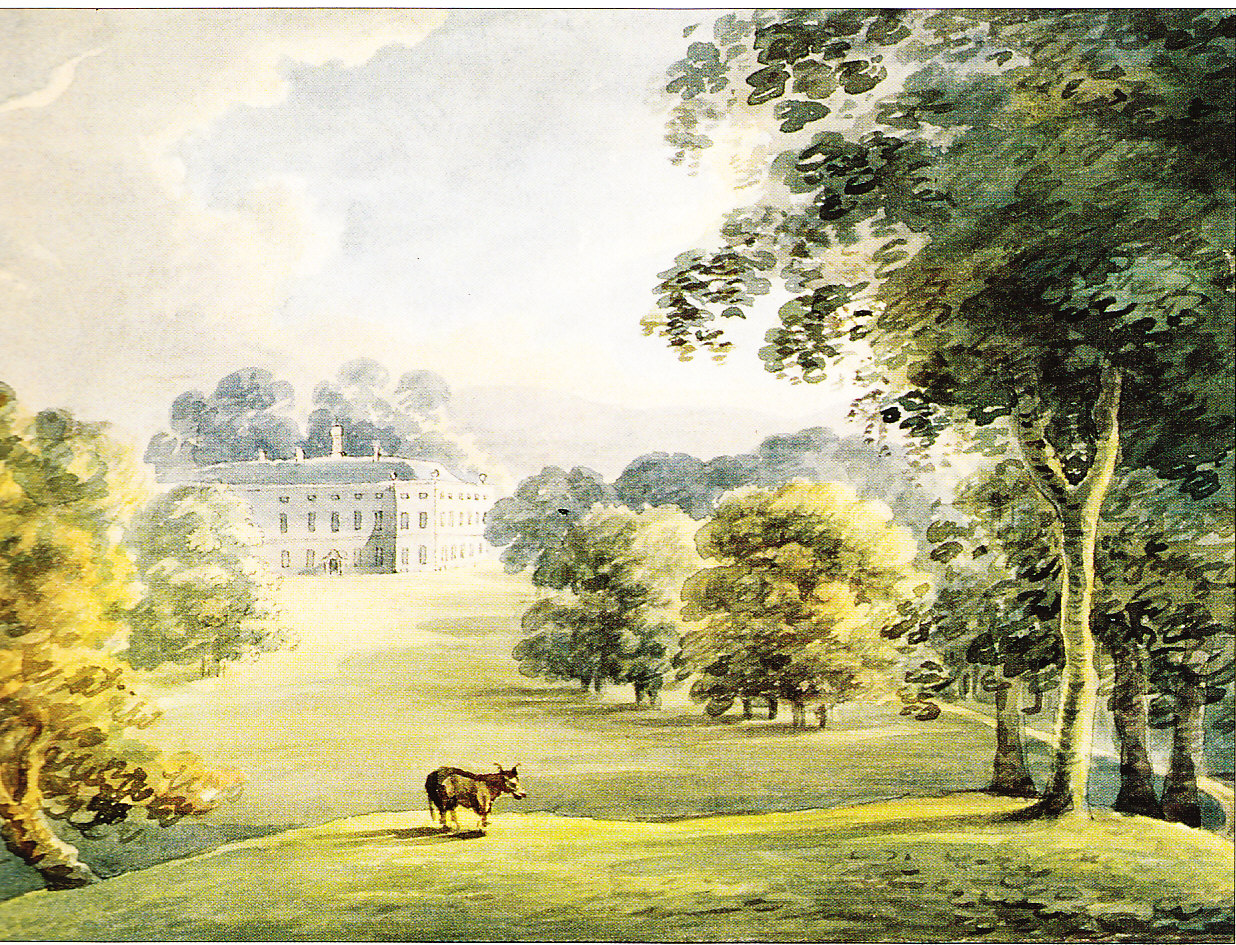
"Lindridge", watercolour by Rev. John Swete dated July 1795. View of west front. Devon Record Office DRO 564M/F8/133

John Line's heir was his godson Lt-Col. Henry Line Templer (1765–1818), 10th Lt Dragoons and one of the Prince Regent's household, whose monument exists in Teigngrace Church, the youngest son of his partner James Templer. Henry married Mary Rogers, daughter of Sir Frederick Leman Rogers, 7th Baronet (1782–1851). He had four sons and 5 daughters. In 1778, the year after her husband's death, John Line's young widow Jane (died 1813) remarried to Rev. John Templer (1751–1832), the second son of her first husband's partner James Templer and the elder brother of her first husband's heir, Henry Line Templer, after whose early death in 1818 Lindridge was purchased from his heirs by his brother Rev. John Templer. Jane died in 1813, having predeceased her second husband, who continued to live on at Lindridge, keeping a pack of harriers there, until his death in 1832, nursed in his old age by his widowed sister Lady Anne de la Pole (died 1832), the widow of Sir John de la Pole, 6th Baronet (1757–1799) of Shute, Devon, as is recorded on her mural monument in Shute Church. Lady Anne died also at Lindridge two months after her brother, and the estate descended to her and her brother's three-year-old great nephew James George John Templar (1829–1883), son of Rev James Ackland Templer (1797–1866) by his wife Anne Mason, daughter of Bryant Mason. Whilst credible accounts, including that quoted above of Lysons, state that John Line bequeathed Lindridge to his godson Henry Line Templer, (born 1765) the youngest son of his partner James Templer (died 1782), but its descent was certainly described by Rev. John Swete (died 1821) who passed by it in July 1795, and painted it in watercolour, as "by the decease of the last proprietor Mr Line it was by his widow convey'd by marriage to the Rev'd John Templar". Swete described Lindridge in July 1795 as follows:

There is wanting only water at Lindridge to render it one of the finest spots in the county, but it lies too near Haldown to have a stream of any size, and perhaps amid scenery which is indebted to nature for all its charms it were better to be as it is without a sheet of water altogether, than to have it introduced by art which could not be wholly concealed. The house is a handsome pile and of considerable size though in no wise so large as the antient one which (it is said) covered over no less than an acre of ground. This magnificent building was a possession of the Martyns, whose seats at successive periods ( among others) I have already noticed at Cockington, Dartington and Oxton. (Swete's own home, inherited from his paternal grandmother, a Martyn) A daughter of the last Martyn of Lindridge, a co-heiress, was married to the Lord Treasurer Clifford, the first of the family that was ennobled, about the middle of the last century, which connection between the two families seems to have been kept up to the time of my relative and predecessor at Oxton, whose name was Wm. Clifford Martyn. From the Martyns it past to the Lears and others, till by the decease of the last proprietor Mr Line it was by his widow convey'd by marriage to the Rev'd John Templar. Of the old house there is one room yet retained and which has undergone but little alteration, its dimensions are 50 × 30 and by its size and costly decorations we may collect no inadequate idea of the opulence of the family. Of the ornamental part tho' the room was fitted up in 1673 there are yet in being some rich carved work and highly burnished gilding, the expence [sic] of which latter article (according to the disbursements in the steward's book) amounted to no less a sum than 500 pounds. I past from this charming spot, through an avenue at the back of the house, into the public road...

Swete's own eldest son and heir John Beaumont Swete (1788–1867) married Mary Templer (1794–1886), a daughter of Henry Line Templer and Mary Rogers. The young James' father was George Templer (1755–1819), of Shapwick, Somerset, which manor he had purchased from Dennis Rolle of Stevenstone. George Templer, the brother of Rev. John Templer and of Lady Anne de la Pole, was an officer of the Honourable East India Company and had married in 1781 Jane Paul, the eldest daughter of Henry Paul, of West Monkton, Somerset, a wealthy officer also in the service of the HEIC. James George John Templer (died 1883) married Frances Mortimer and had four sons and four daughters. His eldest son and heir was John George Edmund Templer (1855–1924), JP, Captain in the Highland Light Infantry and Captain and honorary Major in the Royal 1st Devon Imperial Yeomanry.

=== Cable ===
Sometime before 1910 John Templer (died 1924) let Lindridge to Sir Ernest Cable (1859–1927), later created 1st Baron Cable of Ideford in 1921, at an annual rent of £380. Cable was an Indian-born British merchant and financier. He served as Sheriff of Calcutta in 1905 and was knighted when George, Prince of Wales and his wife Mary of Teck visited the city in the following year. He returned to England by 1913 and in 1916 was appointed High Sheriff of Devon. The lease was increased to 40 years in 1915 at a rent of £643 per annum, whereupon Cable started making major alterations. In 1920 John Templar sold the freehold of Lindridge to Cable for £75,000, and died four years later leaving his next younger brother James Mortimer Templer (1858–1934), of Brampford House, Brampford Speke, Exeter, the senior representative of the Templer family. The Templar family had made few changes to the house. Cable's alterations between 1915 and 1916, to the design of James Ransome, gave Lindridge the external appearance of a Queen Anne house, with the plain stucco exterior having been replaced with a facing of red brick. Glazing bars were added to the sash windows and wooden shutters were added. An arched top was given to the uppermost central window of the south and east fronts and the parapets were removed. Stone urns were placed on the corners of the roof and formal gardens were added. The grounds were landscaped between 1913 and 1914 by James Ransome with Robert Veitch of Exeter and Edward White. Cable and his wife had three daughters and one son, George, who was killed in action in the First World War in 1915. Lord and Lady Cable established a hospital for wounded soldiers at Lindridge, with their eldest daughter Noorouz, Lady Alexander, acting as matron. Lady Cable died in 1924 and Cable survived her for three years, dying in London in 1927.

=== Benthall ===
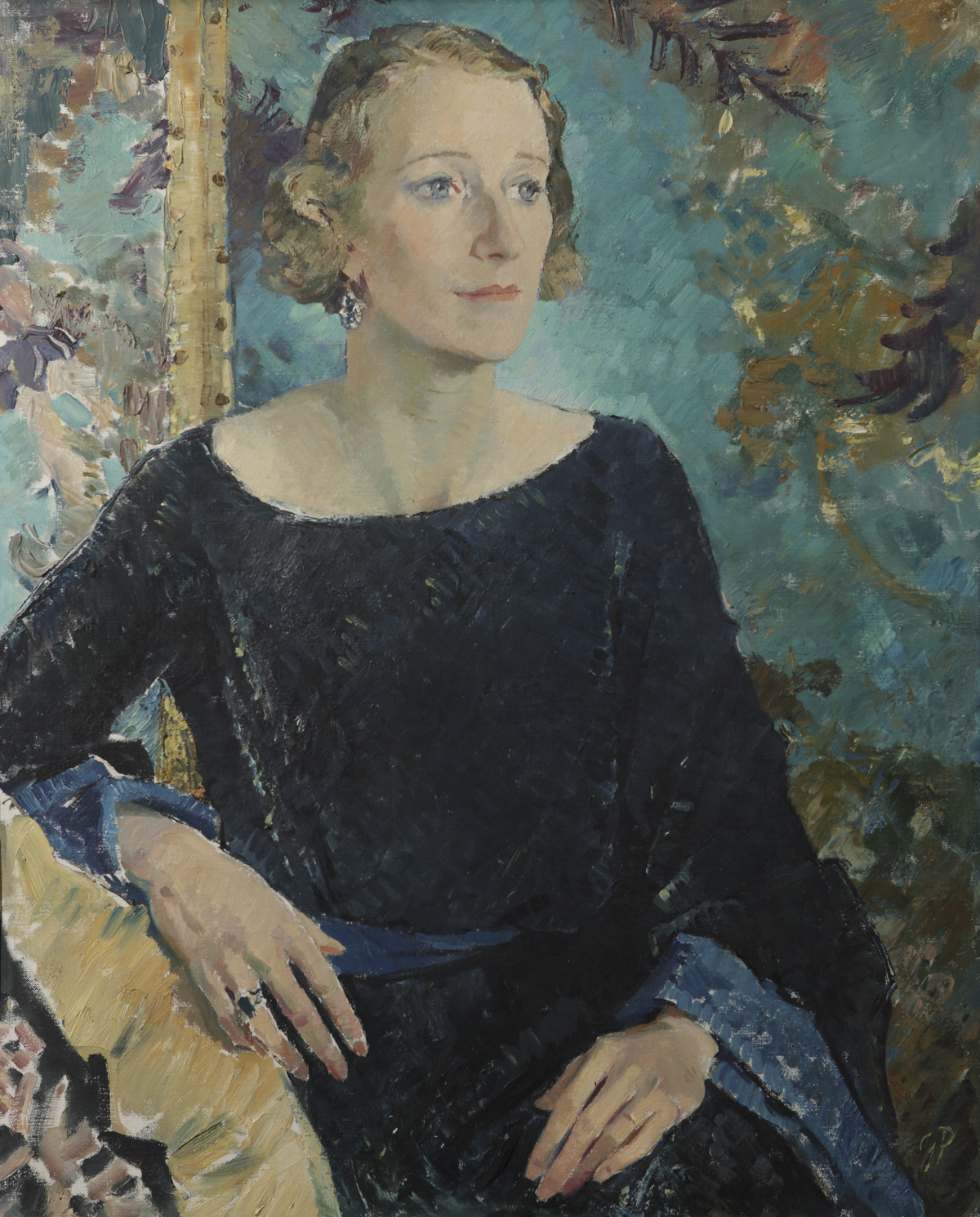
The Honourable Ruth Cable (c. 1898 – 1973), Lady Benthall, 1935, by Glyn Philpot

On the death of Lord Cable in 1927 the estate was inherited by his daughter Ruth, the wife of Sir Edward Benthall (died 1961), of Benthall Hall, Shropshire. In Kellys Directory of 1939 Lindridge was described as "the property and residence of Sir Edward Charles Benthall, the house is of stone, standing in a park of 145 acres, approached from Chudleigh by a double avenue of elms, and from Newton Abbot by a drive through a wood a mile in extent". The Benthall's wealth had been located in India and was lost following nationalisation after Indian Independence in 1947.

Sir Edward Benthall remained at Lindridge, but unable to afford the large staff needed to maintain the house, several rooms were closed-up. His wife spent most of her time in the South of France. On sir Edward's death in 1961 his son Michael Benthall inherited. In June 1962, Lady Benthall sold at auction most of the contents and fittings, including the 5 ft 6in × 3 ft 9in ballroom chandelier, which sold for £4,200.

=== Brady ===
Michael Benthall was based in London as director of the Old Vic theatre, and had little use for his Devon property which he sold to timber merchants, with two farms, for £60,000. The ancient trees in the park were cut down and sold. The house with 60 acres of land was then re-sold to Mr Brady of Brixham for £15,750. Brady at first stated his intention to be the restoration of the house and its use as his family home, but later announced plans for a development of 100 holiday chalets in the grounds, which scheme was rejected by the parish council. Parts of the house were restored and with the garden it was opened to the public in 1962. The house was destroyed by a fire in the early morning of 25 April 1962.

== Destruction by fire ==
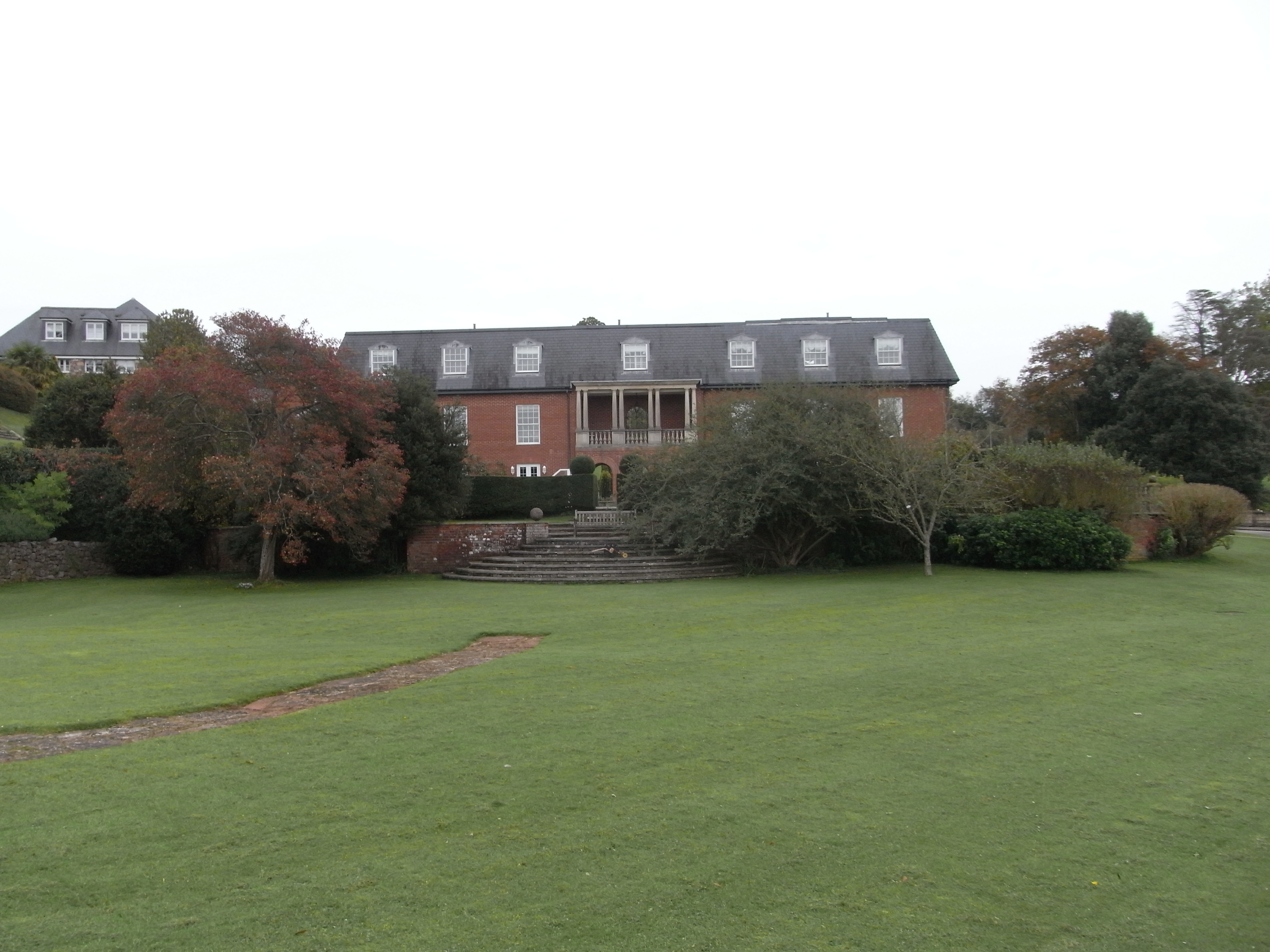
View of New Lindridge House, west front, pastiche 1990s housing development on site of former 17th-century mansion house "Lindridge House" destroyed by fire in 1960s

A fire started in the early morning of 25 April 1962. Fire engines from five stations attended, but as the swimming pool, contrary to the stipulations of the insurance policy, had been drained for cleaning and not refilled, lack of water made the fire uncontrollable. Only the blackened walls remained standing. The ruins stood for the next twenty years and were then demolished for the site of a housing development including a red-brick apartment block which now occupies the site of the former mansion.

== Sources ==
- Lost Heritage, a Memorial to the Lost Country Houses of England, website by Matthew Beckett. History and photographs c. 1930s of Lindridge.
- Chard, Judy, The Burning Buddha of Bishopsteignton, Judy Chard looks at the history of one of Devon's oldest manors, Devon Life online, re-published in https://web.archive.org/web/20101017050929/http://www.templerfamily.co.uk/Buildings/Lindridge%20House/lindridge_house.htm. Author of "Tales of the Unexplained in Devon", in which she describes a stone statue of a Buddha, formerly the property of the Templers, from the movement of which from its accustomed place supposedly emanated a curse resulting in the fire.
- Burke's Genealogical and Heraldic History of the Landed Gentry, 15th Edition, ed. Pirie-Gordon, H., London, 1937, p. 2217, pedigree of Templer, late of Lindridge
