= Bourchier Wrey Savile =

Arms of Savile: Argent, on a bend sable three owls of the field

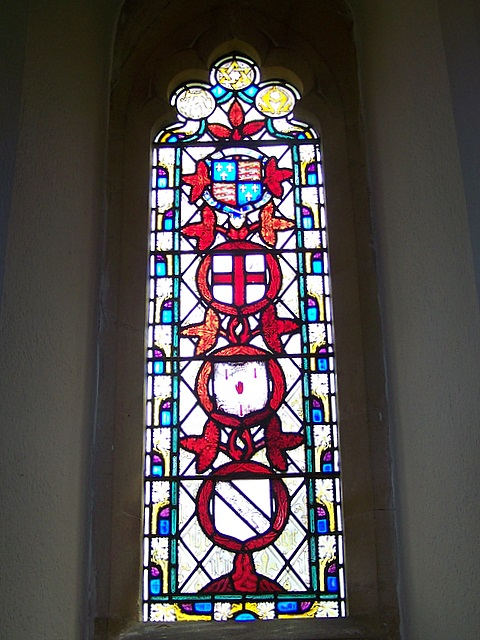
Stained glass window, St Michael's Church, Dunchideock, Devon, commemorating Bourchier Wrey Savile, Rector 1872-88. Bottom two shield display the arms of the Wrey baronets and Savile

Rev. Bourchier Wrey Savile (11 March 1817–14 April 1888) was a Church of England clergyman and theological writer.

== Origins ==
He was born on 11 March 1817, the second son of Albany Savile (d. 1831), a Member of Parliament for Okehampton in Devon, by his wife Eleanora Elizabeth Wrey, a daughter of Sir Bourchier Wrey, 7th Baronet (1757–1826), of Tawstock Court in North Devon.

== Career ==
He was admitted to Westminster School on 23 January 1828, and was elected a King's Scholar there in 1831. He became a pensioner of Emmanuel College, Cambridge, in 1835, and graduated Bachelor of Arts in 1839 and Master of Arts in 1842.

He was curate successively of Christ Church, Halesowen, Worcestershire, in 1840, of Okehampton, Devonshire, in 1841, and of Newport, Devonshire, in 1848; chaplain to Hugh Fortescue, 2nd Earl Fortescue of Castle Hill, Filleigh in North Devon, from 1844; rector of West Buckland, Devonshire, in 1852 (a Fortescue manor); then curate of Tawstock, Devonshire (a Wrey manor), in 1855, of Tattingstone, Suffolk, in 1860, of Dawlish, Devonshire, in 1867, of Combeinteignhead, Devonshire, in 1870, and of Launcells, Cornwall, in 1871. From 1872 to his death he was rector of Dunchideock with Shillingford St. George, Devonshire.

== Marriage and children ==
In April 1842 he married Mary Elizabeth Whyte, a daughter of James Whyte of Pilton House, North Devon (near Tawstock), an Irish gentleman who purchased Pilton House in 1806 from Robert Newton Incledon (1761-1846). By his wife he had issue four sons and five daughters, including:

- Bourchier Beresford Savile, paymaster of the Royal Navy;
- Henry Savile, a Commander in the Royal Navy.

== Death ==
He died at Shillingford Rectory on 14 April 1888, and was buried on 19 April.

== Publications ==
Savile was a contributor to the Transactions of the Victoria Institute and to the Journal of Sacred Literature, and the author of upwards of forty volumes. His works, chiefly theological and in tone evangelical, display much learning. His volume on Anglo-Israelism and the Great Pyramid (1880) exposes the fallacies of the belief in the Jewish origin of the English people. Among his other publications were:

1. ‘The Apostasy: a Commentary on 2 Thessalonians, Chapter ii.,’ 1853.
2. ‘The First and Second Advent, with reference to the Jew, the Gentile, and the Church of God,’ 1858.
3. ‘Lyra Sacra: being a Collection of Hymns Ancient and Modern, Odes, and Fragments of Sacred Poetry,’ 1861; 3rd edit. 1865.
4. ‘Bishop Colenso's Objections to the Veracity of the Pentateuch: an Examination,’ 1863.
5. ‘The Introduction of Christianity into Britain: an Argument on the Evidences in favour of St. Paul having visited the Extreme Boundary of the West,’ 1861.
6. ‘Egypt's Testimony to Sacred History,’ 1866.
7. ‘The Truth of the Bible: Evidence from the Mosaic and other Records of Creation,’ 1871.
8. ‘Apparitions: a Narrative of Facts,’ 1874; 2nd edit. 1880.
9. ‘The Primitive and Catholic Faith in relation to the Church of England,’ 1875.
10. ‘Turkey; or the Judgment of God upon Apostate Christendom under the Three Apocalyptic Woes,’ 1877.
11. ‘Prophecies and Speculations respecting the End of the World,’ 1883.
12. ‘Mr. Gladstone and Professor Huxley on the Mosaic Cosmogony,’ 1886.
13. 'M. Queen Victoria To The Throne of David, and of The Reasons For Fixing The End of The Age In 1882', 1880.
14. 'The Neanderthal Skull on Evolution,' 1885.
