= Dunchideock =

Civil parish in Devon, England

Coordinates: 50.68°N 3.58°W

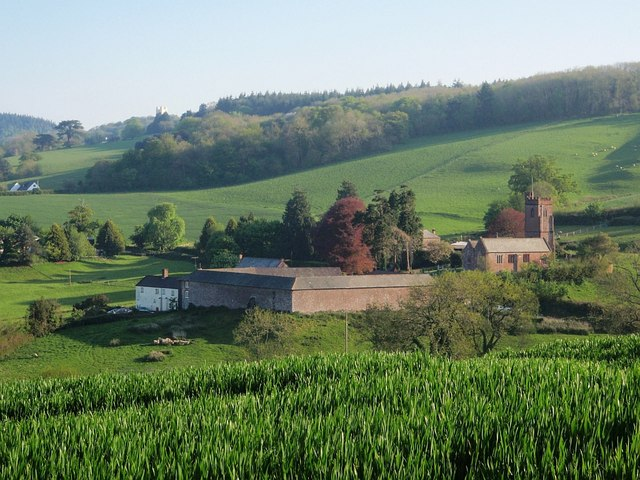
- A view over part of Dunchideock. The church is on the right with Dunchideock farm in front. Haldon Belvedere is on the skyline to the left.

- Location within Devon
- Population: 262 (2001 UK Census)
- OS grid reference: SX8887
- District: Teignbridge
- Shire county: Devon
- Region: South West
- Country: England
- Sovereign state: United Kingdom
- Post town: EXETER
- Postcode district: EX2, EX6
- Dialling code: 01626
- Police: Devon and Cornwall
- Fire: Devon and Somerset
- Ambulance: South Western
- UK Parliament: Teignbridge

Dunchideock (/ˈdʌntʃɪdək/ DUN-chid-ək, /dʌnˈtʃɪdiək/ dun-CHID-ee-ək) is a small civil parish on the north eastern slopes of the Haldon Hills in Teignbridge, Devon, England. It covers an area of 392 hectares (970 acres) and lies about 6 km (3.7 mi) south-west of Exeter and 11 km (6.8 mi) north-east of Bovey Tracey. The parish, with a population of 262 in 2001, lacks a compact village, but consists of scattered dwellings. It is surrounded clockwise from the north by the parishes of Holcombe Burnell, Ide, Shillingford St. George, Kenn, and Doddiscombsleigh.

== Etymology ==
The name Dunchideock originates in the Common Brittonic language. First attested in the Domesday Book of 1086 as Donsedoc, the first part of the name derives from the word whose modern Welsh form is din ("fort"), while the second part is the adjective found in modern Welsh as coediog ("wooded"). The form of the Dun-element later changed by association with the Old English word dūn ("hill"). According to W. G. Hoskins, the place-name originally referred to the nearby Iron Age hill fort of Cotley Castle.

== History ==
The parish church is dedicated to St Michael and is Grade I listed. It originated in 1308 at the latest, but the present church building, built of red sandstone, was started in the late 14th century. It has been partially rebuilt and restored many times. There is a good font dated to around 1400, some notable carved bench-ends, roof-bosses and rood-screen; and several memorials, most notably to Aaron Baker, who rebuilt the chancel aisle in 1669, and Stringer Lawrence. The theological writer Bourchier Wrey Savile was rector of Dunchideock with Shillingford St. George from 1872 to his death in 1888.

Within the parish was the former Haldon House which was the home of Sir Robert Palk, 1st Baronet. Mostly demolished in the 1920s, the remaining wing is now the Best Western "Lord Haldon Hotel". Also in the parish is Haldon Belvedere, a triangular tower on top of Haldon that was built by Palk in 1788 in memory of his friend General Stringer Lawrence.

Archie Winckworth, the former owner of Dunchideock House, posted a memoir about the village and its history, including an account of its buried treasure. The cellars of Dunchideock House are fancifully supposed to contain a treacle mine.
