= Cotley Castle =

Hill fort in Devon, England

Coordinates: 50.6943°N 3.6150°W

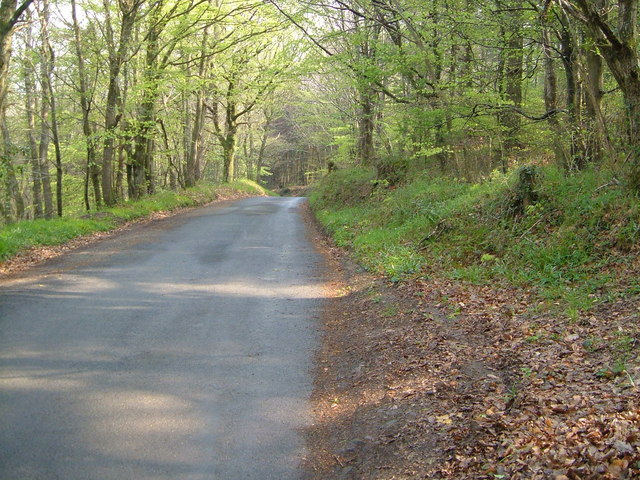
The road running along the edge of Cotley Castle

Cotley Castle is a large Iron Age Hill fort near Dunchideock in Devon and close to Exeter in England. It occupies a significant hilltop at 220 metres (720 ft) above sea level, just to the north of Great Haldon, part of the same ridge of the Haldon Hills.
