= Lidwell Chapel =

Medieval chapel in England

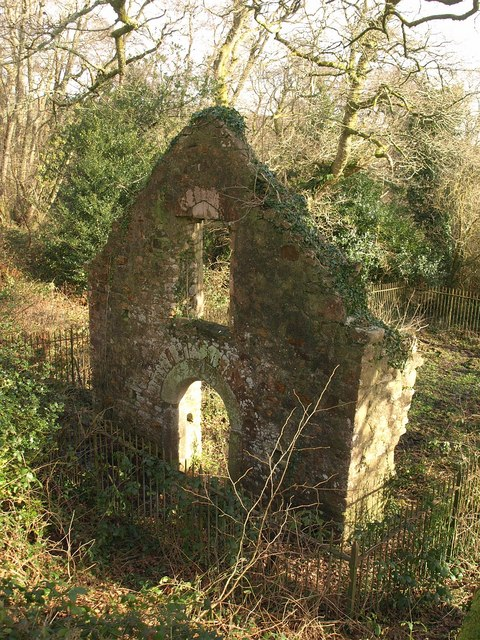
- West wall of the chapel

- Location within Devon
- Alternative names: St Mary's Chapel, Lithwell Chapel, Luidwell Chapel etc.

General information
- Type: Chapel
- Location: Dawlish, England
- Coordinates: 50.574781°N 3.520642°W
- Grid position: SX923758

Technical details
- Material: Granite

Design and construction
- Designations: Grade II Listed Building

Lidwell Chapel, also known as St Mary's Chapel, is a medieval chapel, now in ruins, within the parish of Dawlish in Devon, England. The chapel is a Grade II listed building, and was first listed in 1951.

== Description ==
The ruins of the chapel are situated in a small wood at the base of Little Haldon, an area of heathland near the towns of Dawlish and Teignmouth. A public footpath leads down from the higher ground to the site. There is an associated holy well close beside the ruin, which is now obscured. Only the west wall of the building remains standing, although the foundations of the others can be seen. The ruin is surrounded with a set of iron railings, with a gate at its eastern end, beside which is a wooden sign naming the chapel.

Further down the hill is Lidwell farm, which is likely to have been named after the well with the chapel.

== History ==
The chapel is associated with a 14th-century monk called Robert de Middlecote, whose deeds are recorded in the Register of John Grandisson, Bishop of Exeter. De Middlecote is recorded as having raped a woman in the chapel, broken into and robbed a house, and robbed numerous travellers on the nearby road between Teignmouth and Exeter on the heath. A number of other supposed actions of this man are a part of the local legend which surrounds him. One is that he hosted travellers and fed them food laced with a sleep-inducing substance before killing them; he then stole any valuables that they were carrying and threw their corpses into the well.
