= John Swete =

English clergyman and artist (1752-1821)

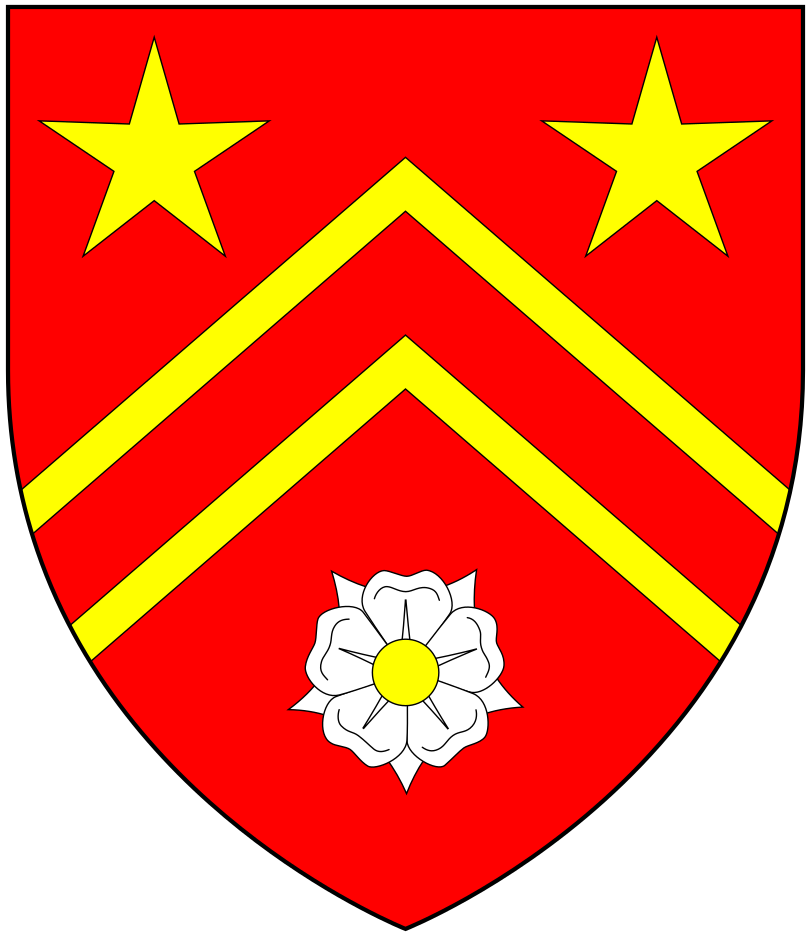
Arms of Swete: Gules, two chevronels between in chief as many mullets or and in base a rose argent seeded of the second

Rev. John Swete (born John Tripe) (baptised 13 August 1752 – 25 October 1821) of Oxton House, Kenton in Devon, was a clergyman, landowner, artist, antiquary, historian and topographer and author of the Picturesque Sketches of Devon consisting of twenty illustrated journals of Devon scenery. He was a connoisseur of landscape gardening, and much of his Travel Journals consist of his commentary of the success or otherwise of the landscaping ventures of his gentry friends, neighbours and acquaintances in Devon. He himself undertook major building and landscaping works at Oxton.

== Biography ==
John Tripe was born in 1752, the son Nicholas Tripe, a surgeon in Ashburton, Devon, by his wife Rebecca Yard, according to Swete's Journal a member of the ancient Devon gentry family of Yard of Whiteway in the parish of Kingsteignton. He was born in his father's home in Ashburton, which in 1997 was serving as the Golden Lion Hotel.

He was educated at Ashburton Free School and with the assistance of Sir Robert Palk, 1st Baronet (1717–1798) of Haldon House in the parish of Kenn, near Exeter, went to Eton College in 1769 and then later to University College, Oxford. Tripe graduated with a B.A. in 1774 and obtained an M.A. in 1777. In 1775, he became a curate at Highweek, Newton Abbot and in 1776 he was appointed curate at Kenn. In 1781, he was made a prebendary of the Diocese of Exeter.

Tripe Name Act 1781
- Act of Parliament
- Parliament of Great Britain
- Long title: An Act to enable John Tripe, Clerk, and the Heirs Male of his Body, to take and use the Surname and Arms of Swete.
- Citation: 21 Geo. 3. c. 20 Pr.
- Territorial extent: Great Britain

Dates
- Royal assent: 11 April 1781
- Commencement: 31 October 1780 (Note: Start of session.)

Status: Current legislation

In 1781 by a private act of Parliament, the Tripe Name Act 1781 (21 Geo. 3. c. 20 Pr.), which received royal assent on 11 April 1781, John Tripe adopted the surname and arms of Swete in lieu of his patronymic, in order to comply with the terms of a bequest from Mrs. Esther Swete (1712–1781) formerly of 30 Great George Street, Westminster, of Traine House in Modbury and of Preston in Ermington, Devon, and of Bath in Somerset, a relative of the Yard family of Chudleigh, of which family was John Tripe's mother. She was born Esther Prickman, daughter and sole heiress of Thomas Prickman (d.1728) of Falmouth in Cornwall. She was a minor aged 16 at her father's death, and by his will he left her in the guardianship of Adrian Swete (1670–1733) of Traine, Modbury, Sheriff of Devon in 1725, and his sister Philippa Swete, who in 1728 married her off at the age of 16 to their 55-year-old youngest brother (as his 2nd wife) Captain Mayne Swete (1673–1735), whose first wife, Grace Walrond, had left him an estate in Falmouth, Antigua, inherited from her deceased first husband William Wainwright. Mayne Swete moved to Antigua and was a member of the Assembly in 1704 and 1715. Mayne Swete had by his wife Esther Prickman an only child, Adrian John Swete (1731–1755), who after having received his BA at Balliol College, Oxford in 1751, died unmarried in 1755. He was godfather to John Tripe (later Rev. John Swete). He was the last of the Swetes of Modbury and bequeathed his estates to his mother Esther, who treated her son's godson as the grandson she never had, and made him her heir. Her mural monument survives in Ermington Church, where she was buried, erected by Rev. John Swete, inscribed as follows:

Here lie the Remains of Mrs Esther Swete of Train in Modbury who died Jan 1781 aged 68. In the amiable endowments and elegancies peculiar to her sex excelled perhaps by few, but by none in fortitude of mind and resignation to the will of God, with which she sustained the loss of her only son Adrian John Swete Esqr. who died at the early period of 24 years, especially if the greatness of that loss were to be estimated by the high attainments of worth, that marked him as the scholar and the Christian. Memor beneficiorum, et amore, et observantia, plusquam cognatione, devinctus posuit. Jn Swete de Oxton

From this bequest John Tripe came into possession of an estate on the Island of Antigua and the Swete family's estate of Train in the parish of Modbury in Devon. The Swete arms appear on a modern escutcheon with the date "1472" sculpted above an archway in a stone wall at Traine House. He also owned Moreleigh Court in the parish of Moreleigh.

Swete owned estates including Oxton, Kenton, his main residence which he inherited from his father; Poltimore, Farway; and Whitley, Farway.

=== Marriage and children ===
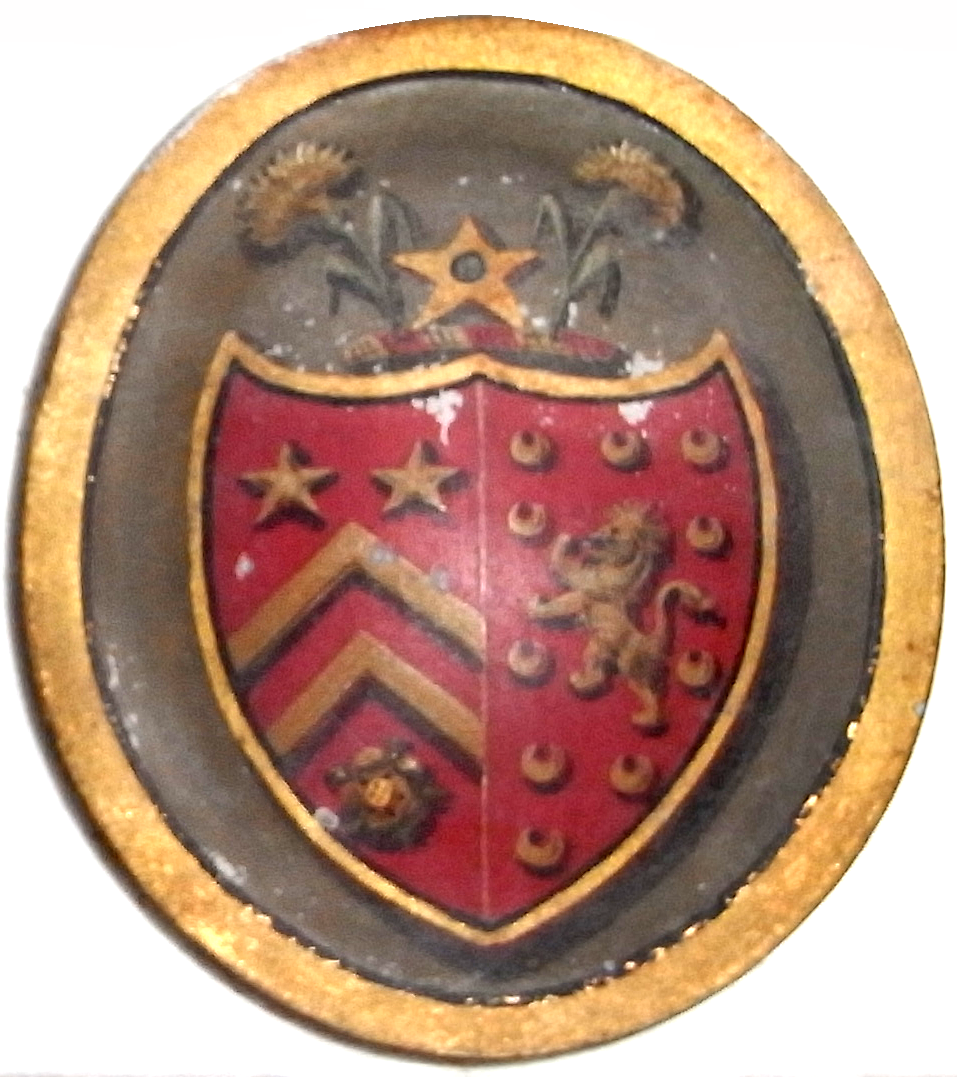
Arms of Swete (Gules, two chevronels between in chief as many mullets or and in base a rose argent seeded of the second) impaling Beaumont of Darton, Yorkshire (Gules, a lion rampant or armed and langued azure an orle of crescents of the second); detail from mural monument to Rev. John Swete in Kenton Church. A funeral hatchment showing the same arms also survives in Kenton Church

On 1 January 1784 in St. Nicholas's Church, Nottingham, Swete married Charlotte Beaumont (1765–1831), whom he had met in Matlock, Derbyshire, 2nd daughter of Rev. George Beaumont (1726–1773), Rector of Gedling, Nottinghamshire, 2nd son of George Beaumont (1696–1735) of The Oaks, Darton, Yorkshire and uncle of Col. Thomas Richard Beaumont (1758–1829) of Hexham Abbey, Northumberland and of Bretton Hall, Wakefield, Yorkshire, MP for Northumberland 1818–26, 1830–37 and MP for Stafford 1827, one of the wealthiest men in England due to his lead-mines and his wife's other inheritances which yielded an annual income of £110,000. Col. Beaumont's descendant was Wentworth Beaumont, 1st Baron Allendale (1829–1907), whose son was Wentworth Beaumont, 1st Viscount Allendale (1860–1923). By his wife Swete had twelve children (of whom four died in infancy) including:

- John Beaumont Swete (1788–1867), eldest son and heir, who married Mary Templer (1794–1886), a daughter of Henry Line Templer (1765–1818), 10th Lt Dragoons, of Lindridge House, Teigngrace, Devon, one of the Prince Regent's household, whose monument exists in Teigngrace Church, by his wife Mary Rogers, daughter of Sir Frederick Leman Rogers, 7th Baronet (1782–1851). He had 15 children some of whom died young and who are commemorated on a mural tablet in Kenton Church. In the early 1830s he effected various remodelling at Oxton, rebuilt by his father who had lavished much of his attention and fortune on house and landscape, but in 1848 sold it to William Studd, whose descendants owned it until 1918, when it was sold to the Earl of Listowel.
- Rev. William Swete, 2nd son, who in 1824 married Mary Anne Gordon (d.1859) (his sister Caroline's sister-in-law), a daughter of David Gordon, 14th Laird of Abergeldie Castle near Aberdeen, in Scotland, by his wife Anne Biddulph. Two of his sisters married two of his wife's brothers.
- Caroline Swete, 5th daughter, who in 1820 married Michael Francis Gordon (1792–1860), 15th Laird of Abergeldie Castle near Aberdeen, in Scotland, son of David Gordon, 14th Laird by his wife Anne Biddulph.
- Susan Swete (d.1861), 6th daughter, who in 1825 married Adam Gordon (both her brother's and her sister's brother-in-law), younger son of David Gordon, 14th Laird of Abergeldie Castle by his wife Anne Biddulph. She was mother to the 17th and 18th Lairds.
- Eliza Swete (1787–1865), who married Revd. Richard Ellicombe and whose mural monument survives in Alphington Church, near Exeter.

=== Death and burial ===
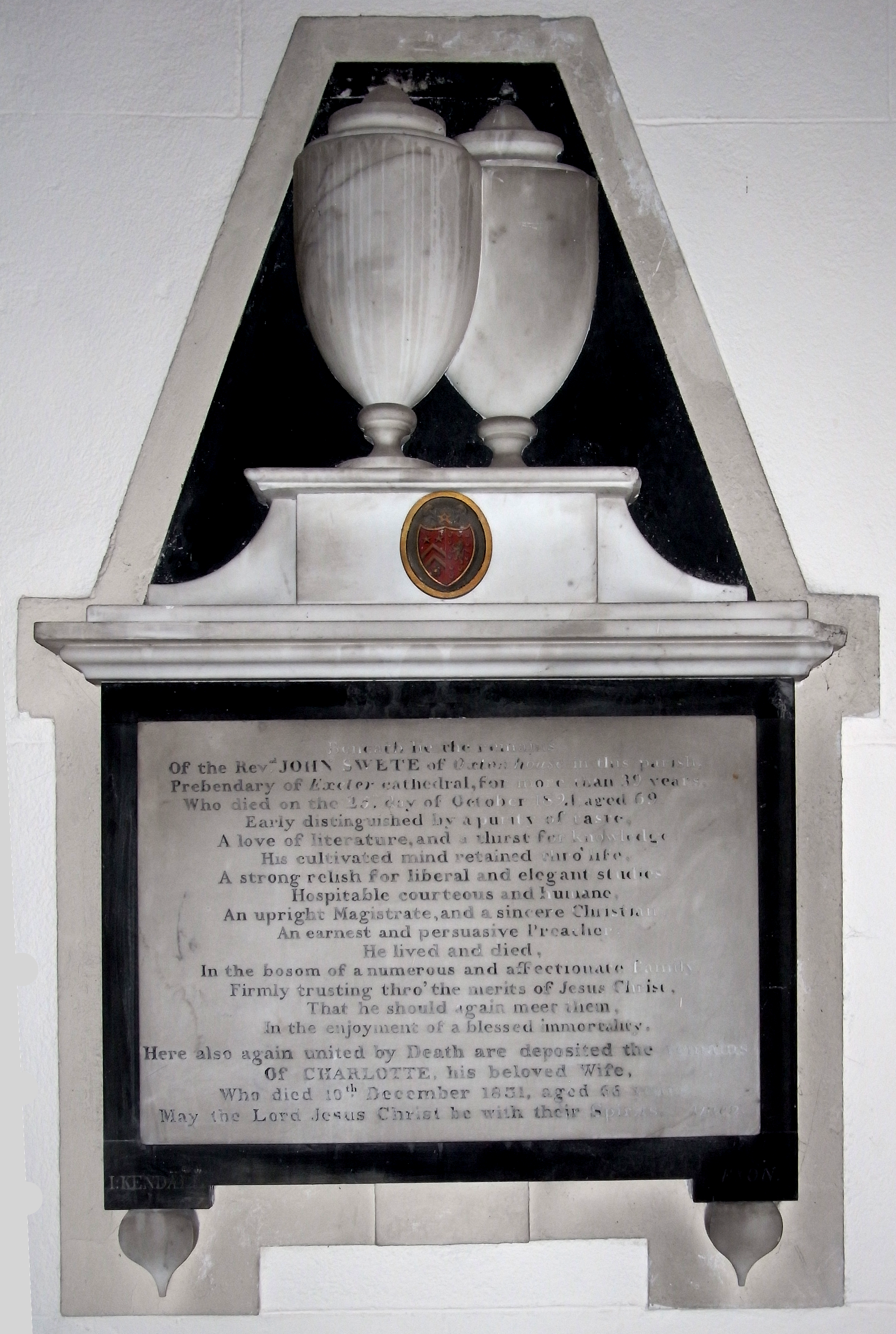
Mural monument to Rev. John Swete in Kenton Church

He died on 25 October 1821 at the age of 69 and was buried in Kenton Church, in the chapel at the east end of the north aisle, where survives his mural monument inscribed as follows:

Beneath lie the remains of the Rev'nd John Swete of Oxton House in this parish, Prebendary of Exeter Cathedral for more than 39 years, who died on the 25th day of October 1821 aged 69. Early distinguished by a purity of taste, a love of literature, and a thirst for knowledge, his cultivated mind retained thro' life a strong relish for liberal and elegant studies. Hospitable, courteous and humane, an upright magistrate and a sincere Christian, an earnest and persuasive preacher. He lived and died in the bosom of a numerous and affectionate family, firmly trusting thro' the merits of Jesus Christ that he should again meet them in the enjoyment of a blessed immortality. Here also again united by Death are deposited the remains of Charlotte his beloved wife who died 10th December 1831 aged 66 years. May the Lord Jesus Christ be with their Spirits. Amen.

== Published works ==
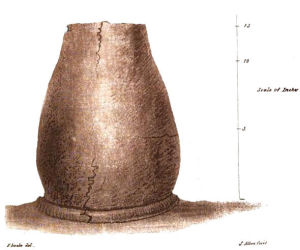
1796 watercolour by John Swete of a prehistoric urn discovered in a barrow on Haldon Hill in 1780

Swete and his neighbour the historian Richard Polwhele were members of the Exeter Literary Society. In 1793 Swete gave a presidential address, that was published in 1796 in three parts in Essays, by a Society of Gentlemen. The first part, titled "On some of the more remarkable British Monuments in Devon", combined a description of a visit to Spinsters' Rock (a dolmen at Drewsteignton), with an account of the discovery by Swete and his father of prehistoric urns in barrows on Haldon Hill. The other two parts were "Of Sepulture in general, and Sepulural Stones erect" and "On the Valley of the Stones, and the country near Linton".

Swete contributed material used by Polwhele in his Historical Views of Devonshire (1793) and History of Devonshire (1793–1806) and he also gave some literary assistance to editions of Prince's Worthies of Devon (1810) and Risdon's Survey of Devon (1811). Swete contributed three poems to Polwhele's Traditions and Recollections (2 vols, 1826) and seven poetical pieces to Polwhele's Poems, Chiefly by Gentlemen of Devonshire and Cornwall (1792). In addition to contributions to published works Swete wrote several unpublished journals and books including an autobiography and six volumes of poetry. It is estimated that there are nearly 1000 watercolours by Swete in public ownership. These works are held mostly by the Devon Record Office with some in the Exeter Royal Albert Memorial Museum.

=== Picturesque Sketches of Devon ===
His inherited wealth enabled him to resign his curacy at Kenn and embark on a series of tours. In April 1773 he set out on a tour of Wales, the Lake District and Scotland. It had been his intention to go on a tour of Europe but instead he met Charlotte Beaumont in Matlock, Derbyshire and they were married in January 1784. They had twelve children of whom four died in infancy. In 1789 Swete set out on the first of his tours of Devon across Dartmoor into North Devon. This was the start of the production of twenty volumes of journals produced up until 1802 which he called Picturesque Sketches of Devon. These were lavishly illustrated with 674 watercolour sketches of the scenery and notable architecture that he encountered on his tours. Swete, usually accompanied by a servant, would travel by horseback and he would take notes and make quick preliminary drawings on the way. After each tour he would spend months at Oxton House producing the final water colour sketches. The journals documented the landscape of Devon and discussed diverse issues from techniques in landscape gardening, industry and mining, archaeology and any curiosities that Swete encountered.

The journals were not published in full during Swete's lifetime but remained in the possession of the family. The sections relating to Torquay were published in the Torquay Directory in 1871 and the Tour Across Dartmoor in to North Devon, the first tour, was finally published in full in 1901 in Devon Notes & Queries. During the Second World War four of the journals were destroyed during German bombing of Exeter, but the surviving handwritten Illustrated Journals of the Reverend John Swete were donated to the Devon Record Office in 1959. Five of the journals were published in 1984 as part of Peter Hunt's Devon's Age of Elegance. Nearly 200 years after they were originally produced the journals were transcribed and published in full for the first time in 1997, under the editorship of Todd Gray in the four volume Travels in Georgian Devon: The Illustrated Journals of the Reverend John Swete, 1789–1800. One of the objects of the publication, an expensive undertaking financed by subscription and containing high quality reproductions of the several hundred of Swete's watercolours, was to preserve the originals from wear and tear.

== Gallery ==
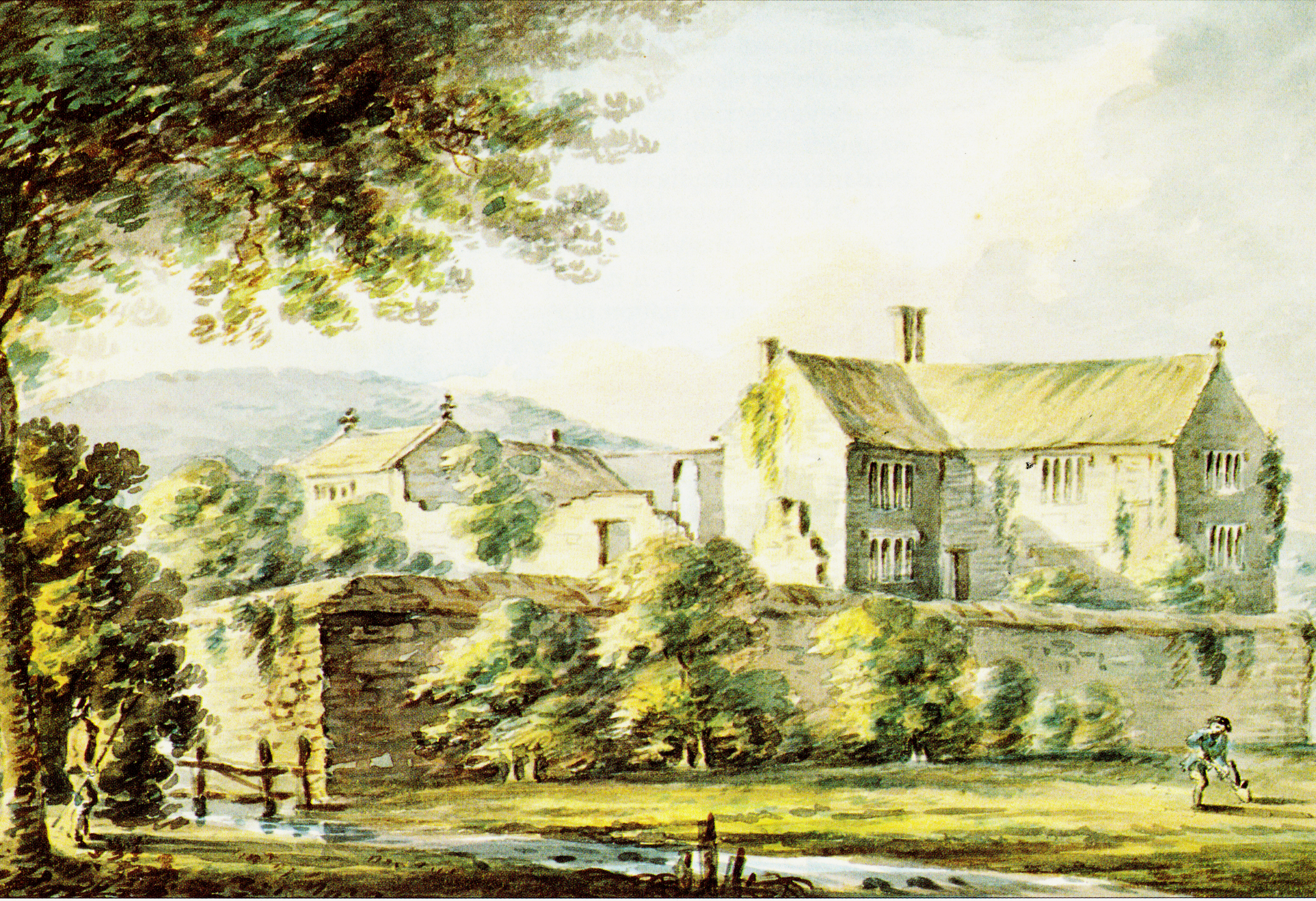
"Ash, antient seat of the Drakes", watercolour dated 13 February 1795 by Rev. John Swete (1752–1821) of Oxton House, Devon. Devon Record Office 564M/F7/129. It was then in use as a farmhouse. This is the house re-built by Sir John Drake, 2nd Baronet (1647–1684) after its near destruction during the Civil War. The building at left is a chapel

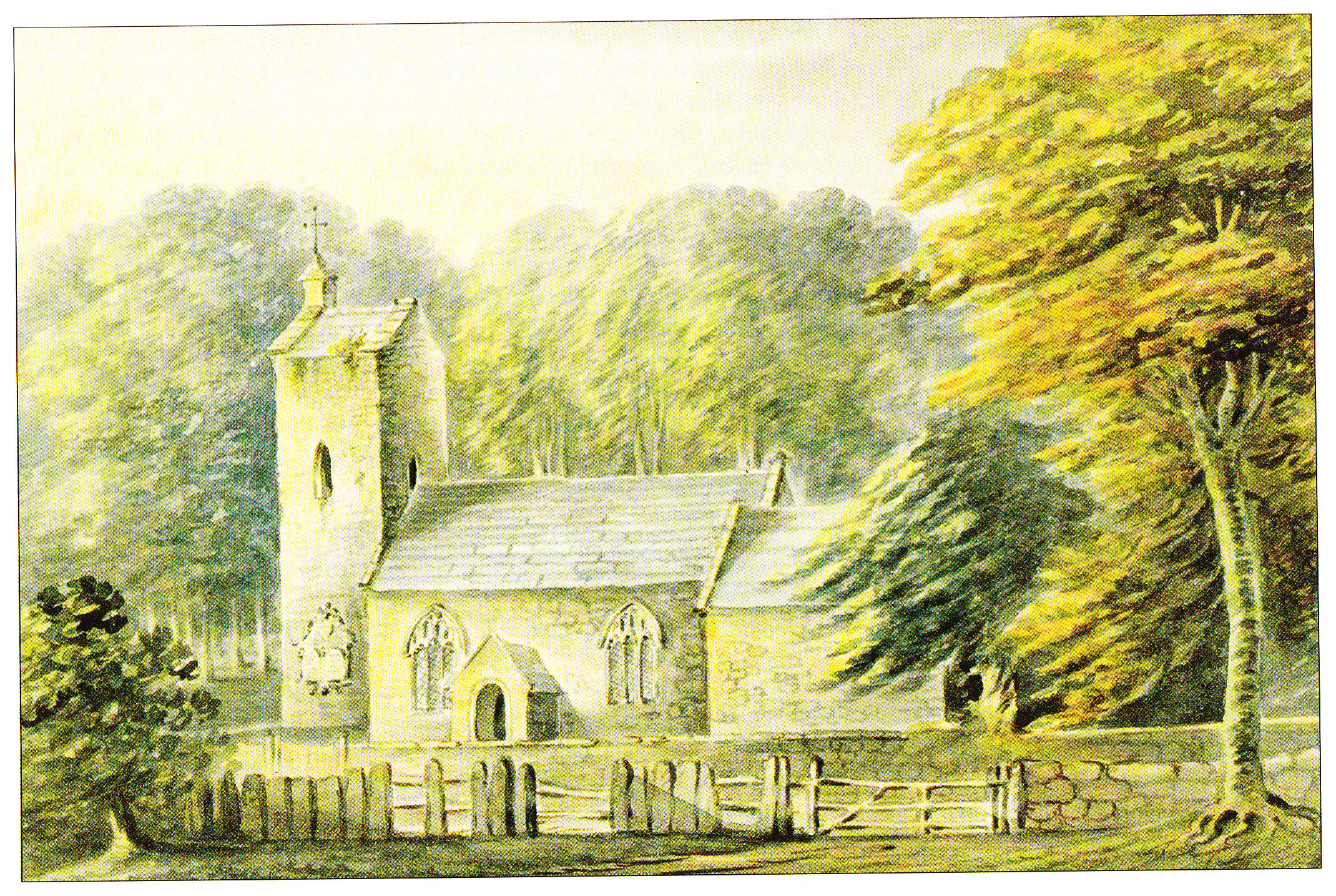
Old Bicton Church, Bicton, Devon, 1795, viewed from south. Watercolour by Rev. John Swete (1752–1821) with caption: "Bicton Church, 31 March 1795". Devon Record Office, 564M/F8/26

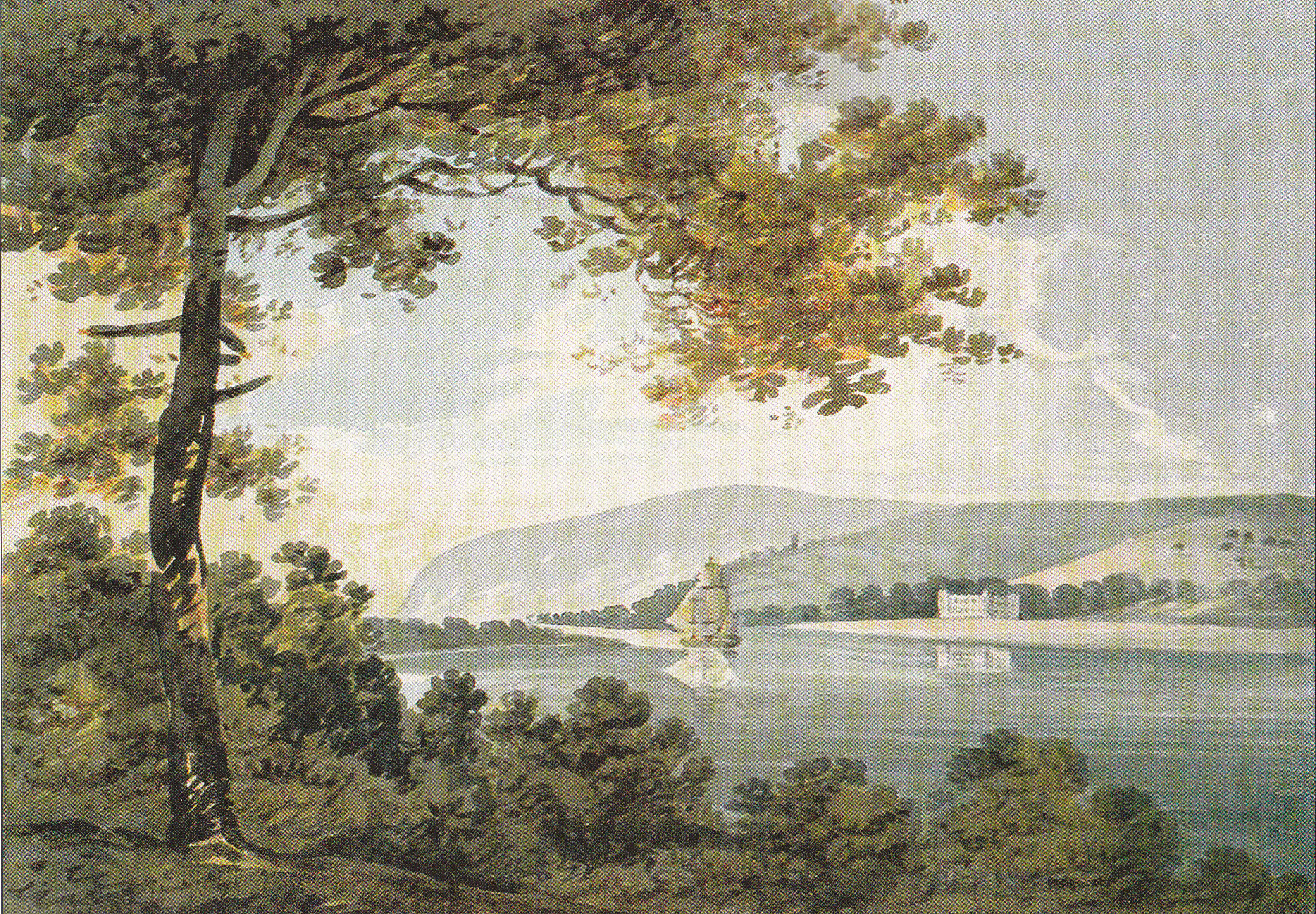
Heanton Court, Heanton Punchardon, nr Barnstaple, Devon. Painted by Rev. John Swete in 1796, copied by him from a painting by "Mr Payne"

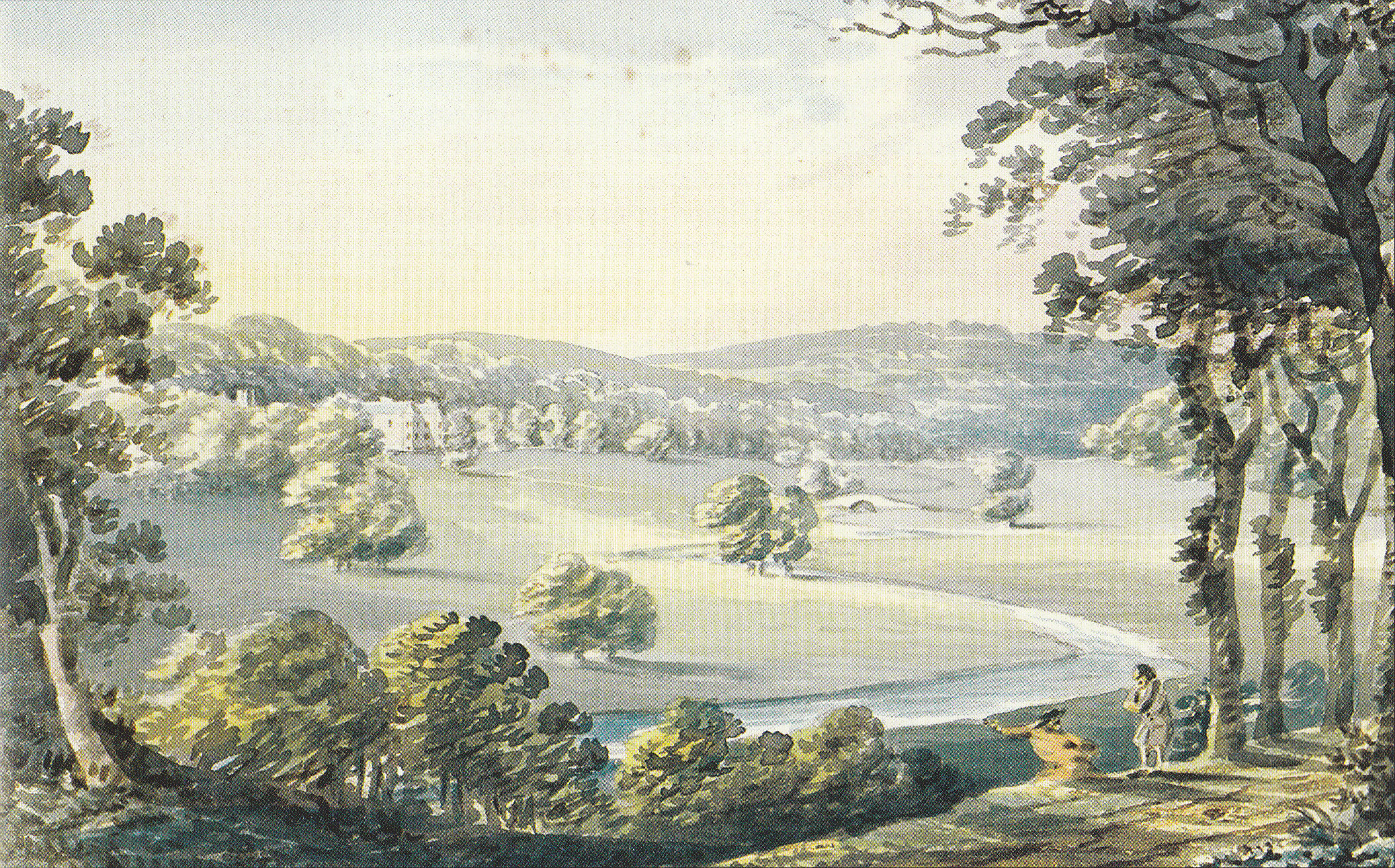
"North East View of Eggesford" dated 1797, watercolour by Rev. John Swete. Devon Record Office ref: 564M/F11/99

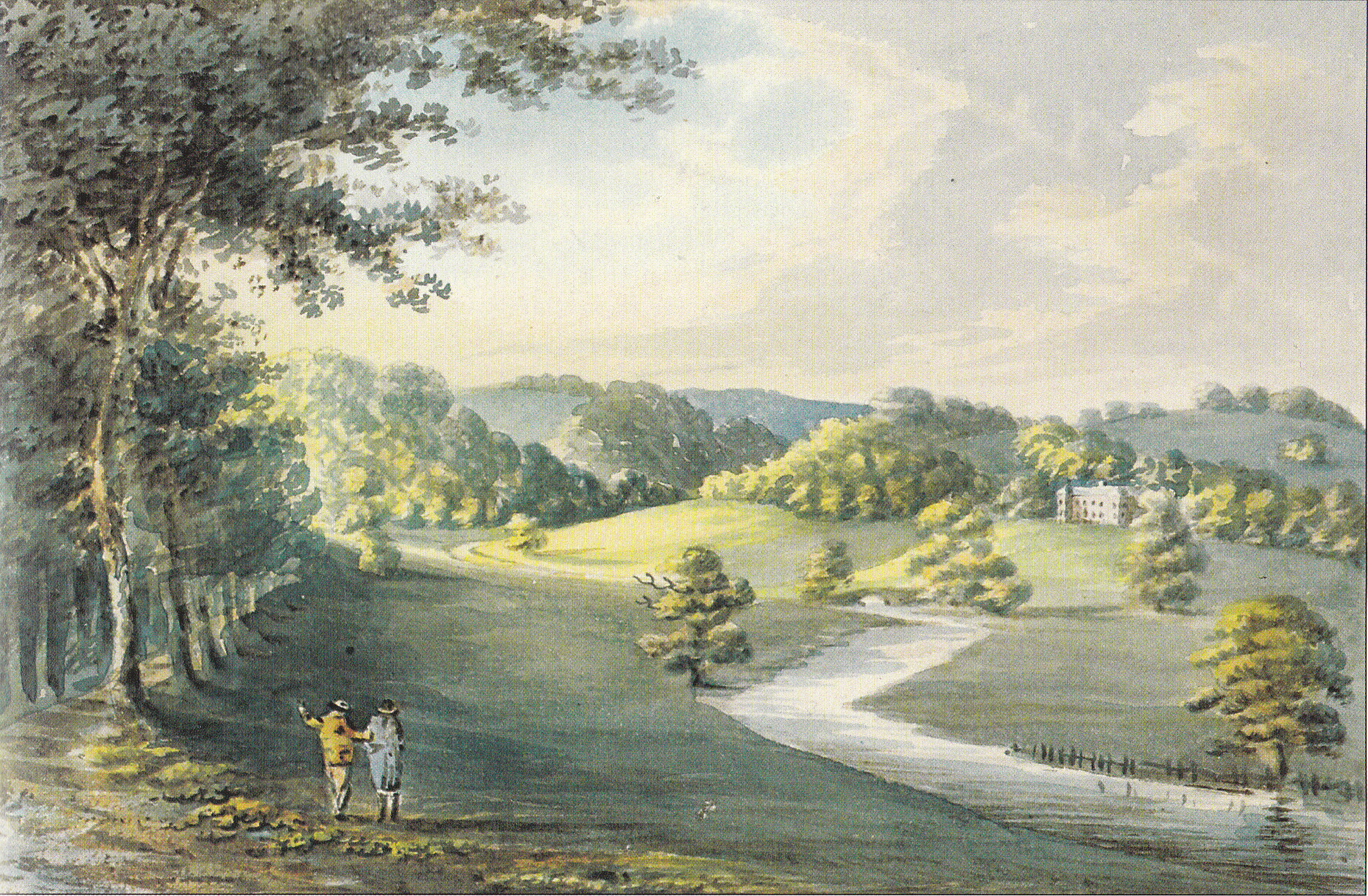
"Eggesford, Seat of Hon. Newton Fellowes", viewed from NW, watercolour by Rev. John Swete dated 1797. Devon Record Office 564M/F11/111
