= Oxton, Kenton =

Historic estate in Devon, England

Coordinates: 50.6322°N 3.5213°W

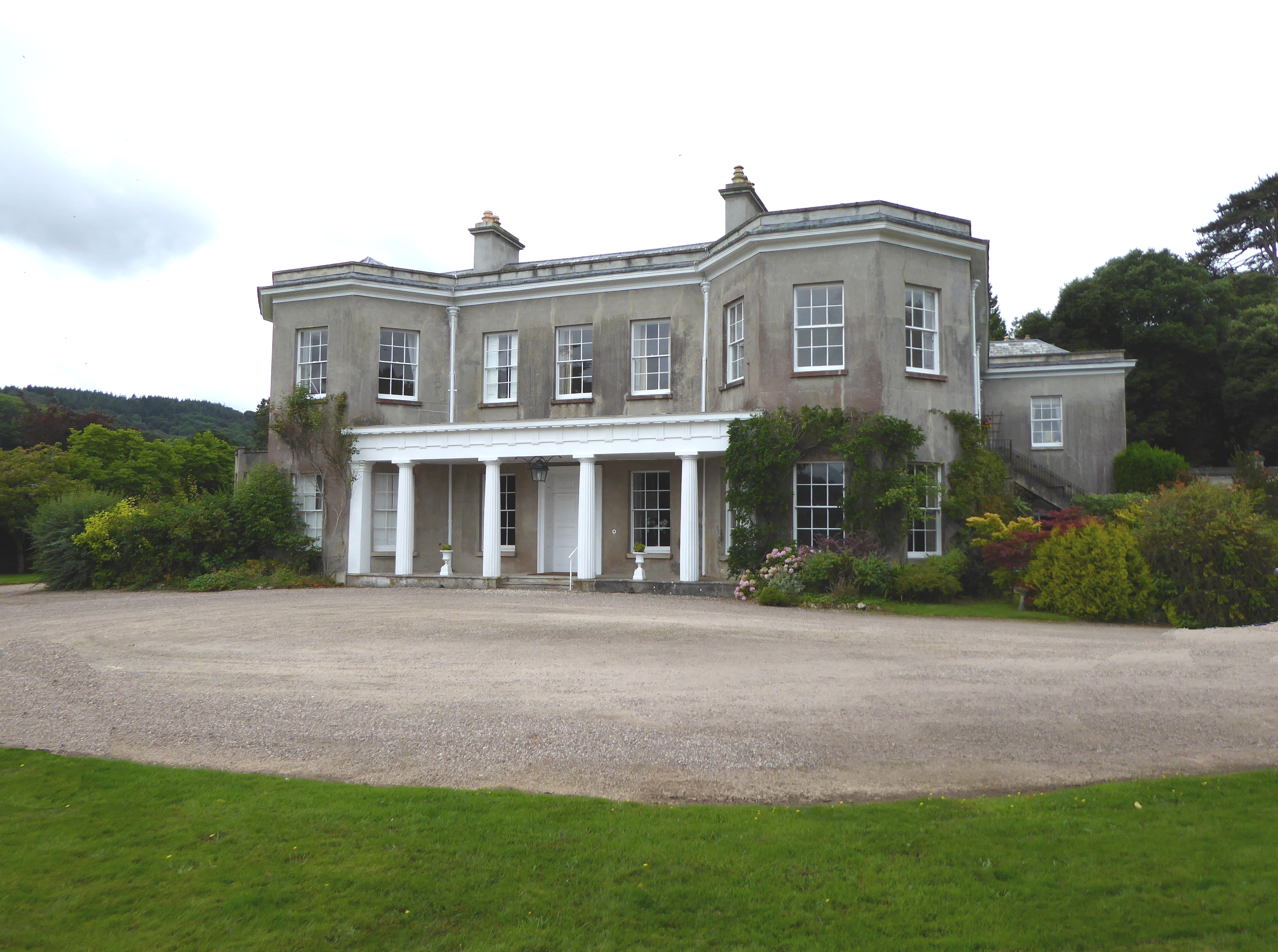
Oxton House, east front

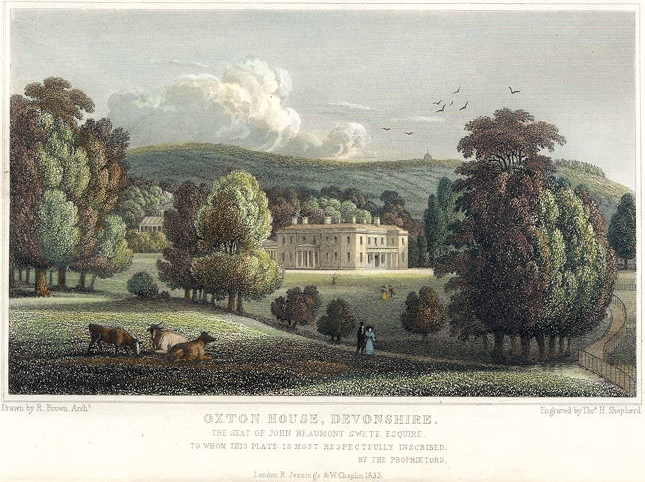
"Oxton House, Devonshire, the seat of John Beaumont Swete, Esquire". 1830 engraving by Thomas Shepherd. As rebuilt in 1781 by his father Rev. John Swete (d.1821). View from south-east. The bridge over the stream (bottom right) is the site of the present decorative white cast iron bridge.

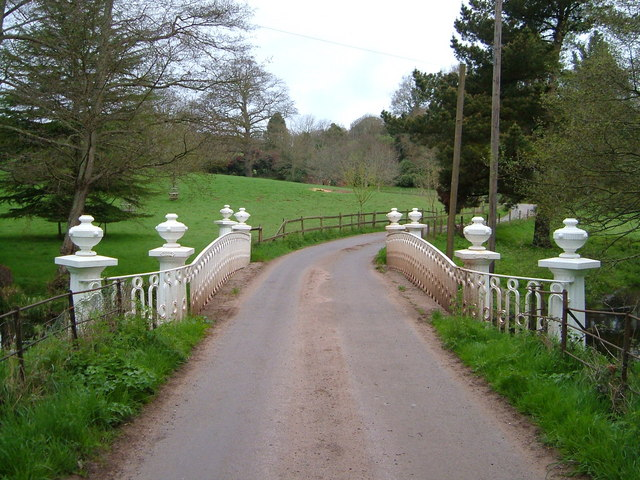
"White Bridge", early 19th century cast iron bridge across stream, entrance drive to Oxton House

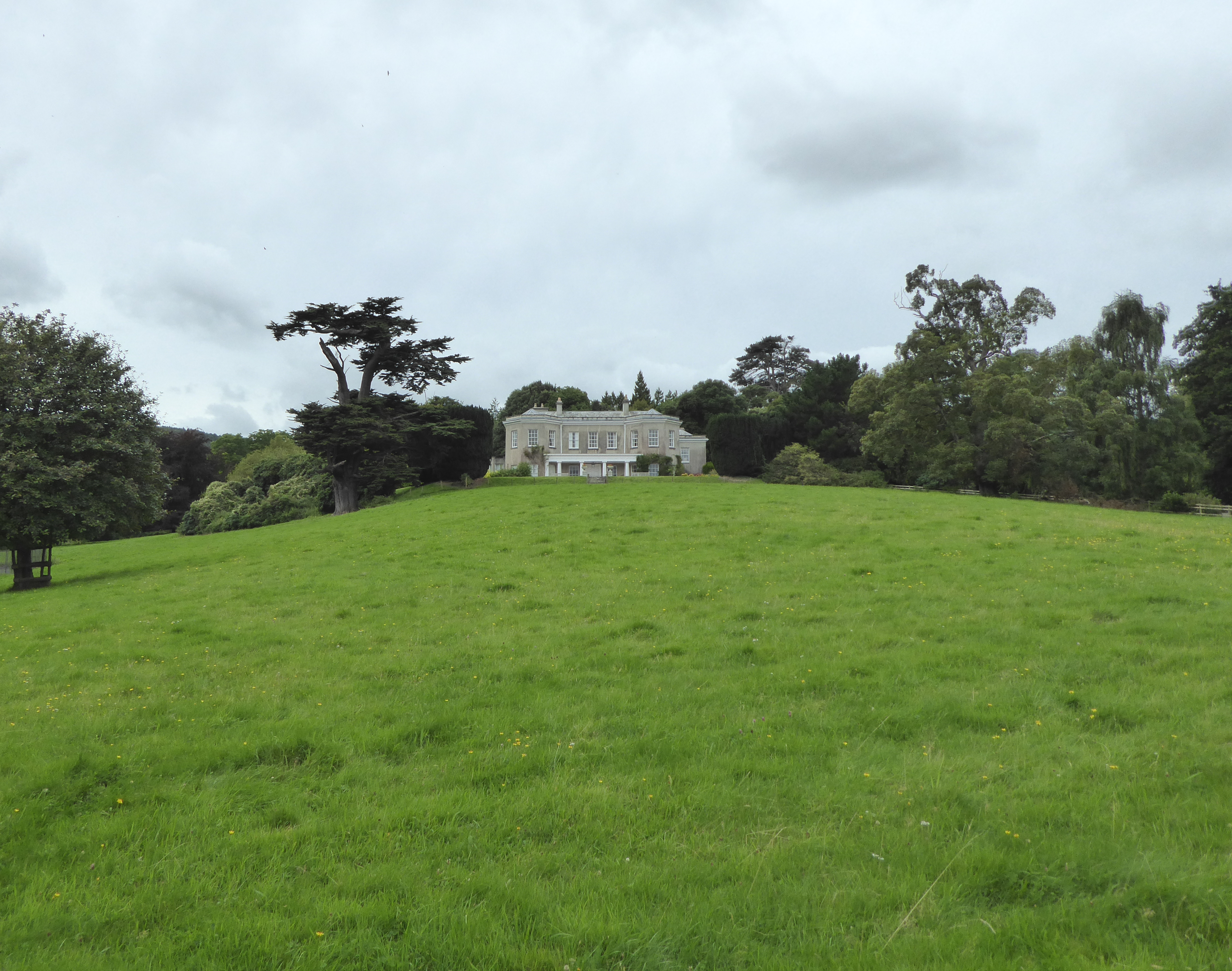
Oxton House, panorama from east

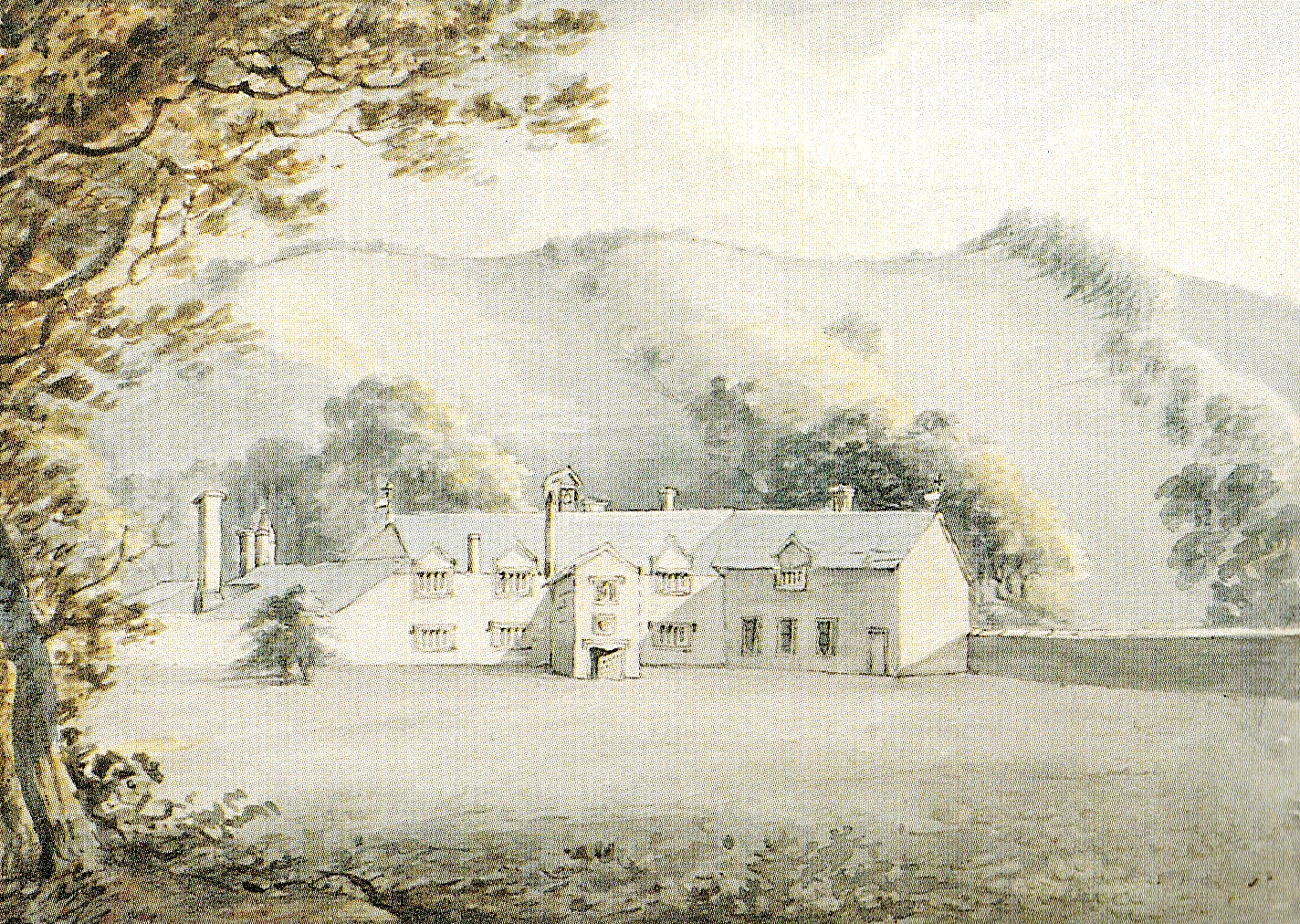
Old Oxton House, painted in 1781 by Rev. John Swete (d.1821), who demolished it in the same year and replaced it with the present Georgian style building

Oxton in the parish of Kenton in South Devon is a historic estate long held by the Martyn family, a junior branch of the Norman family of FitzMartin, feudal barons of Barnstaple.

Oxton House is a Grade II listed building. The park and gardens are Grade II listed in the National Register of Historic Parks and Gardens.

== Features ==
- Hermitage. Rev. Swete created a Gothic hermitage within a quarry on the estate, now a Grade II listed structure. It comprises a chamber with a small window with bench and pillow cut from the stone, reached by an arched entrance.
- A picturesque ruined Gothic arch was built by Rev. Swete to the north of the lodge in about 1790, but was demolished in the mid 20th century.

== Descent ==
=== Martyn ===
The later descent of Martyn of Oxton is as follows:

- Sir Nicholas Martyn (1593–1654) of Oxton, MP for Devon (1646–1654) and Sheriff of Devon in 1640, whose monument survives in Kenton Church.
- William Martyn (1626–1662) of Netherexe and Oxton (son)
- Nicholas Martyn (1652–1717) of Netherexe and Oxton (son). He married Gertrude St Aubyn, daughter of John St Aubyn of Clowance, Cornwall.
- William Martyn (1680–1710) of Oxton, eldest son and heir. He inherited the estate of Holnicote in Somerset from his great-aunt Susannah Martyn (died 1685), a daughter of Sir Nicholas Martyn (1593–1654) and wife of Charles Staynings (1622–1700) of Holnicote. In 1705 William Martyn married a certain Susannah (d.1749).
- William Clifford Martyn (1706–1770), of Oxton, eldest son and heir, who married Elizabeth Langton (d.1753). The marriage was without progeny and on the death of William in 1770 his heir became his first cousin Nicholas II Tripe (1711–1790) of Ashburton, who actually became possessed of Oxton in 1767, according to his son Rev. Jonh Swete (d.1821).

=== Tripe/Swete ===
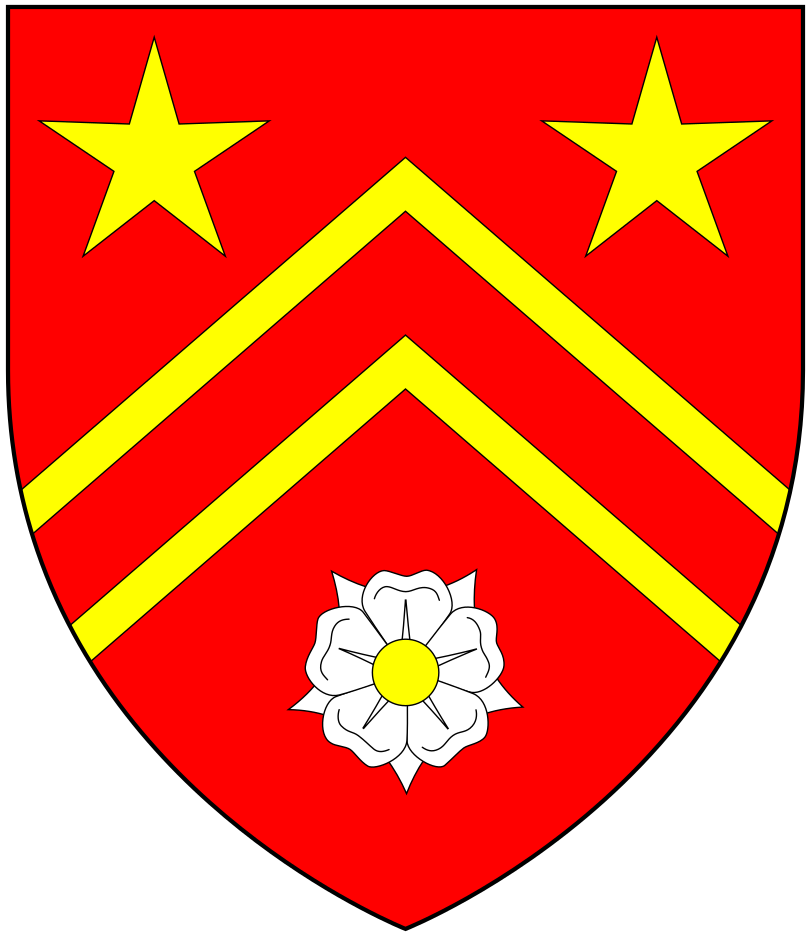
Arms of Swete: Gules, two chevronels between in chief as many mullets or and in base a rose argent seeded of the second

- Nicholas II Tripe (1711–1790) of Ashburton, was a surgeon and was the son of Nicholas I Tripe (d.1718), Vicar of Chudleigh, Devon, by his wife Susannah Martyn (1681–1727), second daughter of Nicholas Martyn (1652–1717) of Oxton by his wife Gertrude St Aubyn. He became possessed of Oxton in 1767, being the heir of his cousin William Clifford Martyn (1706–1770). He married Rebecca Yarde, daughter of Gilbert Yarde by his wife Rebecca Washer.
- Rev John Swete (1752–1821), of Oxton, eldest son and heir, born John Tripe, "a travelling observer of the picturesque", a classical scholar, poet, connoisseur of landscaping, a competent landscape artist and a topographer of Devon. He moved into Oxton in 1775 and resided there for six years at which point as he reminisced in 1792:

"In the year 1781 I took down the old edifice...and on the self same spot I erected the present house - doing this not without due deliberation, for I then thought it was the most eligible situation on the estate, and after a lapse of ten years I think the same".

He thus demolished the old mansion house, which he recorded in a watercolour, and built a new Georgian one on the same site.

- John Beaumont Swete (1788–1867), eldest son and heir, who married Mary Templer (1794–1886), a daughter of Henry Line Templer (1765–1818), 10th Lt Dragoons, of Lindridge House, Teigngrace, Devon (which coincidentally was an ancient seat of the Martyn family), one of the Prince Regent's household, whose monument exists in Teigngrace Church, by his wife Mary Rogers, daughter of Sir Frederick Leman Rogers, 7th Baronet (1782–1851). He had 15 children some of whom died young and who are commemorated on a mural tablet in Kenton Church. In the early 1830s he effected various remodelling at Oxton, but in 1848 sold it to Lt. General Edward Mortlock Studd.

=== Studd ===
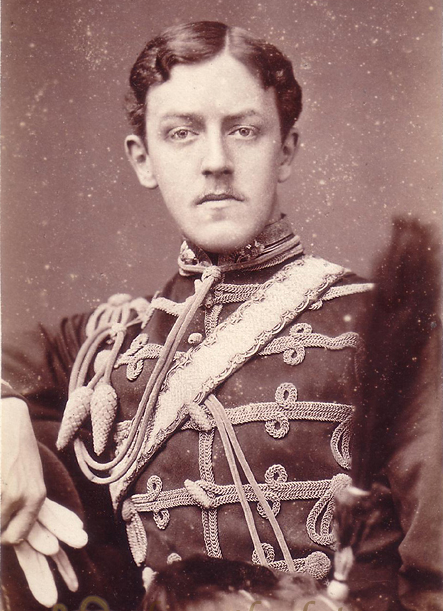
"Sub-Lieutenant Studd, 15th Hussars", Carte-de-Visite, Studio Owen Angel, Exeter. Alnod Ernest Studd (1857–1906) was the 2nd son of Lt. General Edward Mortlock Studd (1799–1877), of Oxton House

In 1848 Oxton was purchased by Lt. General Edward Mortlock Studd (1799 – 6 December 1877), of Oxton, J.P. and Deputy Lieutenant for Devon, Sheriff of Devon in 1862. He was the eldest son of Edward Studd (d.1813), descended from the 14th century family of Studd (alias Stote) of Drinkstone in Suffolk, an officer of the East India Company. Edward Mortlock Studd married firstly Mary Spurrier in 1820 & secondly Emma Beatrice Bayly, daughter of Lt. Charlton Booth Bayly, Royal Navy, of Sidmouth, Devon on 15 February 1855 at Holy Trinity, Paddington, London, by whom he had a son and heir Edward Fairfax Studd (1855–1942), of Oxton, a barrister, JP and Captain in the Royal Field Artillery, who married Evelyn Chichester (born 1854), 3rd daughter of Sir Arthur Chichester, 8th Baronet, Colonel of the North Devon Yeomanry Cavalry, of Youlston Park, Sherwell, North Devon. He also resided nearby at Exleigh, Starcross, Devon. The Lt. General's 2nd son was Alnod Ernest Studd (1857–1906), a distinguished chess player, who after a brief military career in the 15th Hussars (1875–1879) became bankrupt in 1901 through speculation on the Stock Exchange in 1882 and from a failed investment in 1891 in a coffee estate at Bundara, Mysore, India. The Studd family owned Oxton until about 1915, when it was sold to Joshua John Neale.

=== Neale ===
Joshua John Neale purchased Oxton in about 1915. He was a fish merchant and ship owner of Irish origin who in 1885 together with Henry West founded a fishmongery business in Custom House Street, Cardiff. In 1888 with West he established the Neale & West Trawler Co. In 1899 he resided at Park Road, Penarth, Glamorgan. On 6 February 1899 a steamship he half-owned named "Ramsey", registered at Cardiff, was stranded and lost on the Wolves Rocks in the Bristol Channel. In 1920 "Joshua John Neale of Oxton, Kenton, near Exeter" was listed as a County Magistrate for Dinas Powis Petty Sessional Division, in Glamorgan, Wales. He was a student of archaeology and a naturalist and was author of "The Birds of Ireland", written before 1902 and gave a speech in Cardiff in 1917 entitled "The Survival of the Unfittest". He was a close friend of Robert Drane (d.1914), a pharmacist from Swansea who was a founding member of the Cardiff Naturalists Society in 1867, and at sometime its president, who discovered the Skomer Vole, was an authority on porcelain and was honorary curator of Cardiff Museum. A 1913 photograph of Neale and Drane exists in the Glamorgan Archives, together with correspondence between the two men. More than 100 photographs of Oxton House and grounds at this time survive in the Neale family papers.

=== Hare ===
In about 1925 Oxton was purchased by Richard Granville Hare, 4th Earl of Listowel (1866–1931), whose father the 3rd Earl had died in 1924.

== Later history ==
From 1938 to 1966 Oxton was used as Bletchington House School, a girls' boarding school.

The house was sold in 1966 and then divided into apartments for multiple occupancy.
