= Little Haldon Heaths =

Protected area in Devon, England

Coordinates: 50.579103°N 3.5281313°W

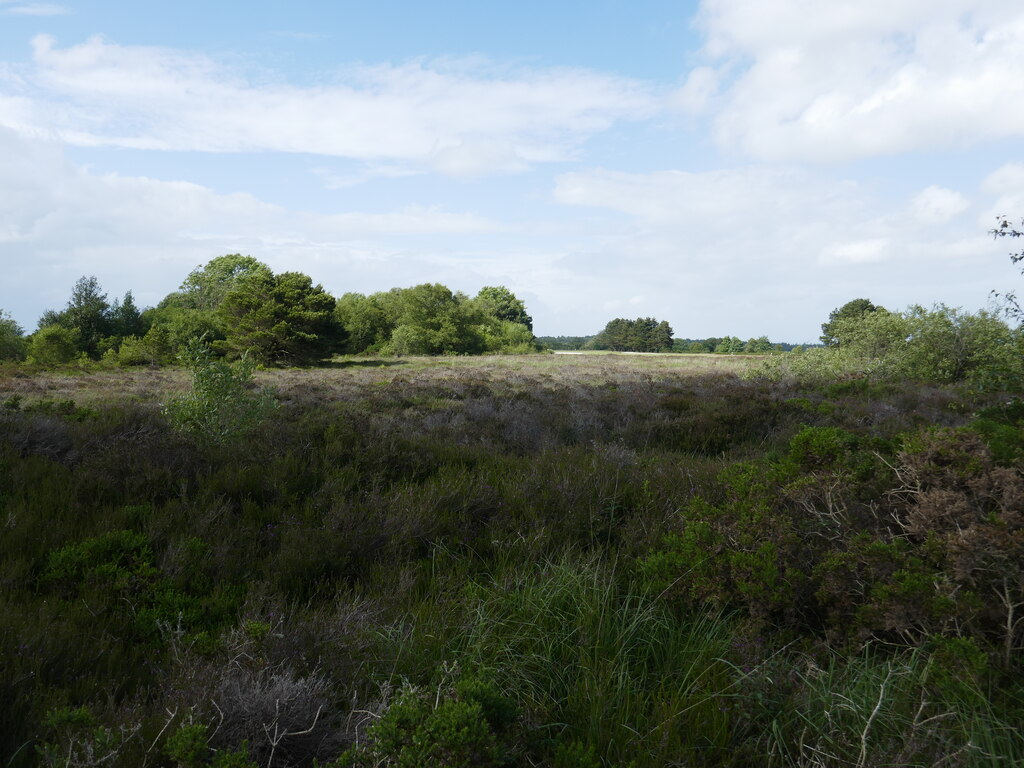
Little Haldon Heath

Little Haldon Heaths is a Site of Special Scientific Interest (SSSI) in Devon, England. It is located 3km northwest of the town of Teignmouth. This area is protected because of its heathland habitat where nightjars and lizards have been recorded.

This protected area includes the site of Haldon Aerodrome that closed in 1968.

== Biology ==
Little Haldon Heaths has extensive coverage of mature heathland where heather, bell heather and western gorse dominate the vegetation. Cross-leaved heath, bilberry and tormentil have been recorded here.

There is a patch of woodland within this protected area that is dominated by pedunculate oak and ash trees. Herb species include yellow archangel, opposite-leaved golden saxifrage, hemlock water-dropwort and marsh violet. Scaly male-fern has also been recorded in this protected area.

Birds recorded in this protected area include nightjar and stonechat. Reptiles recorded here include adder and common lizard.

== Geology ==
The soils are very acidic. There are patches of flint gravels in this protected area.

== Land ownership ==
Part of Little Haldon Heaths SSSI is owned by the National Trust.
