= Sheela Balaji =

Indian leader who has preserved rice varieties

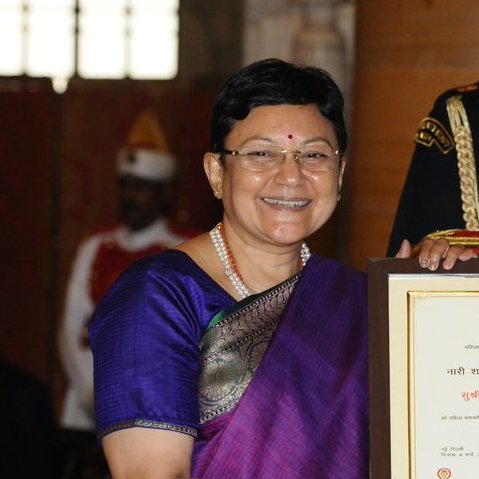
- Education: Stella Maris College
- Occupation: Managing trustee of an NGO
- Employer: AIM For Seva
- Known for: preserving rice varieties
- Spouse: T. K. Balaji
- Parent(s): T. S. Srinivasan, Prema Srinivasan
- Relatives: TVS family Venu Srinivasan (brother); T. V. Sundram Iyengar (grandfather)

Sheela Balaji leads the Indian educational nonprofit organization (NGO) AIM For Seva. She is the recipient of the Nari Shakti Puraskar award. She is the grand-daughter of T. V. Sundram Iyengar.

== Life ==
Balaji is the managing trustee and chair of AIM For Seva which runs a large school in Manjakkudi in Tamil Nadu and also has 100 hostels across India. She is also responsible for the Swami Dayananda Educational Trust.

She started plantation of indigenous varieties of rice . In 2011, her book Swami Dayananda Saraswati: Contributions & Writings, was published.

In 2013, Balaji organized a festival in Manjakkudi dedicated to grains, which led to the rediscovery of old rice varieties. In 2015, her book Without a Second: Concepts of Non Duality was published.

In 2018, Balaji was awarded the Nari Shakti Puraskar. The award was invested by President of India Ram Nath Kovind at the Presidential Palace (Rastrapati Bhavan) in New Delhi with the Prime Minister of India, Narendra Modi, also attending. About 40 people or organisations were honoured that year, receiving the award and a prize of $R 100,000.
