= Sudarshan Venu =

Indian businessman

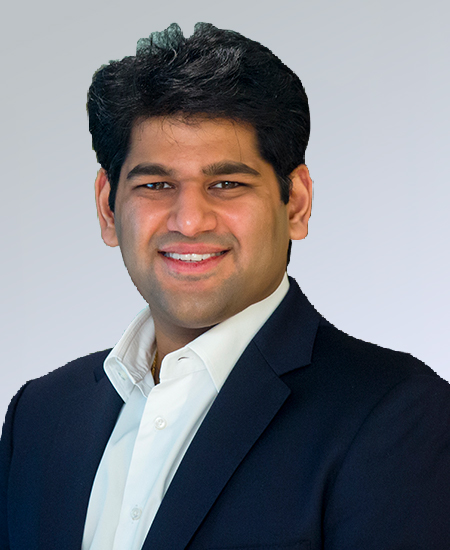
- Sudarshan Venu
- Born: 1 February 1989 (age 37)
- Education: University of Pennsylvania, Wharton School, University of Warwick
- Occupations: Entrepreneur, Business executive
- Known for: Chairman of TVS Motor Company
- Title: Chairman of TVS Motor, Managing Director of TVS Holdings
- Spouse: Tara Sam (m. 2014)
- Parents: Venu Srinivasan (father); Mallika Srinivasan (mother)
- Relatives: Lakshmi Venu (sister)
- Family: TVS family
- Awards: Young Global Leaders by World Economic Forum (2023)

Sudarshan Venu is an Indian-born Singaporean entrepreneur and business executive, currently serving as the Chairman of TVS Motor Company, a manufacturer of two- and three-wheelers. Additionally, he serves as the Managing Director of TVS Holdings, and heads its affiliated companies, including TVS Credit Services, Home Credit India, and TVS Emerald.

He was named as a Young Global Leaders by the World Economic Forum in 2023 and was included in Fortune India's 40 Under 40 list for 2024 and 2025.

== Early life and education ==
Sudarshan Venu was born on 1 February 1989 in the TVS family to Venu Srinivasan and Mallika Srinivasan. He graduated from the University of Pennsylvania with Mechanical Engineering and Economics degrees.

Sudarshan also holds a postgraduate degree in International Technology Management from the Warwick Manufacturing Group, University of Warwick, UK. During his master's studies, he underwent training at the Die Casting division of Sundaram-Clayton Limited and TVS Motor Company Limited.

== Career ==
Sudarshan's career has been with the TVS Group, a Chennai-based conglomerate founded by his great-grandfather. He joined the board of Sundaram Clayton, the holding company of TVS Motor Company, in 2011 and was appointed Vice President later that year. In 2013, he became a full-time Director of TVS Motor Company.

Sudarshan served as Joint Managing Director of TVS Motor Company from 2014 to 2022.

In 2018, Venu moved to Singapore, where he sought to develop TVS Motor's international business. During his tenure, the company expanded its presence in international markets, including Southeast Asia, Latin America, the Middle East, and Africa, and increased the number of countries in which it operated. Norton had entered administration before being acquired for £16 million. Venu was involved in the revival of the brand following the acquisition. TVS Motor subsequently invested about £200 million in the brand and introduced new models for markets including the United Kingdom, Europe, India and the United States.

In 2020, Venu set up the TVS Venu Group to oversee the businesses he leads, including TVS Motor Company, TVS Credit Services, TVS Emerald and Atelier Expressions.

Before Sudarshan assumed leadership, TVS Motor had a limited presence in the electric vehicle segment, with a market share of around 2% in FY21 and 4% in FY22, while several companies had established an early lead in the sector. Under his leadership, the company expanded into electric mobility with the launch of the TVS iQube Electric, which became one of the leading electric two-wheeler brandsin India, and as of 2025, TVS Motor held a 19% share of the electric two-wheeler market and a 25% share of the scooter market, ranking second after Honda. Sudarshan also focused on premiumisation in the domestic market, with TVS increasing its share in the 150–200 cubic centimetre premium motorcycle segment.

In February 2022, Sudarshan Venu was elected as an Additional Director of Coromandel International for a period of five years. He became the Managing Director of TVS Motor Company in May 2022.

He is also the chairman of TVS Credit Services. He is a member of the Government of India's National Board for Electric Mobility. In August 2023, he was elected as a member of the Board of Trustees for the Tirumala Tirupati Devasthanams Trust. In September 2025, Sudarshan began his second tenure as a member of the Tirumala Tirupati Devasthanams Trust Board, filling the unassumed term of retired judge H.L. Dattu.

In April 2025, Sudarshan Venu became a significant beneficial owner of TVS Holdings following an inter-se transfer of promoter shares. He and his father, Venu Srinivasan, were classified as persons acting in concert and significant beneficial owners of the company.

In August 2025, he was elevated to Chairman of TVS Motor Company, succeeding Ralf Speth. In his tenure, TVS Motor Company overtook Yamaha Motor to become the world's third-largest two-wheeler manufacturer by volume and reported its highest-ever revenue of ₹47,270 crore in FY 2025–26, with operating revenue up 30% year on year.

In FY 2025–26, Venu was among the highest-paid executives in India's automotive industry.

== Personal life ==
Sudarshan married Tara Sam in 2014.

== Awards and recognition ==
In 2012, Venu was included in India Today magazine's "37 Indians of Tomorrow" list, which recognized individuals under 35 across various fields. He was ranked 20th on the list. In 2016, he received the Corporate Citizen of the Year award at the The Economic Times Awards. In 2017, he was included in The Economic Times 40 Under 40 list.

In 2023, the World Economic Forum named Venu a Young Global Leader. In August that year, he received Moneycontrol's Next-Gen Leader of the Year Award at the Indian Family Business Awards. In 2024, he was included in Fortune India's 40 Under 40 list. He was included in the list again in 2025.

In 2025, Venu received the Best CEO award in the Manufacturing and Retail Excellence category at Business Today's BT MindRush. He was also included in Fortune India's India's Best CEOs list in 2025 in the Auto (Two-Wheelers) category.

In December 2025, Autocar Professional named him Person of the Year. In July 2026, Venu appeared on the cover of Forbes Asia magazine.
