= Multipart =

Multipart may refer to:

- a multipart message in the MIME internet format
- Multipart Solutions, a British parts and components supplier
- multipart download or download acceleration
