= Suresh Krishna (businessman) =

Indian industrialist (born 1936)

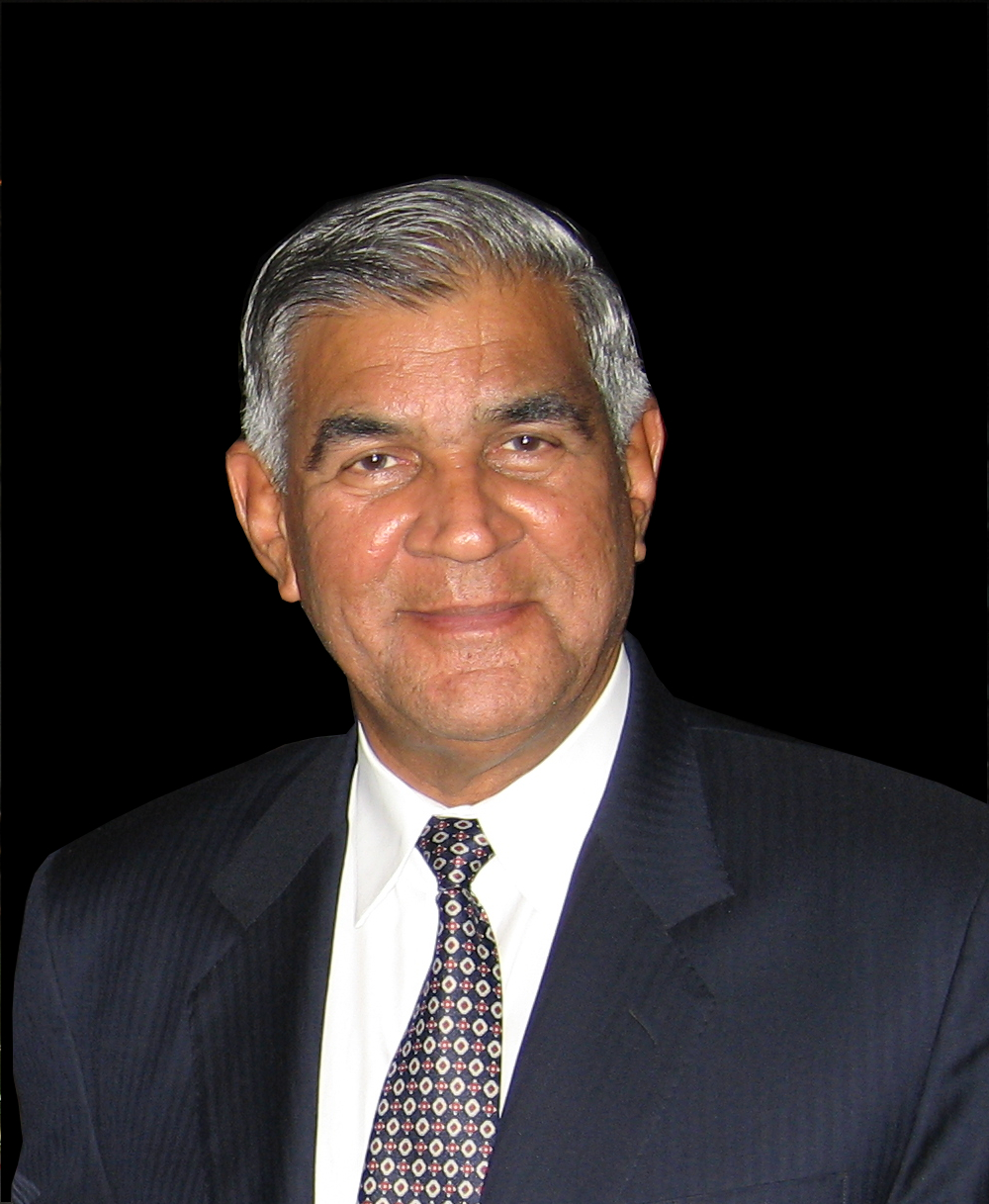
- Born: 24 December 1936 (age 89); Madurai, Madras Presidency, India
- Education: Bachelor of Science (chemistry); M.A., Literature
- Alma mater: Madras Christian College, India; University of Wisconsin, U.S. LMU Munich, Germany
- Occupation: Industrialist
- Title: Chairman
- Spouse: Usha Krishna
- Children: 3
- Mother: Ambujam Krishna
- Relatives: TVS family T V Sundram Iyengar (grandfather)
- Awards: "Sir Jehangir Ghandy Medal for Industrial Peace", "Businessman of the Year 1995", JRD Tata Corporate Leadership Award
- Honours: Padma Shri (2006)
- Website: www.sundram.com

Suresh Krishna, an Indian industrialist, is the Chairman of Sundram Fasteners Limited (SFL), and the Chairman of the holding company, T V Sundram Iyengar & Sons Pvt Ltd.

Suresh Krishna is the grandson of the founder of TVS Group, late Sri T V Sundram Iyengar, and the eldest son of the late Sri T S Krishna.

== Career ==
Currently, SFL has 27 factories including one each in China and the United Kingdom. SFL manufactures a variety of automotive products such as high tensile fasteners, cold extruded parts, sintered metal parts, power train components, radiator caps, wind energy components, hot forged parts, foundry parts, water pumps and oil pumps.

Under his leadership, SFL became the first Indian Engineering company to acquire ISO 9000 certification. It is also the first engineering company in India to achieve Total Productive Maintenance (TPM) Excellence Award.

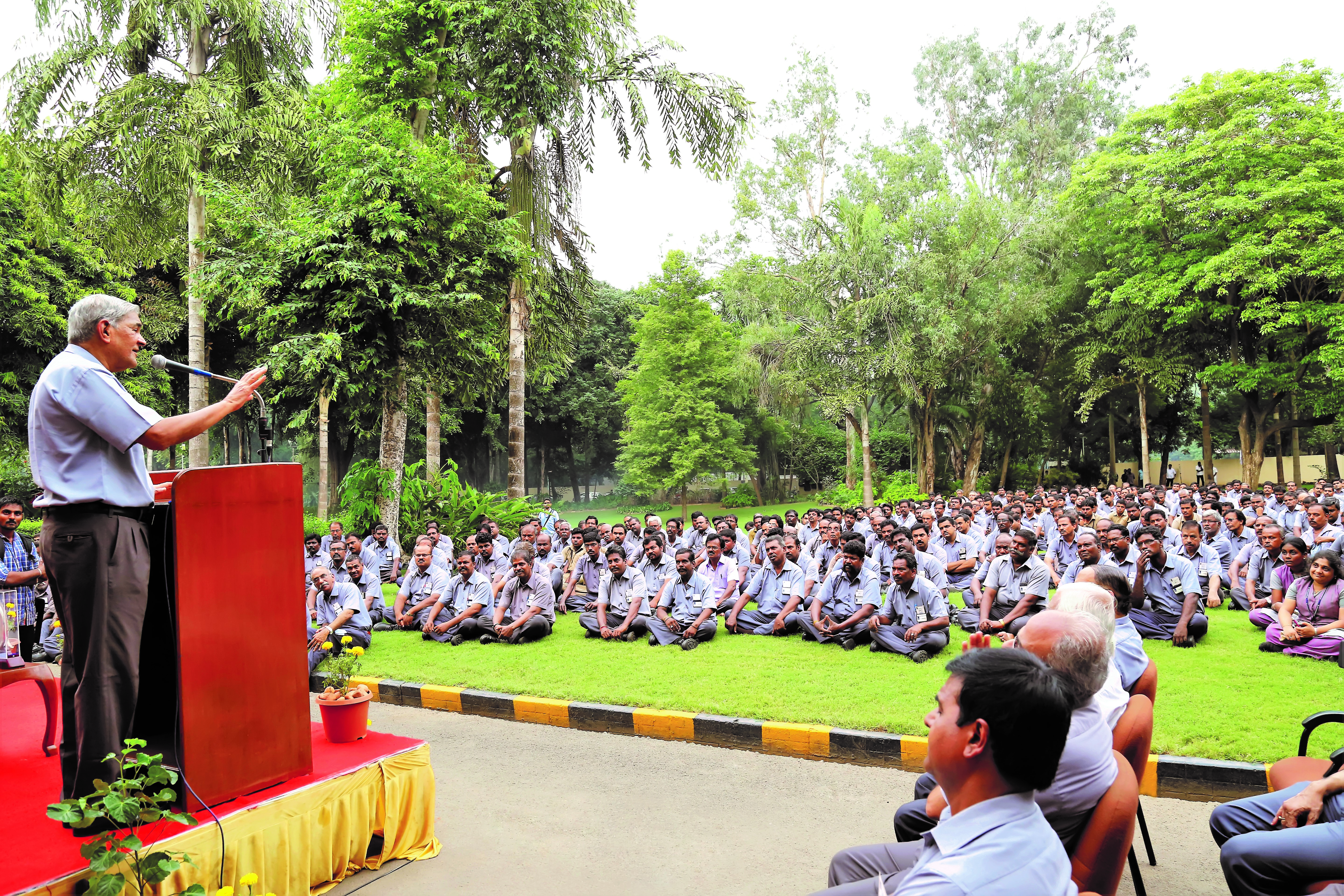
Suresh Krishna sharing his thoughts with employees.

== Net worth ==
Forbes lists his net worth as of April 2022 at $1.1 billion USD.

== Recognition ==
Suresh Krishna served as the President of the Automotive Component Manufacturers Association of India from 1982 to 1984 and as the President of the Confederation of Indian Industry from 1987 to 1988.

He has been board director of several TVS Group companies, as well as for the Industrial Credit & Investment Corporation of India, Tata Steel, Videsh Sanchar Nigam Ltd, Institute for Financial Management & Research, etc.

He was appointed as a Director on the Central Board of the Reserve Bank of India.

== Awards and honours ==
The Government, Business and Industry bodies have recognized Suresh Krishna's contributions.

- 2006 - Padma Shri Award for his contribution to Industry.
- 1997 - Qimpro Platinum Standard for being a role model for Quality Leadership for Corporate India.
- 1998 - Juran Quality Medal by the Indian Merchants Chamber, Mumbai.
- 2000 - JRD Tata Corporate Leadership Award
- 2002 - The Asian Productivity Organization, Japan conferred the Nation Award (for India) on Suresh Krishna for his outstanding contribution towards productivity improvement in the country during the last five years.
- 2001 - Entrepreneur of the Year Award from Ernst & Young
- 2017 - Life Time Achievement Award by the Nanayam Vikatan for his contribution to Industry
- 2019 - Quality Ratna Award

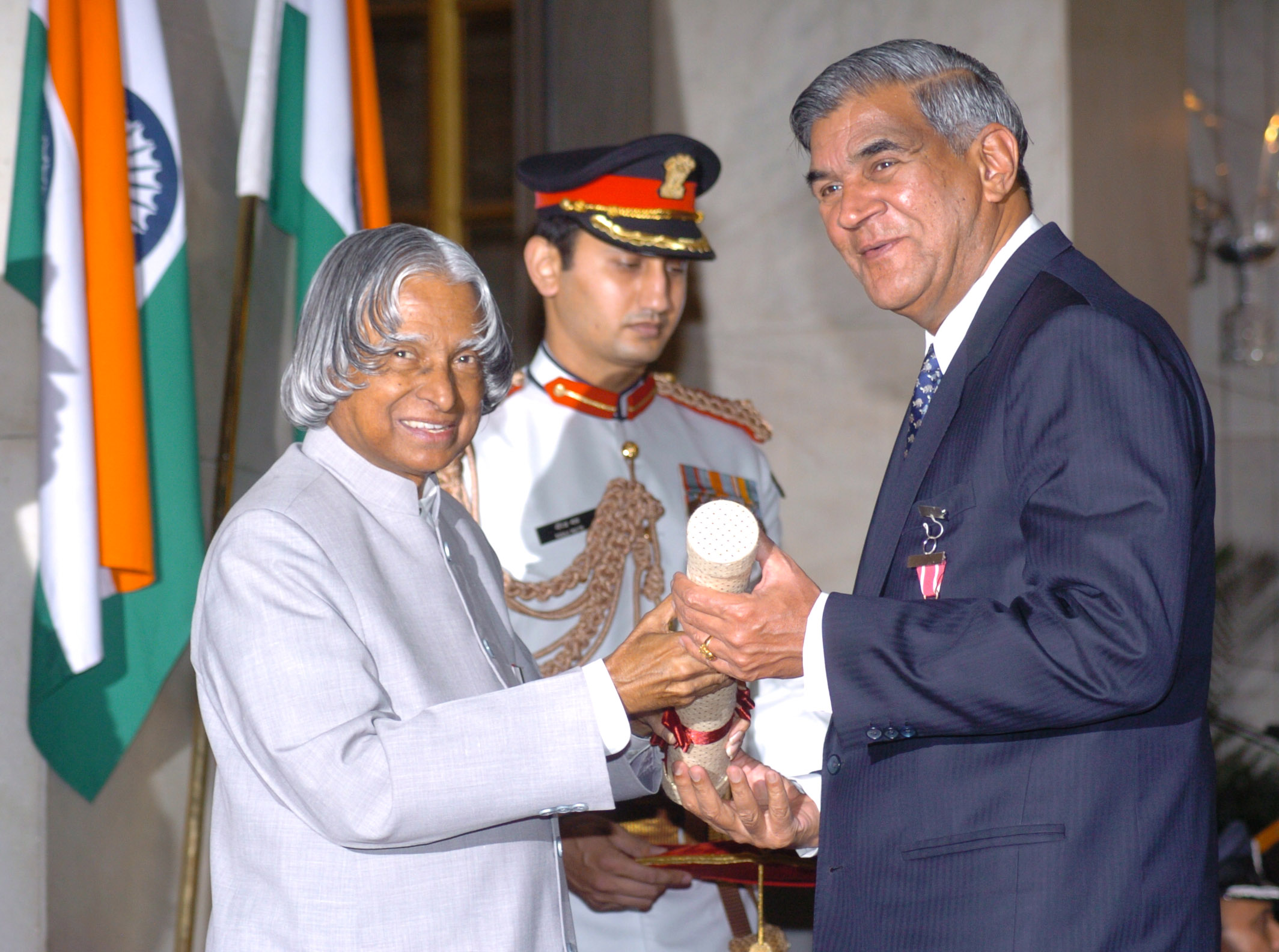
Suresh Krishna receiving Padma Shri from President APJ Abdul Kalam at Rashtrapathi Bhavan on 29.3.2006

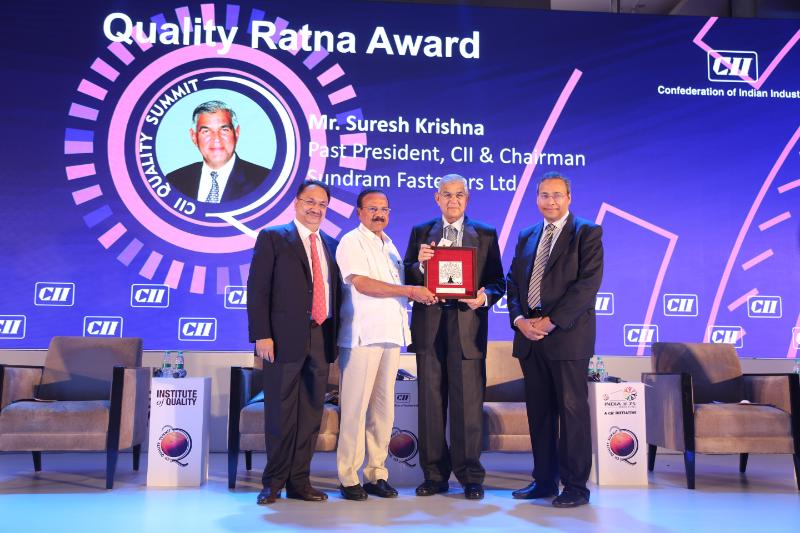
Suresh Krishna receiving India's First Quality Ratna Award
