= Pan Asia Logistics =

- Company type: Private Limited Company
- Industry: Logistics
- Founded: 2002; 24 years ago
- Headquarters: Singapore
- Services: Air freight, Ocean Freight, Contract Logistics
- Website: Official Homepage

Pan Asia Logistics has its headquarters located in Singapore. Services include air freight, ocean freight and logistics.

== History ==
Pan Asia Logistics was founded in Singapore by the German-born Christian Bischoff and the Singaporean Susan Tan. Having previous experience at the German logistics company DB Schenker and Thyssen Haniel, Christian Bischoff started Pan Asia Logistics’ operations in February 2003 and achieved with 50 employees a revenue of $20 million by the end of the year.

== Expansion ==
In the following years the company expanded across the Asian Pacific region and established multiple offices in Singapore, Malaysia, Indonesia, Thailand, South Korea, Hong Kong, China, India, Taiwan, Vietnam, Japan and Germany.

In 2018, Pan Asia Logistics has been acquired by TVS Asianics, the logistics subsidiary of the TVS Group

== Gallery ==
Pan Asia Logistics Changi North Way warehouse located in Singapore

Pan Asia Logistics Tuas Bay Drive warehouse located in Singapore

Pan Asia Logistics Tanjung Pelepas warehouse located in Malaysia

Pan Asia Logistics Mercedes-Benz PDC located in Anseong, Korea
