= Ambujam Krishna =

Composer of Carnatic Kritis

Ambujam Krishna - Composer

Ambujam Krishna (1917–1989) was a composer of Carnatic Kritis. She has composed more than 600 kritis in various Carnatic ragas.

== Personal life ==
Ambujam Krishna is the daughter of K. V. Ranga Iyengar, an advocate of Madurai. She had her music training under Karaikudi Ganesan and Ganesha Bhagavathar. She married T. S. Krishna who was an industrialist and son of T. V. Sundaram Iyengar. She graduated in Home Science from the Delhi University. Industrialist Suresh Krishna is her son.

== Musical journey ==
Ambujam Krishna has written kritis in various languages such as Sanskrit, Kannada, Tamil and Telugu. She has also written songs with more than one language in the same song. It is called Manipravalam in Tamil. Her works have been published in two volumes under the title Geetamala.
Her lyrics have been set to music by various masters such as Sri Semmangudi Srinivasa Iyer, V. V. Sadagopan, S. Ramanathan, T. N. Seshagopalan, and others. She was a senior office bearer of Sri Sathguru Sangeetha Samajam, Madurai. She started a music college Satguru Sangeetha Vidyalayam as a wing of the sabha.
