= Ambaturai =

- village
- Location in Tamil Nadu, India Ambaturai (India)
- Coordinates: 10°15′37″N 77°55′49″E
- Country: India
- State: Tamil Nadu
- District: Dindigul

Languages
  - Official: Tamil
- Time zone: UTC+5:30 (IST)
- PIN: 624309
- Telephone code: 451
- Vehicle registration: TN-57
- Nearest city: Chinnalapatti
- Lok Sabha constituency: Dindigul

Ambaturai is a village that falls between road connecting Dindigul and Kodaikanal cities, Tamil Nadu, India. The railway station by the same name at this place serves as the alighting place for the town of Chinnalapatti and the Gandhigram Rural Institute.
