= Venu Srinivasan =

Indian businessman

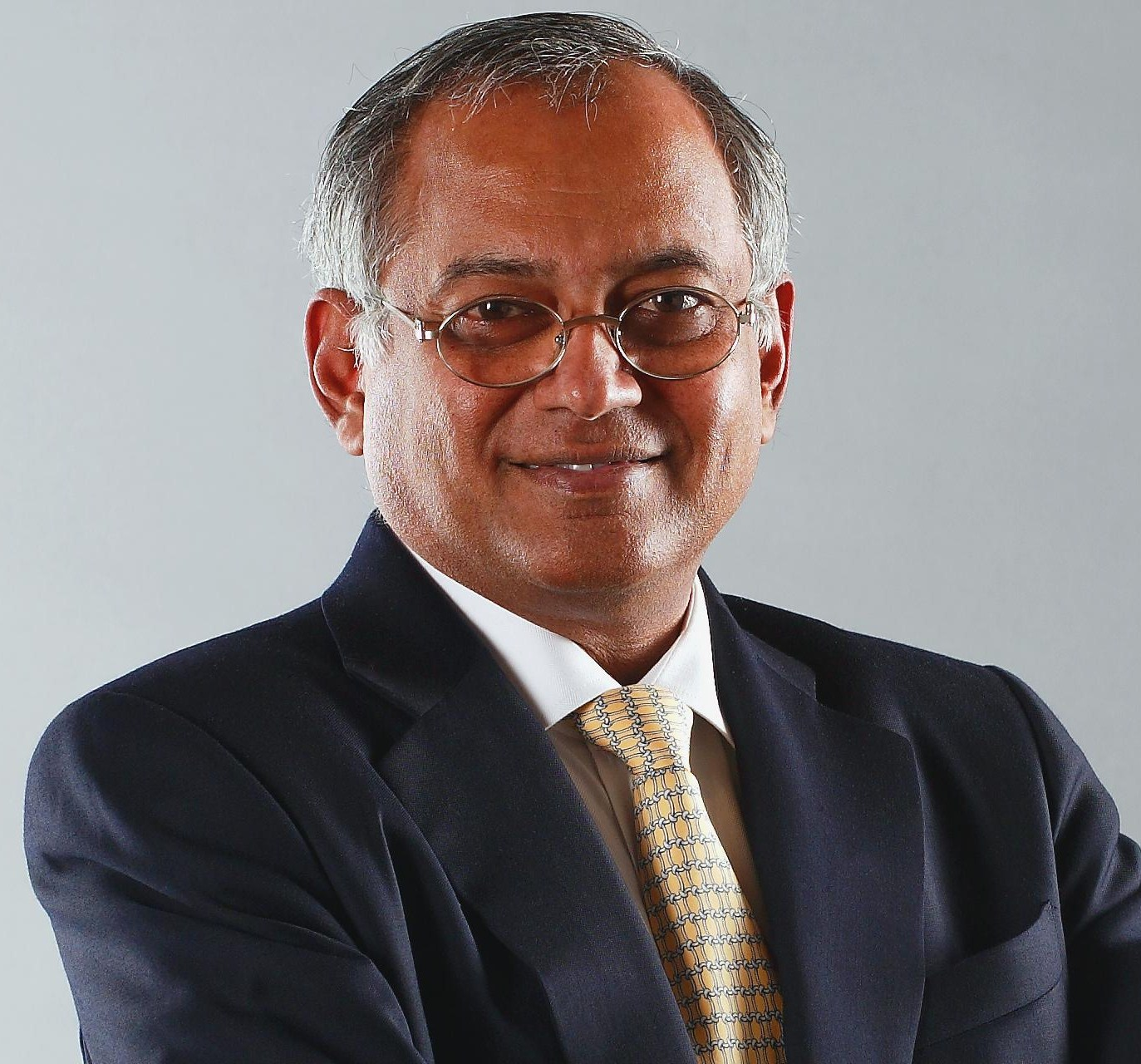
- Born: Chennai, Tamil Nadu, India
- Education: College of Engineering, Guindy; Purdue University
- Occupation: Industrialist
- Title: Chairman Emeritus of TVS Motor Company
- Board member of: T. V. Sundaram Iyengar & Sons
- Spouse: Mallika Srinivasan
- Children: Lakshmi Venu, Sudarshan Venu
- Relatives: TVS family T. S. Srinivasan (father); Prema Srinivasan (mother); Sheela Balaji (sister); T. V. Sundaram Iyengar (grandfather)

Venu Srinivasan (born 11 December 1952) is an Indian industrialist, he is the chairman emeritus of two-wheeler manufacturer TVS Motor Company and auto components manufacturer TVS Holdings. In addition, he serves on the board of Tata Sons and as one of the vice-chairmen of Tata Trusts. He received the Padma Bhushan, India's third-highest civilian award, in January 2020.

He started and oversees Srinivasan Services Trust (SST), a social outreach trust which works in more than 2,500 villages in India. Its focus areas are societal development through development of women and children, water conservation, improving livelihoods through agriculture & livestock and preservation & conservation of environment.

Venu was also the chairman, Board of Trustees, of the Srirangam Ranganathaswamy Temple and has supported restoration work at the complex and several other ancient temples in India. He was also appointed as a non-official director on the Central Board of Reserve Bank of India in 2022.

== Career ==
Venu Srinivasan is the grandson of the TVS Group's founder, T. V. Sundaram Iyengar. He did his schooling at Don Bosco Matriculation Higher Secondary School, Chennai. After graduating from the College of Engineering, Guindy, he completed a Master of Science degree in management from Purdue University in Indiana (United States).

He has received a Doctor of Management by Purdue University and a Doctor of Science by University of Warwick in Coventry, UK and the Indian Institute of Technology (IIT) Kharagpur, India.

He became the managing director of Sundaram-Clayton in May 1979. He went on to become the chairman of TVS Motor Company. In the late 1980s, Venu scripted a turnaround for the two-wheeler maker, which was mired in labour troubles with striking workers, leading to mounting losses. Venu shut the factory down for three months, forcing the unions to relent. He then upgraded plant machinery, invested in new technologies and implemented Total Quality Management (TQM), a Japanese method of process-driven manufacturing.

He also brought in Professor Lord Kumar Bhattacharyya of the University of Warwick as a consultant to provide guidance. In 2001, ending years of partnership with Suzuki, TVS Motor Company split from the Japanese automaker and started manufacturing on its own.

TVS Motor Company re-entered the market by launching TVS Victor – India's first indigenously built four-stroke motorcycle. The launches that followed, set TVS Motor on the path to becoming India's third-largest two-wheeler manufacturer.

Under Venu's leadership as the managing director, Sundaram-Clayton's brakes division won the Deming Prize in 1998 for having "achieved distinctive performance improvements through application of company-wide quality control". In 2002, TVS Motor Company also won the Deming Prize, becoming the first two-wheeler company in the world to do so. In 2019, Venu himself received the Deming Distinguished Service Award, granted to individuals who have made outstanding contributions in the dissemination and promotion of Total Quality Management.

== Awards and honours ==
Venu Srinivasan was elected as President of Confederation of Indian Industry (CII) year 2009–10. Venu was conferred the coveted Padma Shri Award by the President of India in 2010 for his contributions in the field of trade and industry. He is the "Goodwill Envoy for Culture and Diplomacy of the Republic of Korea". He was earlier the Honorary Consul General, Republic of Korea (in Chennai). In 2010, he was honoured by South Korean President Lee Myung-bak, with the civilian honour, Order of Diplomatic Service Merit, in recognition of his contribution to promoting bilateral relations between South Korea and India.

Asian Network for Quality (ANQ) chose Venu as one of the winners for its Ishikawa-Kano Award for the year 2012, for his contribution to the theory and practice of quality management within TVS Motor Company.

Venu was appointed the Honorary Commander of Korean Naval vessel, ROKS Choi Young (DDH-981) for his dedication to enhance the friendship and co-operation between the Republic of Korea and the Republic of India. In December 2014, Venu was conferred an honorary citizenship by the mayor of Busan Metropolitan City, the 2nd largest city in Korea.

As per Forbes list of India’s 100 richest tycoons, dated OCTOBER 09, 2024, Venu Srinivasan is ranked 55th with a net worth of $5.65 Billion.

| Year | Name | Awarding organization | Ref. |
|---|---|---|---|
| 2003 | Star of Asia | Businessweek | |
| 2004 | Doctor of Science | University of Warwick | |
| 2004 | Jamsetji Tata Lifetime Achievement Award | Indian Society for Quality | |
| 2005 | J R D Tata Corporate Leadership Award | All India Management Association | |
| 2009 | Doctor of Science | IIT, Kharagpur, India | |
| 2010 | Padma Shri | Government of India | |
| 2010 | Order of Diplomatic Service Merit | Government of South Korea | |
| 2012 | Ishikawa-Kano Award | Asian Network for Quality | |
| 2014 | Doctor of Management | Purdue University, USA | |
| 2014 | Honorary Commander of Korean Naval vessel, ROKS Choi Young | Republic of Korean Navy | |
| 2014 | Honorary Citizen of Busan City, Republic of Korea | Busan Metropolitan Council | |
| 2015 | Goodwill Envoy for Public Diplomacy | Republic of Korea | |
| 2016 | Champion of Champions and Best CEO | Business Today | |
| 2018 | Life Time Achievement Award | F A D A | |
| 2019 | Deming Distinguished Service Award | JUSE | |
| 2020 | Padma Bhushan | Government of India | |
| 2021 | Man of the Year | Autocar Professional | |
| 2023 | Outstanding Institution Builder Award | Union Minister of Civil Aviation | |
| 2023 | Lifetime Achievement Award | EY Entrepreneur of the Year Award (India) | |

== Criticism ==
Venu Srinivasan has also been criticised on multiple counts when he was the Chairman of Board of Trustees of the Sri Ranganathaswamy temple, Srirangam as head of Thiruppani committee of the Kabaleeswararar Temple, Chennai and a court case is ongoing with regards to unauthorised and illegal demolition of a Siva temple in Thirukurungudi Temple.

Widely publicised complaints by Rangarajan Narasimhan, there are multiple FIRs and court cases against Venu Srinivasan:

- Illegally being head of trustees, despite not being a hereditary trustee
- Illegally conducting underground research and not involving the ASI
- Illegal demolition of various statues inside the Srirangam Temple
- Venu Srinivasan was the head of the Thiruppani Committee for the Kabaleeswara Swamy temple, Chennai when the peacock Parvathi idol was stolen. He is on anticipatory bail in the ongoing court investigation

TVS Motor Company under his leadership has been criticized for scams in management, service centers, after sales and dealerships.
