= TVS SCS Rico =

British IT logistics and support provider

- Formerly: Ricochet Couriers (until 2004); Rico Logistics (2004–2017)
- Type: Subsidiary
- Industry: Logistics
- Founded: 4 November 1993; 32 years ago
- Founders: Sanj Sharma; Jagjit Grewal; Manohar Grewal
- Headquarters: Slough, England, United Kingdom
- Parent: TVS Supply Chain Solutions (from 2012)
- Website: www.tvsscs.com/courierservices

TVS SCS Rico, formerly Rico Logistics, is a British IT logistics and support services provider. Since 2012, it has been a subsidiary of Indian third party logistics provider TVS Supply Chain Solutions (TVS SCS), a TVS Group company.

== History ==
The business started on 4 November 1993 under the name Ricochet Couriers, providing same-day courier services in and around Slough. The business was founded by Sanj "Sam" Sharma and brothers Jagjit "Jag" and Manohar Grewal with £500 working capital and a single customer, WH Smith. It quickly expanded to four offices within the West London area and then commenced servicing contracts in the IT sector.

Initially, emergency calls were generally serviced from one major warehouse making it difficult to reach all of the UK within four hours. Starting in 1994, Rico began expanding with additional warehouses across the UK to support two to four hour service to all major cities. The majority of deliveries were parts for engineers servicing the retail, banking, and server sectors and Rico stored spare components in its warehouses on behalf of its clients to increase delivery speed. As it established this business model it began referring to its warehouses as fixed stock locations (FSL's).

As part of a strategic move to expand its services, Ricochet acquired Burnham Logistics in 2002. Burnham gave Ricochet the ability to offer on-site tech exchange services where Ricochet technicians would handle transport, exchange, and return. The Burnham acquisition gave Ricochet 200 peripheral technicians to carry out these services. As a complement to this offering, Ricochet added pick up and drop off (PUDO) locations to its network which meant its clients' engineers could have parts shipped to a nearby location where they could pick and return parts.

In 2004, Ricochet changed its name to Rico Logistics as the company expanded its services and began servicing clients outside the UK.

Rico acquired Dublin-based field service logistics and IT repair provider Tri-tec Logistics in 2008. Tri-tec had been Rico's Irish supplier prior to the acquisition and continued to operate as Tri-tec until 2010 when it was merged into Rico.

=== Acquisition by TVS ===
On 28 September 2012 Indian third party logistics provider TVS Logistics Services Ltd. (TVS LSL), a TVS Group company, acquired a majority stake in Rico for ₹100 crore (£11.81 million) partly financed by KKR. Sharma, Rico's managing director, retained his stake and role in the company with TVS LSL acquiring the ownership stakes of his two partners giving them a total of 85% of the company. Rico's 450 existing employees were expected to be retained. Post-acquisition, Rico was grouped with TVS LSL's existing UK operations, TVS Supply Chain Solutions (TVS SCS), headquartered in Chorley, Lancashire bringing TVS SCS's workforce to 2,000 employees.

TVS SCS had been formed by merging TVS LSL's prior UK acquisitions: commercial automotive parts wholesaler and distributor CJ Components, acquired in 2004, and light commercial vehicle parts manufacturer Multipart Holdings, acquired in 2009. TVS LSL's acquisition of Rico was intended to complement its existing businesses including its Indian operations, TVS SCS in the UK, and Mesco in the US, acquired in 2011.

=== Post-Acquisition ===
On 1 November 2013, Rico acquired the domestic UK operations DHL Same Day, DHL Express' same day courier service. DHL Express UK continued to operate day and time definite as well as international services in the UK. DHL Same Day offered same-day courier and FSL services mostly to IT customers which complemented Rico's existing business. The transition of DHL Same Day's operations into Rico's was completed on 28 February 2014.

Rico acquired a majority stake in British air cargo and same-day delivery company Circle Express on 18 January 2016. Circle was one of the largest independent couriers offering UK airfreight forwarding services operating 300 vehicles from 8 depots near UK airports and one cross dock facility. At the time, Rico was operating 1,400 vehicles from 48 depots. The addition of Circle was especially significant for Rico's hazardous material handling capabilities since Circle was the only UK operator licensed for transportation of all classes of hazardous material and operated its own hazardous materials handling training facility.

In its first major expansion outside of Europe, Rico began offering services in India and Australia in 2016. The same year, it began offering break fix and desk side technical support services.

In 2017, Rico rebranded itself to TVS SCS Rico. Later that year, it acquired a majority stake in British hardware support provider SPC International from Beringea. SPC had operations in the UK, Europe, the US, and India.

== Operations ==
Rico splits its operations into three divisions:

- Same Day Courier: Operating in the UK as a same day courier and in the rest of Europe with contract services.
- Technology Logistics Services: Provides IT support and management services in the UK and Europe.
- Spare Parts Logistics: Provides supply chain support and spare parts transportation and storage for IT vendors and support providers in Europe and India.
