= Swami Dayananda =

Swami Dayananda may refer to:

- Dayanand Saraswati (Swami Dayanand Saraswati, 1824–1883), founder of the Arya Samaj
- Dayananda Saraswati (Arsha Vidya) (Pujya Swami Dayananda Saraswati, 1930–2015), founder of Arsha Vidya Gurukulam
- Bede Griffiths (1906-1993), also known as Swami Dayananda, English Roman Catholic monk who lived in India
