= TVS Electronics =

Indian multinational electronics company

TVS Electronics Limited
- Company Logo
- Trade name: tvselect
- Type: Public
- Traded as: BSE: 532513; NSE: TVSELECT
- ISIN: INE236G01019
- Industry: Conglomerate
- Founded: 1986; 40 years ago
- Headquarters: Chennai, Tamil Nadu, India
- Area served: Worldwide
- Key people: Gopal Srinivasan (Chairman); Srilalitha Gopal (MD)
- Products: Computer peripherals; Printers; Keyboard; UPS; IT Services
- Revenue: ▲US$470 million (FY 2017)
- Number of employees: 2,000+ (2024)
- Parent: TVS Group
- Website: www.tvselectronics.in

TVS Electronics is an Indian multinational electronics company, headquartered in Chennai. TVS Electronics designs, manufactures and distributes IT products, dot matrix printers, point of sale terminals, Thermal and label printers, keyboards, mobiles, mouse, uninterruptible power supplies, and set top boxes. TVS Electronics also provides design, manufacturing and service support on a contractual basis for telephone and IT Companies.

== See also ==
- TVS Group
- TVS Motor Company
- Electronics industry
