= Ambathurai =

- Village
- Location in Tamil Nadu, India
- Coordinates: 10.2725047°N 77.9244456°E
- Country: India
- State: Tamil Nadu
- District: Dindigul

Population (2011)
  - Total: 9,166

Languages
  - Official: Tamil
- Time zone: UTC+5:30 (IST)
- PIN: 624302
- Telephone code: 0451
- Website: www.chinnalapatti.com

Ambathurai is a village in Dindigul district in the state of Tamil Nadu, India. The latitude 10.2725047 and longitude 77.9244456 are the geo-coordinates of Ambathurai. Chennai is the state capital for Ambathurai village. It is located around 406.1 kilometer away from Ambathurai. The other nearest state capital from Ambathurai is Thiruvananthapuram and its distance is 214.2 km. The other surrounding state capitals are Pondichery (278.6 km). and Bangalore (303.3 km).

== Demographics ==
As of the 2011 Census of India, Ambathurai had a population of 9,166. Males constitute 49.74% of the population and females 50.25%. Ambathurai has an average literacy rate of 66.75%, higher than the national average. The village is primarily focused on agriculture. Recently non-farming job opportunities and businesses have been started by the population.

== Economy ==
Ambathurai's economy depends on a mixed set of occupations like farming, daily wagers, government service staff and non-farming businesses.

== Railway Station ==
There is a railway station in Ambathurai village. It is becoming a busy railway station due to its proximity to the town Chinnalapatti. There are 3-4 Broad Gauge railway tracks in the station and it supports Electric Trains too. Few important Express trains and local passenger trains are stopping in the station. Notable ones is the Pandian Super fast Express that runs between Chennai and Madurai.

Nearest Railway station is in Dindigul which is just located 10 km away.

== Transportation ==
Ambathurai is situated on the National Highway 7 (NH7) which connects Madurai with Dindigul. It has a bus facility and train services. Town buses are operated by both the government and private sectors. Madurai Airport is the nearest airport for this village (approximately 65 km).

== Education ==
=== Schools Nearby ===
1. St. Josephs Primary School - 1.5 km.
2. Rc Sagayarani Middle School - 0.8 km.
3. Thambithottam Higher Secondary School - 1.5 km.
4. Victory Matriculation School - 2.7 km.
5. Devangar Boys Higher Secondary School - 2 km
6. Devangar Girls Higher Secondary School - 3.3 km
7. Cheran Vidhyalaya Matric Higher Secondary School - 5 km.

=== Universities Nearby ===
- Gandhigram Rural Institute
