= T. S. Soundaram =

Indian politician, social reformer and physician

Dr T. S. Soundaram
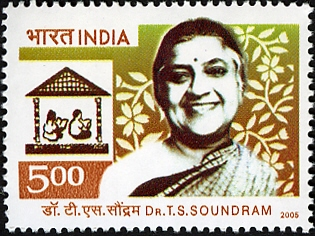

Member of Parliament, Lok Sabha
- In office 1962–1967
- Preceded by: M. Gulam Mohideen
- Succeeded by: N. Anbuchezhian
- Constituency: Dindigul

Member of the Madras State Assembly
- In office 1957–1962
- Preceded by: V. Madanagopal
- Succeeded by: S. Nanjunda Rao
- Constituency: Vedasandur
- In office 1952–1957
- Preceded by: Office established
- Succeeded by: M. A. B. Arumugasamy
- Constituency: Athoor

Personal details
- Born: 18 August 1904 Thirunelveli, Madras Presidency, British India
- Died: 21 October 1984 (aged 80) Dindigul, Tamil Nadu, India
- Party: Indian National Congress
- Spouse(s): Soundararajan (m. 1918, died) G. Ramachandran (m. 1940)
- Parent: T. V. Sundaram Iyengar (father)
- Relatives: TVS family
- Education: Lady Hardinge Medical College, New Delhi (MBBS); Madras University
- Occupation: Doctor, Politician, Social Worker

Thirukkurungudi S. Soundaram Ramachandran (18 August 1904 – 21 October 1984) was an Indian physician, social reformer and politician was the daughter of T. V. Sundaram Iyengar, the founder of T V Sundaram Iyengar and Sons Limited, popularly known as TVS Group of companies, one of India's largest industrial conglomerates. She was married young barely at the age of 14 in 1918, her husband Soundararajan, encouraged her to study. But when he died when she was in her teens, it was her parents who urged her to continue with her studies. It was at Lady Hardinge Medical College in Delhi that she did her medicine degree.

== Freedom struggle and remarriage ==
During her college days in Delhi, she became friends with Sushila Nayyar and through her she met Gandhi. She was immediately drawn to the freedom struggle, but she did not give up her studies. She was 32 years old in 1936 when she was graduated as a doctor. She then involved herself wholeheartedly into the freedom struggle and through Gandhi met G. Ramachandran, a Keralite, who was active in the Harijan movement. They fell in love and decided to get married, but her parents were vehemently opposed to the alliance. Gandhi advised them not to keep in touch with each other for a year. After that separation, when they still felt the same way about each other, Gandhi gave them his blessings and they got married on 7 November 1940. T. S. Soundaram and her husband were soon in the thick of the Quit India Movement, but as freedom neared Gandhi thought she would serve India better by not getting involved in politics. He made her the representative in South India of the Kasturba Gandhi National Memorial Trust and entrusted her with setting up an institution in a rural area that would improve the lot of the poorest of the poor. So was born the idea of Gandhigram, where villagers were taught skills and provided support to revive village industries and the economy of the rural community. T. S. Soundaram threw herself wholeheartedly into this project that focused on healthcare, education, economic development and social welfare in the rural communities in the surrounding area.

== Social work ==
In 1947, Soundaram started the Kasturba Hospital as a two-bed clinic in a house in Chinnalapatti, a small town on the Madurai Dindigul highway. Under the visionary leadership of Dr Soundaram, the hospital made several inroads into rural health and family welfare which is now a 220-bed hospital. Along with her husband, G. Ramachandran, she notably founded the Gandhigram Rural Institute in 1947 as a memorial to Kasturba Gandhi, the deceased wife of Mahatma Gandhi, with a fund of national donations. This was set up as a rural institution, in a remote place in Dindigul district, Tamil Nadu to serve the most deprived of people.

The Gandhigram Rural Institute became a deemed university in 1976.

== Political life ==
Soundaram was elected Member of the Legislative Assembly twice from then Madras State, first in 1952 from Athoor Assembly constituency and in 1957 from Vedasandur Assembly constituency representing Indian National Congress, then an MP in 1962 representing Dindigul Lok Sabha constituency. With her move again to Delhi, she was appointed the Union Deputy Minister for Education. It was during her tenure as Deputy Minister that she introduced free primary education throughout India. She also helped start the National Service Scheme (NSS), that still has a strong rural service element to it. In the year 1962 she was awarded Padma Bhushan for her contribution towards social work. Soundaram lost the 1967 general election from Dindigul Lok Sabha constituency to N. Anbuchezhian a young student leader of DMK with a margin of more than one lakh votes, subsequently she went back to social work and retired from politics.

== Commemoration ==
- A commemorative stamp was issued on 2 October 2005.
