= AIM For Seva =

Non-profit organisation in India and elsewhere

AIM (All India Movement) For Seva is a service organization in India, founded by Swami Dayananda Saraswati in 2000 to make education and healthcare accessible to children in rural areas of India. It is a non-governmental organization (NGO) in special consultative status with the United Nations Economic and Social Council. AIM for Seva is funded entirely by donations.

The organization's overseas operations are in the United States, Canada and Australia. The group's aim is to close the cultural, social and economic divide between urban and rural areas in India.

== Etymology ==
Seva is a concept in Indian religions that translate to selfless service.

== Project initiatives ==
Sheela Balaji is the managing trustee and chair of AIM For Seva, which is a Pan-India charitable trust which is tasked with opening and sustaining free student hostels in remote and rural parts of India to help children from those regions to continue schooling. The organisation runs a large school in Manjakkudi in Tamil Nadu, but it also has 100 hostels across India. Balaji was awarded the Nari Shakti Puraskar for her work (including preserving and growing rare rice varieties). The trust had helped over 30,000 children in 16 states in India, with over 105 free student homes with an average of 30 students in each home and the setting up of each hostel takes $1,00,000 and the annual cost of each student works out approx $450.

=== Free Student Homes (Chatralayas) ===
The movement is an integrated community development program designed to reach out to rural and tribal children across India. The core initiative of AIM for Seva are free student homes or Chatralayas. It is a means to create an educational environment for disadvantaged children, who are provided 360 degree support (24*7*365) to continue their education through its facilities, which are referred to as Free Student Hostels (FSH). Children are offered educational opportunities apart from a clean environment to stay, food, education and extracurricular activities. Education regarding healthy living and ‘eco-learning’ or understanding how to be environmentally aware are also aspects of the experience. Many student homes are located near other academic institutions to ensure that students can access to continuing studies. One of the goals of the organization is to build a student home in every rural district in India or roughly 600 student homes. Since 2001, more than 100 homes have been built. The free student hostels provides accommodation for children from 4th class to 12th class which is most crucial time of growth and learning for a student and the hostels provide children with good study facilities, meals, and knowledge of health and hygiene for children's holistic growth.

=== Healthcare ===
It has also expanded its scope of aid through the opening of free health centres.

=== Other ===
Other initiatives include Art for Development, renewable energy, theatre for development and distance learning. On December 13, 2020, AIM for Seva organised virtual performances ‘Shiva Shakti’ (a dance-theatre by Odissi exponent Sharmila Biswas) and ‘Psychology & Contemporary Management’ (a talk by its founder Swami Dayananda Saraswati), proceeds of the event were donated towards annadanam for 250 students who stay across chatralayas due to COVID-19. Many of these children come from remote villages and tribal settlements and AIM for seva is supporting by giving the children three nutritious meals daily. On the evening of October 6, 2018, a mesmerizing dance drama titled “Nandalala” by Bharathanjali marked the annual donor appreciation event of the Bay Area chapter of the All India Movement for Seva at the Smithwick Theater at Foothill College, California. There are around 30 chapters of the non-profit in the United States and the Bay Area chapter of the non-profit is responsible for sustaining seven hostels for approximately $100,000. There was also a planned contribution towards the construction of the Swami Dayananda Residential School and Free Student Hostel complex in a village in Madhya Pradesh in also including facilities for rural ambulance service and health sanitation program for the local community.

== Impact ==
A list of Indian states with Free Student Homes & the number of students in 2015 was: Andhra Pradesh (368), Gujarat (346), Haryana (41), Himachal Pradesh (35), Karnataka (763), Kerala (88), Madhya Pradesh (439), Maharashtra (287), Orissa (20), Puducherry (unknown), Rajasthan (25), Tamil Nadu (686), Telangana (175) and Uttar Pradesh (69). AIM supports over 4000 children across 104 chatralayas in 16 states.
