= G. Ramachandran (social reformer) =

Indian social reformer

- Born: October 7, 1904
- Died: January 17, 1995 (aged 90)
- Occupations: social reformer, teacher
- Spouse: T. S. Soundram

G. Ramachandhran (7 October 1904 – 17 January 1995) was a Gandhian, social reformer, author and teacher. With his wife, Dr. T. S. Soundram he started the Gandhigram, Tamil Nadu in 1945. Viswabharati, Rabindranath Tagore's University, in Santhiniketan awarded him the higher title "Desikottama" ('The Best teacher'). He was an MP and Health and Education Minister in Pattom Thanu Pillai's Ministry in Kerala.

Ramachandran met Gandhi at Dilkush during his 1921 21 day fast and had a number of conversations with the Mahatma. He was then a student of CF Andrews at Santiniketan. Ramachandran soon became an inmate of Gandhi's ashram at Sevagram and under Gandhi's direct guidance and supervision became involved in the national movement and the Gandhian Constructive Programme. During the Freedom struggle, he was arrested eleven times and spent seven years in jail.

Ramachandran was sent to Jamia Millia Islamia at the request of Dr Zakhir Hussain where he served as a lecturer and taught spinning. Khadi work brought him closer to the common man and he began selling Khadi yarn and cotton, later becoming the Chairman of All India Khadi and Village Industries Commission (KVIC). During his tenure as chairman, he started the People's Education Programme for poor.

Ramachandran become Founder Vice Chancellor of Gandhigram Rural University along with his wife, Dr Soundram Ramachandran. They also founded the Institute of Rural health and Family planning Centre‚ Institute for 'Sanitary Inspectors' Training, and Kasturba Hospital.

After serving various cadres before and after the Independence of India he returned to his native hometown Neyyattinkara, Kerala, and started The Madhavimandiram Loka Seva Trust for the Welfare of Women and Children in 1980. In 1991 he started Dr GR Public school at Neyyatinkara. It is affiliated to C.B.S.E.

He was known for his public speaking and writing. His autobiography, ''Adventuring with Life'', reflects his experiences and discusses the political and social conditions of his time.

== Biography/milestones ==
The milestones in the eventful life of this multifaceted personality and man of conviction and humor are numerous. He joined the Non Cooperation movement in 1920 & participated in the Tilak Swaraj Fund. Around the same time or a year later, he met "the dear, revered Kumarji at the Travancore District Congress Conference in Chertalai" and began promoting Khadi living with him in Trivandrum. This lasted for several years. Ramachandran became one of the earliest Honors Graduates of the Visva Bharati in 1924 and joined the Sabarmathi Ashram. After college he took part in the Salt-Satyagraha Revolution in 1930 together with Rajaji at Vedaranyam. He was sentenced to imprisonment for one year and a fine of 500 rupees. He also functioned as the Provincial Secretary of the Harijan Sevak Sangh in Tamil Nadu and Kerala and member of the Central Executive Committee of Harijan Sevak Sangh. Ramachandran took active part in the Temple Entry movement in Tamilnad and Kerala (Vaikom). As decided by Harijan Sevak Sangh, he toured around Travncore with M. Govindan, K.G. Kunjukrishna Pillai, V. Achutha Menon and others collecting signatures of "Savarna Hindus" in favour of the entry of "Avarnars" to temples which complemented the exceptional work carried out by the Valiya Rajah of Ennakkadu, K. Kumar and Pandavath Sankara Pillai in Travancore in favour of temple entry and communal harmony[**]. He later spent six years as one of the general Secretaries of the Hindustani Tamil Sangh in Sevagram and actively promoted Basic Education in Tamil Nadu, Mysore and Andra. He was later appointed the Chairman of the Basic Education Assessment Committee set up by the Government of India. He was even appointed educational advisor of Rajaji Government of Madras State and joined the Pattom Tanu Pillai Cabinet (in Travancore) as a Minister. He served the Indian Express as an Editor. Along with his wife Dr (Mrs.) Soundram Ramachandran founded Gandhigram in 1947 and was its Director for 15 years. He also served as a member of the Rajya Sabha for 6 years. He served on the Bal with Ray G Mehta Committee on Community Development. He was the general secretary of Gandhi Smark Nidhi for 3 years. He was even the Founder Secretary of the Gandhi Peace Foundation, and editor of Gandhi Marg (English Journal). He conferred the degree of D.Litt. by the Kashi Vidya Peeth, title of "Desikottama" by Viswabarathi University and Doctorate by Gandhigram Rural University. He traveled the world and lectured in the universities in England, Germany, United States, Soviet Union, Poland, Yugoslavia, Ceylon etc. spreading the message of Mahatma Gandhi. He was a member of the delegation sent to Moscow by the Gandhi Peace foundation along with the Congress President UN Debar to take the message of peace and to prevent the use of Nuclear weapons. He was an author and wrote Thought and Talks, Village Reconstruction Step by Step, The Man Gandhi, A Sheaf of Gandhi Anecdotes, Higher Values of Life, Adventuring with Life and more titles. He was an advocate of world peace and received peace awards from Grambling University, US, and the Soka Gakkai International, Tokyo. As a last venture Ramachandran founded the Madhavimandiram Loka Seva Trust, at the age of 76, bequeathing all his ancestral property (to the Trust) in memory of his mother Smt Madhavi Tankachi.

G Ramachandran's niece Saraswati Thankachi married, Dr. Kanthilal Gandhi – Mahatma Gandhi's grandson.
