= Gandhigram, Tamil Nadu =

Gandhigram
- Town
- Location in Tamil Nadu, India Gandhigram (India)
- Coordinates: 10.279345°N 77.934544°E
- Country: India
- State: Tamil Nadu
- District: Dindigul
- Region: Madurai

Population (2001)
  - Total: 10,666

Languages
  - Official: Tamil
- Time zone: UTC+5:30 (IST)
- PIN: 624302
- Telephone code: 0451

Gandhigram is a census town in Dindigul district along the National Highway 44 in the state of Tamil Nadu, India. Gandhigram is situated between Dindigul & Madurai on the NH 47(old) and current NH 44. Its next to Chinnalapatti.

== Demographics ==
As of 2001 India census, Gandhigram had a population of 10,666. Males constitute 53% of the population and females 47%. Gandhigram has an average literacy rate of 74%, higher than the national average of 59.5%: male literacy is 79%, and female literacy is 69%. In Gandhigram, 11% of the population is under 6 years of age.

== Gandhigram Rural Institute ==
Gandhigram Rural Institute is 100% funded by the Government of India through University Grants Commission, New Delhi. It is not managed by the Gandhigram Trust. This university is a deemed university and delivers diploma, undergraduate, post-graduate programs, M.Phil. and Ph.D. in various disciplines of Science, Social Science, Agriculture, Public health, Rural Industries.

Thambithottam Higher Secondary School is the secondary school under Gandhigram Institute.

== Kasthuriba Hospital ==
Gandhigram Trust also operates a hospital in the name of Mahatma Gandhi's wife Kasthuribai. This hospital is one of the largest hospital in the district. But unlike other private hospital, this hospital is service centric. Here many poor people from surrounding villages get quality care and treatment with well established infra-structure. At present Dr. Kousalya Devi is governing the hospital. She is well known for her service as Mother Teresa of Tamil Nadu. In this hospital they manufacture jaipur foot.
