= TVS One Make Championship =

- Category: Motorcycle racing
- Country: India
- Inaugural season: 1992
- Makes' champion: TVS Motor Company
- Official website: https://www.tvsmotor.com/tvsracing/tvs-india-one-make-championship-omc

TVS One Make Championship is an annual motorcycling event conducted by TVS Motor Company. The championship is conducted in five rounds organized at Madras Motor Race Track, Kari Motor Speedway and Buddh International Circuit. The One Make Championship is approved by the Federation of Motor Sports Clubs of India (FMSCI).

== Categories ==
The championship consists of two categories – Open and Novice. Both these categories include two races on racing tuned 4-stroke TVS Apache RTR 200 4V bikes. For the Novice category, there are two criteria; 1. The riders should be of below the age of 23 years on the date of race 2. They should not have won any of the previous championships or races conducted anywhere in the world. For the Open category, the age of the riders should be above 23 years and they must hold a winning title in any professional race or championship. Each rider is also required to possess a valid competition license issued by FMSCI.

== Motorcycles ==
The bike used for the championship, the TVS Apache RTR 200 4V is very different to the street legal version. The lightweight half-faired bodywork, committed ergonomics and stripped down nature of the motorcycle gives it racing characteristics. The engine, suspension, brakes, wheels and frame have been used from the road legal bike, but they have been heavily tuned to get the maximum speed and acceleration of the motorcycle.

== See also ==
- TVS Asia One Make Championship
