= N. Anbuchezhian =

Indian politician

- Born: Neelamegam Anbuchezhian; 1 November 1936 (age 90); Sekkapatti(village), Madurai district, Tamil Nadu
- Occupations: Politician, Former Member of Lok Sabha, Former MLA

Neelamegam Anbuchezhian (B.Sc.,(Maths)., MA., (Political Science) is an Indian politician born and brought up from the state (Region) of Tamil Nadu in Sekkapatti village of Madurai District (Dindigul Area now). He was elected Member of Parliament for the Dindigul constituency for the period 1967–1971. Anbuchezhian subsequently served a term in the Legislative Assembly of Tamil Nadu.

== Early life ==
N. Anbuchezhian was born in Sekkapatti village in the Madurai district (now part of Dindigul district), on 1 November 1936. His father, A. Neelamegam was an agriculturist. He had his school life in his native village. He studied Intermediate Pre-University Course at Virudhunagar Hindu Nadar's Senthikumara Nadar College, Virudhunagar; and then he completed bachelor's degree Under Graduation in Mathematics at Sir Theagaraya College, Madras( Chennai). He studied Post Graduation Degree MA., Political Science in Pachaiappas College, Chennai.

== Politics ==
Anbuchezhian was a member of the Dravida Munnetra Kazhagam (DMK) and was selected to contest the 1967 election for the 4th Lok Sabha as handpicked candidate directly by C. N. Annadurai, the founder of DMK. He was the first MP for the constituency who was not a member of the Indian National Congress (INC) party. He defeated the sitting Congress MP and Union Minister, T. S. Soundram, with a margin of over 100,000 votes.

Subsequently, between 1971 and 1976, Anbuchezhian was also the Member of the Legislative Assembly for the Periyakulam state assembly constituency, after defeating Chinnasamy Chettai of the INC by a margin of 9,595 votes. During the same period, he was elected chairman of the Batlagundu in Dindigul District, defeating INC candidate Radhakrishna Chettiar. Anbuchezhian was also elected as Panchayat President in his own village of Sekkapatti.

Anbuchezhian contested Nilakkottai assembly constituency ( General ) during 1962 election in DMK ticket. He lost the election with a slender margin of 944 votes. The election result was declared void by High court. Subsequently, during the reconstitution of assembly constituencies in TN, Nillakottai assembly constituency was categorized as reserved one.
