= M. Aram =

Indian politician

Muthkumaraswamy Aram Valarthanatan
- Born: 14 January 1927
- Died: 24 May 1997 (aged 70)
- Title: Dr. M. Aram

Member of Parliament, Rajya Sabha
- In office 27 August 1993 – 1997
- Constituency: Nominated

M. Aram (1927–1997) was an educator and peace advocate from India.

== Positions held ==
Aram was the founder and president of Shanti Ashram (located in Coimbatore, Tamil Nadu, India), a community development organization that carries out projects in several areas, including education, health, and environmental restoration. He also served as the president of the World Conference on Religion and Peace International.

In 1993, the President of India appointed Aram to the Rajya Sabha, the upper house of the Parliament of India. He served on the Parliamentary Standing Committee on Rural Development and the Parliamentary Standing Committee on Human Resource, Environment and Technology.

== Peace Service ==
From 1964 to 1980, Aram participated in the Nagaland Peace Mission, and he helped design the Shillong Peace Accord of 1975. He was also involved in a number of other peace organizations, including the Asian Peace Council, the Delhi-Peking Peace March, the Gandhi Peace Foundation, the World Conference of Religions for Peace, and the Sarvodaya Peace Movement.

== Educational and other services ==
From 1954 to 1963, Aram was the principal of Ramakrishna Mission Vidyalaya in Coimbatore. From 1980 to 1986, he was the vice-chancellor of Gandhigram Rural University. He was involved in programs that expanded higher education in rural areas, and he was also a proponent of Shanti Sena, a peace education program. He served as a visiting professor at North Eastern Hill University, Dibrugarh University, Gandhigram Rural University, Madras University, and Madurai Kamaraj University.

== Awards ==
- In March 1990, the President of India awarded the Padma Shri, in the field of Literature and Education, to Aram.
- In 1995, Aram became the 12th recipient of the Niwano Peace Prize.
- The Sarvodaya Movement of India conferred the award of Defender of Peace to Aram.
- Dr. Ramachandran Award for International Peace and Understanding

To recognise Aram's peace mission work in Nagaland, North Eastern Hill University awarded him an honorary Doctor of Letters degree.

== Publications ==
- "The Future of Mankind"
- "Micro-Planning at the Village Level"
- "Towards 2000 A.D."-Special Lectures.
- "Peace in Nagaland."-Arnold Heinemann.
- "Gandhian Dialectic"-Special Lectures.
- "Gandhi on Education"-in Tamil.
- "Gandhian Perspective on Integrated Rural Development."
- "Apostle of Peace"-Lectures on Gandhi.
- "Kumara Ullam" (Adolescent Mind)-in Tamil.
- "Evolution on Naga Politics."
- "Some Aspects of Creative Thinking"-Research paper.
- "Standardised Achievement Tests"-Research Monograph.
- "Micro-Experiment in Population Education."
