= TVS Supply Chain Solutions =

Indian multinational company

- Formerly: TVS Logistics Services Limited
- Type: Public
- Traded as: NSE: TVSSCS; BSE: 543965
- ISIN: INE395N01027
- Industry: Logistics
- Founded: 1995; 31 years ago
- Headquarters: Chennai, Tamil Nadu, India
- Key people: Ramachandran Dinesh (MD); S. Ravichandran (Deputy MD)
- Services: Supply chain management
- Revenue: ▲₹10,235 crore (US$1.1 billion) (FY23)
- Operating income: ▲₹706 crore (US$75 million) (FY23)
- Net income: ▲₹42 crore (US$4.5 million) (FY23)
- Number of employees: 18,000
- Parent: TVS Group
- Website: tvsscs.com

TVS Supply Chain Solutions (TVS SCS) is an Indian multinational transportation, logistics and warehousing company. It provides supply chain management services to customers in the automotive, consumer goods, defence and utility sectors in India, the United Kingdom, Europe and the US. It is part of the TVS Group of companies.

== History ==
The company began in 1995 as TVS Logistics, a division of TVS & Sons, before being hived off as a separate company in 2004 as TVS Logistics Services Ltd. (TVS LSL). In 2004 it bought out the UK based CJ Components – an automotive component sourcing company. The company pursued further acquisitions across Europe, the UK, the US, Singapore and Australia.

In 2009, TVS LSL acquired Multipart Holding, which is among the top three after market logistics companies in UK. With the Multipart acquisition, TVS LSL formed a European subsidiary, TVS Supply Chain Solutions (TVS SCS) from JC and Multipart. This was followed in 2012 by the acquisition of same day courier and IT support and logistics firm Rico Logistics for ₹100 crore (£11.81 million). Rico operated as a subsidiary of TVS SCS and was renamed TVS SCS Rico in 2017.

TVS Logistics was then renamed to TVS Supply Chain Solutions in 2019.

In 2020, Mitsubishi Corporation invested in TVS Supply Chain Solutions for minority stake.

In August 2023, the company launched its initial public offering and got listed on the Indian stock exchanges.
