= Dayananda Saraswati (Arsha Vidya) =

Hindu monk and teacher (1930–2015)

Swami Dayananda Saraswati
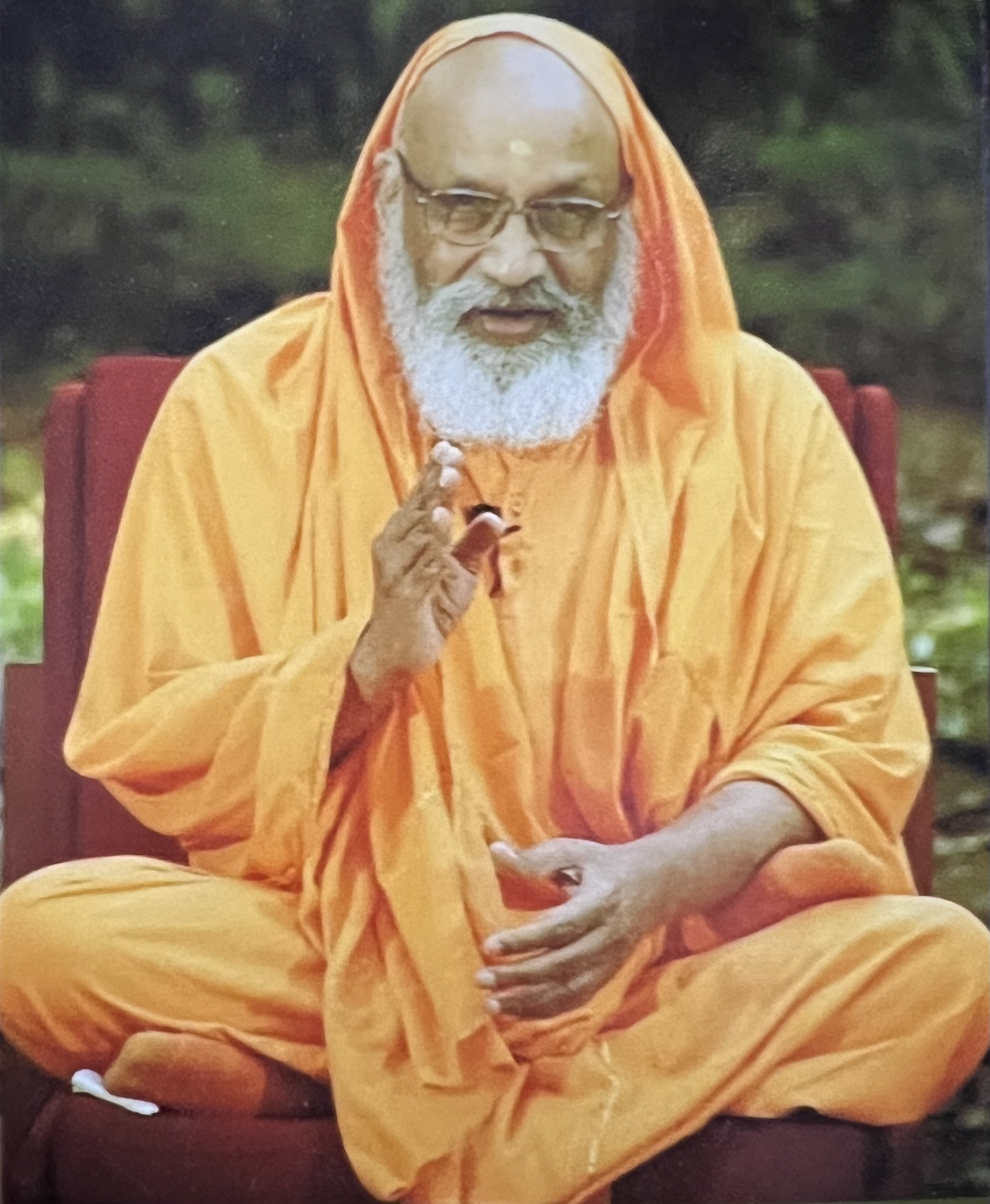
- His Holiness Swami Dayananda Saraswati, from the private collection of Arsha Vidya Gurukulam.

Personal life
- Born: Natarajan Gopala Iyer; 15 August 1930 Manjakkudi, Tamil Nadu, India
- Died: 23 September 2015 (aged 85) Rishikesh, Uttarakhand, India
- Website: Official website

Religious life
- Religion: Hinduism
- Founder of: Arsha Vidya Gurukulam; AIM For Seva; Swami Dayananda Educational Trust
- Philosophy: Advaita Vedanta

Religious career
- Teacher: Chinmayananda Saraswati Swami Pranavananda

Swami Dayananda Saraswati (15 August 1930 – 23 September 2015) was a renunciate monk of the Hindu Saraswati order of sannyasa. He was also known as Pujya Swamiji and was a traditional teacher of Advaita Vedanta. He was the founder of the Arsha Vidya Gurukulams in Pennsylvania, USA; Rishikesh, Uttarakhand and Coimbatore Tamil Nadu, India. He was also the spiritual Guru of Prime Minister Narendra Modi. He was awarded the Padma Bhushan, (the third-highest civilian award in the Republic of India), for his service to the nation in the field of spirituality in 2016.

== Biography ==
=== Early life ===
Swami Dayananda Saraswati was born as Natarajan in Manjakkudi in the Thiruvarur district of Tamil Nadu on 15 August 1930 to Shri Gopala Iyer and Smt Valambal, of a Brahmin family. He was the eldest of four sons. His early schooling was at the District Board School in Kodavasal. His father died when he was eight years old, which meant Natarajan had to shoulder the responsibility in the family alongside his education.

After the completion of his education at seventeen years of age, Natarajan came to Chennai to earn a livelihood. There he learnt English and began his career as a journalist for the weekly magazine Dharmika Hindu, run by T. K. Jagannathacharya (TKJ). However, owing to nominal income and at the behest of a friend, Rangachari, Natarajan enrolled in the Airforce as a combatant in Bangalore with the GTS (Ground Training Station). He was underweight and could not qualify but was allowed to continue. He later stated that he aspired to be a pilot. Family duties, namely his father's shraddham (a ceremony performed in honour of a dead ancestor), caused him to leave the Airforce. Above all, he did not like the rigidity. "There was no freedom, I felt they were trying to control my mind. I have never allowed anybody to ever control me at any time, no one. That is why I think I am a Swami."

Natarajan resumed his career as a journalist with 'Dharmika Hindu' magazine before joining a news agency, 'The Lens' run by Shri Rajagopal. He also worked for the erstwhile Volkart Brothers (now Voltas Limited). In his absence, his younger brother M.G.Srinivasan took charge of the agricultural fields of the family household and ensured that the family had income to live.

=== Involvement with Chinmaya Mission ===
Natarajan was interested in Vedanta. After listening to the public talks of Swami Chinmayananda in the year 1952, Natarajan was involved with the Chinmaya Mission in various roles and was appointed secretary of the Mission within the first year of its inception. He attended sanskrit classes of P.S. Subramania Iyer, a retired Professor of English. It was Iyer who introduced the meter of chanting the Bhagavad Gita verses that was initially followed by Chinmaya Mission centres, and is followed even today by all the Arsha Vidya centres amongst other centres as well.

Swami Chinmayananda entrusted Natarajan with the responsibility to set up Chinmaya Mission's Madurai branch. In 1955, Natarajan accompanied Swami Chinmayananda to Uttarakashi and helped him in the preparation of a Gita manuscript for publication. In Uttarakashi, he met Swami Chinmayananda's Guru, Tapovan Maharaj, who advised him, 'You have a duty to yourself which is also important. Stay here, meditate and study.' Natarajan could not take up that offer at that point in time. However, he promised Swami Tapovan Maharaj that he would return after one year to study with him and he did. Natarajan returned to Madras and took up the editorship of Tyagi, a fortnightly magazine of Chinmaya Mission. In 1956, on the advice of Swami Chinmayananda, Natarajan shifted to Bengaluru and continued to edit Tyagi which was also moved to Bengaluru. During his stay, Natarajan joined the Sanskrit College in Chamrajpet and studied with Prof. Veeraraghavachariar.

=== Sannyasa ===
In 1961, with the permission of Swami Chinmayananda, Natarajan went to study under Swami Pranavananda at Gudivada to clarify his doubts on Vedanta and self-enquiry. The stay with Swami Pranavananda helped Natarajan learn that Vedanta is a Pramāna (a means of knowledge) to know the truth of the Self. In Natarajan's own words,

I saw the Swami giving direct knowledge to the people he was teaching. This resolved all my conflicts. My problems with Vedanta had been my mistaken notion that it was a system.

This shift in his vision about Vedanta impelled Natarajan to study the Shastra with Sankara's commentaries. In 1962, he was given Sannyasa by Swami Chinmayananda and named Swami Dayananda Saraswati. In 1963, he went to Mumbai, to the newly inaugurated Sandeepany Sadhanalaya of the Chinmaya Mission, where he undertook the responsibility of editing the magazine of the mission Tapovan Prasad. In addition, Swami Dayananda taught chanting of the Bhagavad Gita and the Upanishads to the students of Sandeepany.

In November 1963, Swami Dayananda undertook a study-pilgrimage to Rishikesh and stayed in a grass hut in Purani Jhadi now known as Dayananda Nagar. He spent three years there, studying Brahma Sutras under Swami Tarananda Giri at the Kailash Ashram.

=== Public talks ===
Around 1967, due to the declining health of Swami Chinmayananda, the Mission approached Swami Dayananda to give public talks and lectures. Between 1967 and 1970, Swami Dayananda travelled to different towns and cities in India spreading the teachings of Gita and the Upanishads. In 1971, Swami Dayananda agreed to conduct a long-term study program at Sandeepany Sadhanalaya, Powai, Mumbai and formulated a curriculum that would unfold the vision of Vedanta.

Between 1972 and 1979, Swami Dayananda conducted two three-year residential Vedanta courses in Mumbai. In his words,

At Sandeepany the teaching is traditional and rigorous. What would take a Sadhu in the Himalayas nine years to learn, the students at Sandeepany learned in two-and-half years.

In 1979, Swami Dayananda established a three-year study program at Sandeepany West in Piercy, California. In 1982, he returned to India and continued to spread the message of the Upanishads through public talks and lectures.

=== Final days ===
Swami Dayananda Saraswati died by the banks of the Ganga, surrounded by his devotees and students in the late evening of 23 September 2015. He had been ailing for some weeks and been in and out of hospitals for some time. He was 85 years of age. Swamiji's last rites were performed in the traditional manner as befitting a renunciate. He was buried in a grave, known as "bhu" samadhi, to the loud chanting of Vedic hymns and mantras. Many dignitaries, Hindu leaders and his students were there to pay their final respects.

== Arsha Vidya Centres ==
=== Teaching ===
Swami Dayananda assisted by his senior disciples has taught ten three-year programs (eight in India and two in the United States) and many of his students from these programs are now teaching all over the world. More than two hundred of his Sannyasi disciples are teaching Vedanta and Panini system of grammar. They form the Arsha Vidya Sampradaya.

=== Institutions ===
Swami Dayananda has established four traditional teaching centres and many more across the globe through his students with a primary focus on teaching Vedanta, Sanskrit and related disciplines. These traditional teaching centres are known as 'Arsha Vidya' or 'Arsha Vijnana' (Knowledge of the Rishis). The word 'Arsha' has been used by many of Swami Dayananda's students in naming their facilities to mark their lineage.

The four Arsha Vidya teaching centres that Swami Dayananda has established are:

- Arsha Vidya Peetham, Swami Dayananda Ashram, Rishikesh 249201, Uttarakhand, India
- Arsha Vidya Gurukulam, P.O. Box 1059, Saylorsburg, Pennsylvania 18353, USA
- Arsha Vidya Gurukulam, Anaikatti, Coimbatore – 641108, Tamil Nadu, India
- Arsha Vijnana Gurukulam, Amravati Road, Nagpur, Maharashtra, 410033, India

These residential centres conduct long-term courses, 1–2-week retreats, weekend study programs and family retreats throughout the year and the subjects taught include the Upanishads, Bhagavad Gita, Brahma Sutras and several other related texts of Vedanta. The study also includes the Sanskrit commentary of Adi Sankara on these texts, known as Bhashya. Along with these studies, Sanskrit language is also taught with Panini system of grammar. The Gurukuls also conduct sessions of daily meditation and satsangs. Additionally, yoga, Indian classical music, ayurveda, jyotisha and allied disciplines are also taught.

Swami Dayananda initiated another centre at his birth place, Manjakkudi, a village in Tamil Nadu, under the aegis of Swami Dayananda Educational Trust (SDET). It manages an arts college, two higher secondary schools and a traditional Veda Pathasala. With the inauguration of the Swami Dayananda Memorial, residential study programmes are conducted by the disciples of Swami Dayananda.

Jnanapravaha, a Vedanta study centre, was designed to hand over the legacy of Swami Dayananda Saraswati's teachings at his birthplace in Manjakuddi. It is in this location, students of Vedanta discover the study material and resources necessary to further their knowledge in Advaita Vedanta.

The teaching centres founded by Swami Dayananda conduct programs for the public to study the knowledge of Vedanta. There are more than sixty centres in India and across the globe that carry on the tradition of Vedantic teaching under the banner of "Arsha Vidya".

=== Students ===
The media has referred to Narendra Modi, the Prime Minister of India and actor Rajinikanth as disciples of Swami Dayananda Saraswati. The prominent sannyasi disciples of Swami Dayananda include Swami Suddhananda Saraswati who administered the Swami Dayananda Ashram at Rishikesh. Due to ill health, he later handed over the administration of the Ashram to Swami Sakshatkrtananda Saraswati, who serves as the current head and chief acharya of the ashram. Swami Viditatmananda Saraswati serves as the head and chief acharya at the Arsha Vidya Gurukulam in Saylorsburg, Pennsylvania. Swami Sadatmananda Saraswati serves as the head and chief acharya at Arsha Vidya Gurukulam at Annaikatti, Coimbatore. Swamini Brahmaprakasananda heads the Arsha Vijnana Gurukulam at Nagpur.

Some of his other senior disciples are Swami Paramarthananda, Swami Tattvavidananda, Swami Suddhabodhananda, Swami Brahmatmananda, Swami Tadatmananda, Swami Paramatmananda, Swami Nijananda, Swami Tadrupananda, Swamini Brahmalinananda, Swami Paripoornananda and Swamini Svatmavidyananda. All teachers from the Arsha Vidya tradition impart the knowledge of Advaita Vedanta around the world to seekers as taught by Swami Dayananda Saraswati.

Prominent disciples include Swami Omkarananda Saraswati, who led the Bhuvaneshwari Peetam in Malamelkudi, Pudukottai and was appointed by Swami Dayananda Saraswati to head the Dharma Rakshana Samithi (DRS).

Other students include Anantanand Rambachan, a professor of religion at St. Olaf College, Minnesota (USA), and Vasudevacharya, previously Dr. Michael Comans, former faculty member in the Department of Indian Studies at the University of Sydney. Radha (Carol Whitfield, Ph.D.) an early student of Swami Dayananda helped establishing Sandeepany West and Arsha Vidya Gurukulam at Saylorsburg USA, Arsha Kulam in California a centre for teaching of Advaita Vedanta.

== Associated organisations, activities, and dialogues ==
=== All India Movement for Seva ===
In addition to teaching, Swami Dayananda has initiated various philanthropic efforts. He founded the All India Movement for Seva (AIM for Seva) in the year 2000, with the vision of transforming society through a network of service, to bridge the urban-rural divide, thereby, empowering every person to contribute to the progress of the nation. The focus was on value-based education and reaching out to the children of rural India through a network of Chatralayams (Free student hostels) and schools. Swamiji proposed not alienate the child during their schooling and that parents are required initially to attend the school until the child is comfortable in the environment away from home.

In 2002, a major project witnessing growth in 2023 was initiated by Swami Dayanandaji. Located in Sriperumbudur in Tamil Nadu, "Swami Dayananda Krupa Home" provides lifetime therapy and support to men and children with developmental delays. Awarded consultative status with ECOSOC (Economic and Social Council) by the United Nations in 2005, this organisation is focused on serving people in the remote, rural areas of India, in the areas of education and health care.

=== Arsha Vidya Research and Publication Trust ===
The Arsha Vidya Research and Publication Trust (AVRandPT) is the source for Swami Dayananda's teaching and writings. It is a registered non-profit organisation since 21 February 2005, and is head-quartered in Mylapore, Chennai. AVRandPT publishes Swamiji's teachings, covering his decades of classes, public lectures and short and long term courses. These are available in printed book form, audio, video, ebook formats and on card pen drives. The trust has also created a mobile app, "Teachings of Swami Dayananda", which is available for Android and iOS.

=== Hindu Dharma Acharya Sabha ===
In 2000, as an initiative of the Hindu Dharma Acharya Sabha, an apex body of Hindu religious heads of the various Sampradayas was created and convened by Swami Dayananda Saraswati's efforts. A congregation of the heads of various traditions meet, discuss contemporary issues concerning Hinduism and provide leadership and service to the society and country.

=== Dharma Rakshana Samiti ===
In 1999, Dharma Rakshana Samiti was started by Sri Dayananda Saraswati to preserve Hinduism, its vision and way of life as the spiritual culture of India. Swamiji recognised that Hinduism, in present times, needs to be protected and preserved by its adherents.

=== Inter-religious dialogue and international forums ===
Swami Dayananda has supported several inter-religious dialogues. He has participated in Hindu-Jewish conferences facilitated by the World Council of Religious Leaders under that organisation's "Religion One on One" initiative. He had also participated in two Hindu-Buddhist summits. The first one, organised by the Global Peace Initiative of Women, held in Phnom Penh, Cambodia, in 2009 and the second one was organised in Colombo, Sri Lanka, in 2010.

Sri Swami Dayananda has participated and contributed to a number of other international forums including:

- United Nations gathering of NGOs in 1980
- UNESCO Seoul Global Convention in September, 1995
- United Nations 50th Anniversary Celebration in October, 1995
- Millennium World Peace Summit in New York, September 2000
- Initiated the International Congress for the Preservation of Religious Diversity – in Delhi, November 2001
- The Conference on the Preservation of Sacred Sites in Taipei in June, 2002
- Initiated the World Council for Preservation of Religious Diversity in Bangkok June, 2002
- The Global Peace Initiative of Women in Geneva, October 2002
- Initiated a Hindu-Christian dialogue with the World Council of Churches in Geneva, October 2002
- Youth Peace Summit in Nairobi 2003

=== Restoration of temples, practices and worship ===
Swami Dayananda has promoted the preservation of ancient cultures, religious and spiritual practices of India that have survived several millennia yet struggle in modern times due to lack of support. He has started several Veda Pathashalas (Centers of Learning of Vedas) for the preservation of Vedas and Agamas to prevent their extinction due to a lack of infrastructure for learning.

Swami Dayananda had appointed 35 oduvars in ancient Siva temples and paid them monthly allowance to sing the "Panniru Tirumurai", songs explaining Saiva Siddhanta philosophy.

Swami Dayananda helped building five chariots for Sri Mahalingaswamy Temple at Tiruvidaimarudur near Kumbakonam in 2010 at a cost of more than five crore rupees and provided funds for the annual chariot festival.

Swami Dayananda Saraswati filed a Writ Petition (W.P. 476/2012) before the Supreme Court of India challenging the Constitutional validity of various provisions of the Hindu Religious Endowments and Institutions Acts of Tamil Nadu, Andhra Pradesh and Pondicherry. This matter is now pending before the Supreme Court.

He supported Dr. Subramanian Swamy to defend and protect Ram Sethu when the Union Government wanted to create a channel breaking it. He helped Dr. Subramanian Swamy implead in the Chidambaram Temple Case in the year 2009. Though the Podu Dikshitars and Dr. Subramanian Swamy lost the case in the Chidambaram Temple matter before the Madras High Court, their appeals were allowed by the Supreme Court which by its judgment, dated 06-Jan-2014 threw the Government out of the Chidambaram Sri Natarajar Temple, by setting aside the judgments passed by the Madras High Court. The Supreme Court's Judgment in the Chidambaram Temple Case came as a boost for retrieving Hindu temples from Government control.

== Books ==
A non-exhaustive list of his books include:

- Can We?
- Conversion is Violence
- Gurupurnima
- Do All Religions Have the Same Goal?
- Danam
- Japa
- Moments With Krishna
- the True Teacher
- Hinduism and Its Uniqueness
- Purnamadah Purnamidam
- Dialogues With Swami Dayananda
- Discourses On Important Topics
- Action and Reaction
- Crisis Management
- Exploring Vedanta
- Freedom
- Freedom from Fear
- Freedom from Helplessness
- Freedom from Sadness
- Freedom from Stress
- Freedom in Relationship
- Friendship: The Essence of Vedic Marriage
- Fundamental Problem
- in the Vision of Vedanta
- Insights
- Introduction to Vedanta: Understanding the Fundamental Problem
- Teaching of the Bhagavad Gita
- Vision of Gita
- Kenopanishad
- Mundakopanishad (2 volume set)
- Taittiriya Upanishad (2 volume set)
- Mandukya Upanishad (4 volume set)
- Knowledge and Action: The Two Fold Commitment
- Living Versus Getting On
- Mahavakya Vichara
- Morning Meditation Prayers
- What's Meditation?
- Living Intelligently
- Successful Living
- Discovering Love
- Value of Values
- Need for Cognitive Change
- Vedic View and Way of Life
- Need for Personal Reorganisation
- Om Namo Bhagavate Vasudevaya
- Personal Re-Engineering in Management
- Personnel Management
- Prayer Guide
- Problem is You, the Solution is You
- Purpose of Prayer
- Sadhana and the Sadhya
- Sadhana Pancakam
- Satyam and Mithya
- Self-Knowledge
- Sri Rudram
- Sri Dakshinamurt Stotram
- Drk-Drsya-Viveka
- Vivekachudamani: Talks On 108 Selected Verses
- Vishnusahasranama: With Translation and Commentary
- Tattvabodha
- Stress-Free Living
- Surrender and Freedom
- Talks and Essays (Vol. i)
- Talks and Essays (Vol. ii)
- Talks and Essays (Vol. iii)
- Talks On "Who Am I?"
- Talks On Meditation
- Teaching Tradition of Advaita Vedanta
- Understanding Between Parents and Children
- Vedanta 24 X 7
- Wedding Ceremony Based On Hindu Concepts
- What You Love is the Pleased Self
- Yoga of Objectivity
- You Are the Whole

=== Books about Sarawati ===
- Teacher of Teachers – biography by Padma Narasimhan
- Contributions and Writings – biography by Sheela Balaji

== See also ==
- Swami Sivananda
