= TVS Motor Company =

Indian multinational motorcycle manufacturer

TVS Motor Co., Ltd.
- Trade name: tvsmotor
- Formerly: T. V. Sundram Iyengar & Sons Limited
- Type: Public
- Traded as: BSE: 532343; NSE: TVSMOTOR
- ISIN: INE494B01023
- Industry: Automotive
- Founded: 1911; 115 years ago
- Founder: T. V. Sundram Iyengar
- Headquarters: Chennai, Tamil Nadu, India
- Area served: Worldwide
- Key people: Venu Srinivasan (Chairman Emeritus); Sudarshan Venu (Managing Director)
- Products: Two-wheeler; Three-wheeler; Automobile parts
- Services: Vehicle service
- Revenue: ▲₹44,089 crore (US$4.6 billion) (FY25)
- Operating income: ▲₹6,575 crore (US$680 million) (FY25)
- Net income: ▲₹3,535 crore (US$370 million) (FY25)
- Owner: TVS Holdings (50.26%)
- Number of employees: 5,133 (2020)
- Parent: TVS Group
- Subsidiaries: Norton Motorcycle Company
- Website: www.tvsmotor.com

TVS Motor Co., Ltd. is an Indian multinational motorcycle manufacturer headquartered in Chennai. It is the third-largest motorcycle company in India by revenue. The company has annual sales of three million units and an annual production capacity of over four million vehicles. TVS Motor Company is also the second largest two-wheeler exporter in India with exports to over 60 countries.

TVS Motor Company is the largest subsidiary of TVS Group in terms of valuation and turnover.

== History ==
T. V. Sundram Iyengar began with Madurai's first bus service in 1911 and founded TVS, a company in the transportation business with a large fleet of trucks and buses under the name of Southern Roadways.

=== Early history ===
Sundaram Clayton was founded in 1962 in collaboration with Clayton Dewandre Holdings, United Kingdom. It manufactured brakes, exhausts, compressors and various other automotive parts. The company set up a plant at Hosur in 1976, to manufacture mopeds as part of their new division. In 1980, TVS 50, India's first two-seater moped rolled out of the factory at Hosur in Tamil Nadu, India. A technical collaboration with the Japanese auto giant Suzuki Ltd. resulted in the joint-venture between Sundaram Clayton Ltd and Suzuki Motor Corporation, in 1987. Commercial production of motorcycles began in 1989.

=== Recent ===
TVS Apache RTX 300

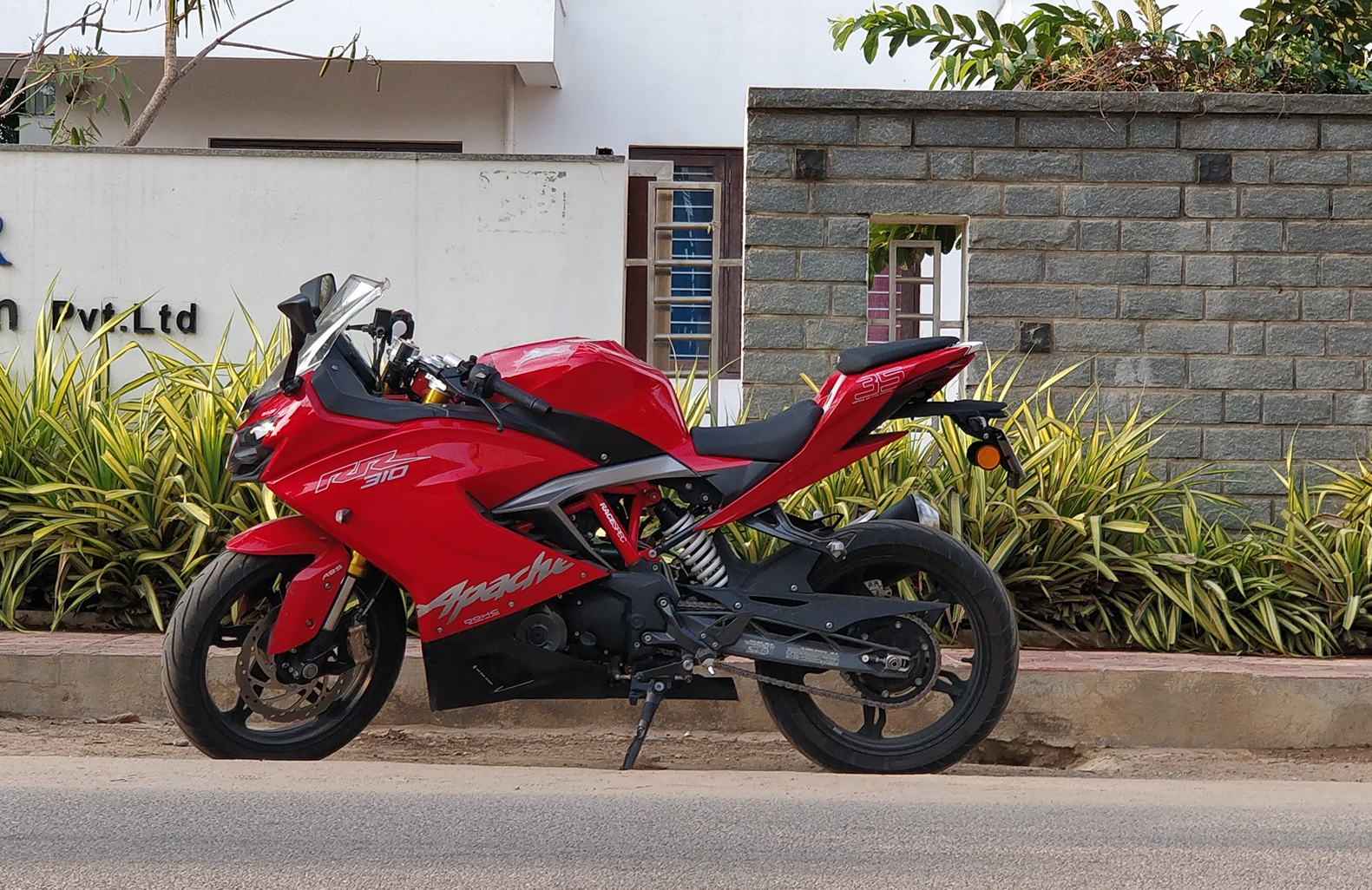
TVS Apache RR 310 is their latest 310 cc motorcycle

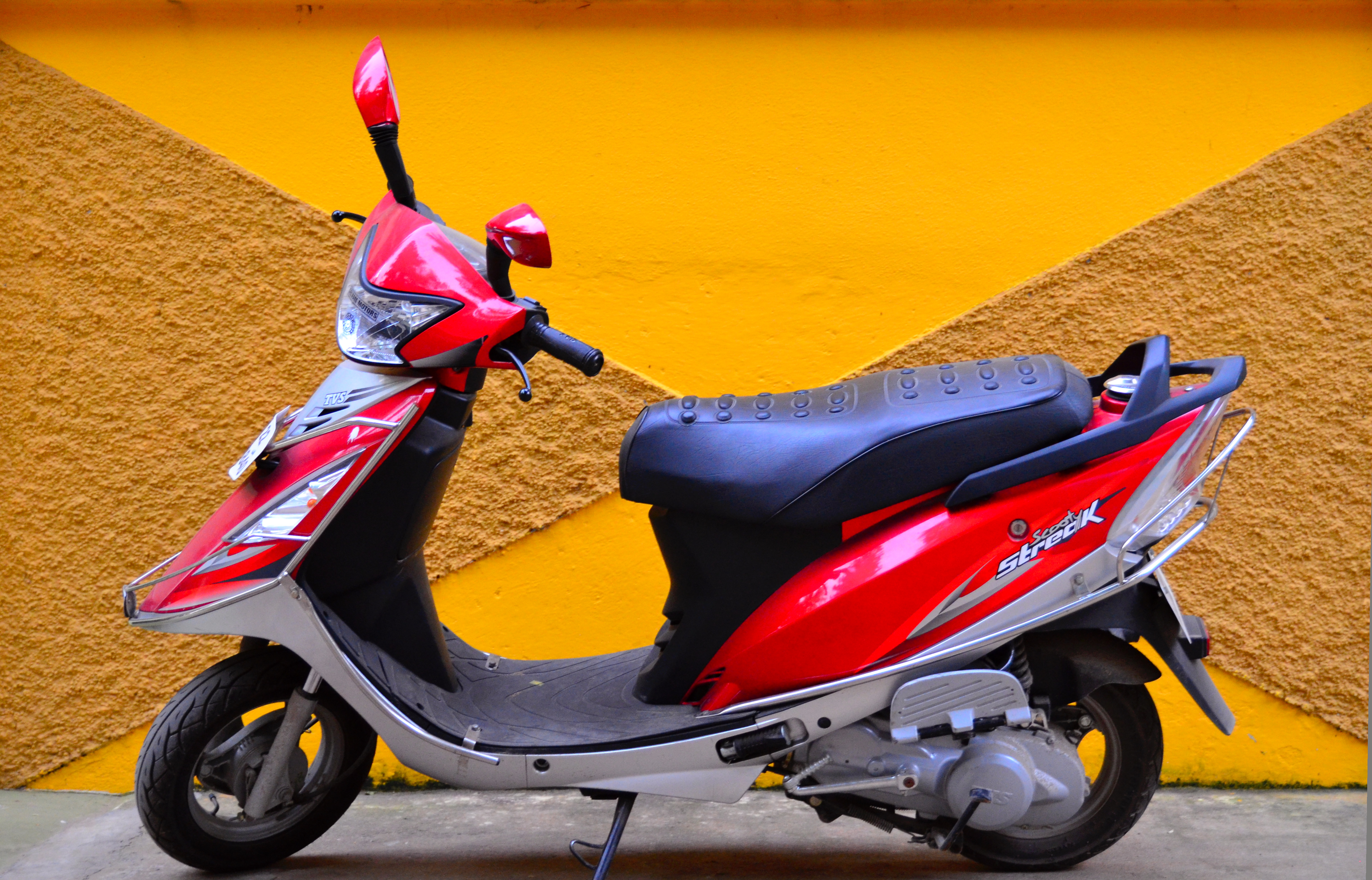
TVS Scooty Streak – one of the discontinued scooters of Scooty series

Recent launches include the flagship model TVS Apache RTX 300, TVS Apache RR 310, the TVS Apache RTR 200, TVS Victor and TVS XL 100. TVS has recently won 4 top awards at J.D. Power Asia Pacific Awards 2016, 3 top awards at J.D. Power Asia Pacific Awards 2015 and Two-Wheeler Manufacturer of the Year at NDTV Car & Bike Awards (2014–15).

In early 2015, TVS Racing became the first Indian factory team to take part in the Dakar Rally, the world's longest and most dangerous rally. TVS Racing partnered with French motorcycle manufacturer Sherco, and named the team Sherco TVS Rally Factory Team. TVS Racing also won the Raid de Himalaya and the FOX Hill Super Cross held at Sri Lanka. In three decades of its racing history, TVS Racing has won over 90% of the races it participates in.

In 2016, TVS started manufacturing the BMW G 310 R, a model co-developed with BMW Motorrad after their strategic partnership in April 2013. In December 2018, the Hosur plant where the motorcycle is manufactured rolled out its 50,000th G310R series unit.

On 6 December 2017, TVS launched their most-awaited motorcycle, the Apache RR 310 in an event at Chennai. The 310 cc motorcycle with an engine which was co-developed with BMW features the first ever full fairing on a TVS bike, dual-channel ABS, EFI, KYB suspension kits, etc. It is expected to rival bikes like KTM RC 390, Kawasaki Ninja 250SL, Bajaj Pulsar and Dominar and Honda CBR 250R after hitting the market. The Apache RR 310 is designed and realised entirely in India.

On 17 April 2020, TVS Motor Company acquired Norton Motorcycle Company in an all cash deal. In the short term, they continued production of Norton 961 Commando motorcycles at Donington Park using existing staff. The Donington factory has closed, and production of the uprated 961 is carried out at Solihull.

In September 2025, TVS Motor Company announced that it would acquire Engines Engineering S.p.A., an Italian engineering firm and auto design company.

== See also ==
- TVS One Make Championship
