= Gandhigram Rural Institute =

Deemed university in Dindigul, India

Coordinates: 10.27958°N 77.933412°E

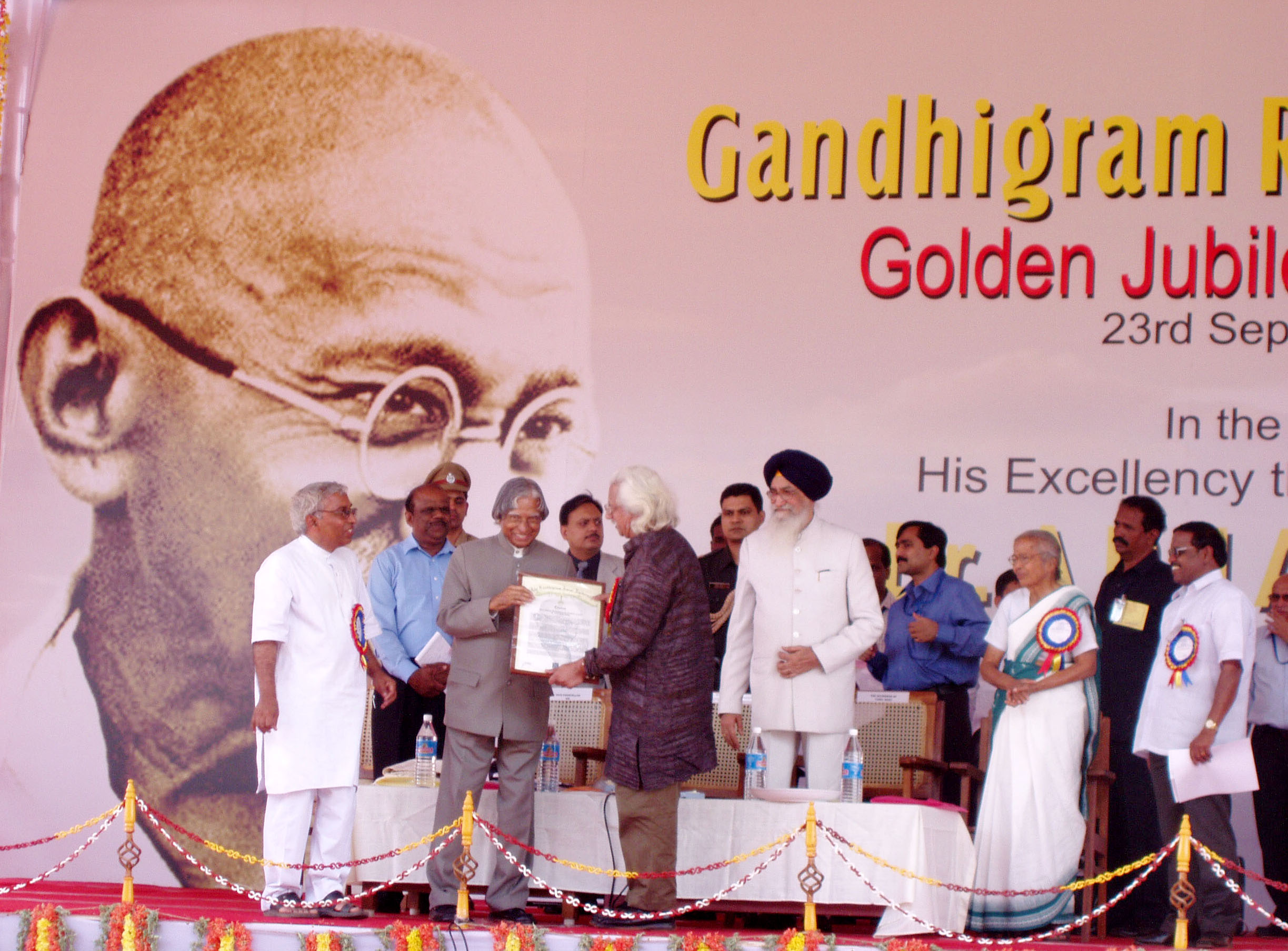
- Dr. A.P.J. Abdul Kalam in an event in the institute
- Other name: GRI
- Established: 1956; 70 years ago
- Affiliations: Ministry of Human Resource Development, UGC of India
- Chancellor: Dr. KM. ANNAMALAI
- Vice-Chancellor: Dr. N. Panchanatham
- Location: Gandhigram, Dindigul, India
- Campus: Rural
- Website: Official website

The Gandhigram Rural Institute (GRI) is a centrally-funded deemed university in Dindigul, Tamil Nadu, India.

== History ==
GRI was founded by G. Ramachandran and his wife T.S. Soundaram, in 1956. It adopted the education model of Mahatma Gandhi, Nai Talim. In 1976, it was declared a Deemed University by the University Grants Commission (UGC) under Section 3 of the UGC Act, 1956. It is fully funded by the UGC.

In 2006, it was renamed Gandhigram Rural Institute as per the guidelines of UGC.

The institute has developed into a major educational complex, comprising seven faculties, offering more than 50 programmes. It awards doctoral, master's and bachelor's degrees, diplomas, and certificates through its seven academic faculties: rural development, rural economics and extension education, rural-oriented sciences, cooperation, development administration, rural sociology, and English, Tamil and Indian languages.

It has 3000 students, 150 teaching and 250 non-teaching staff.

The institute was accredited with a five-star status by the National Assessment and Accreditation Council (NAAC) in 2002, and with an A grade during re-accreditation in 2010 and 2016.

== Campus ==
The Gandhigram Rural Institute has a campus of nearly 200 acres (0.81 km^{2}) in a rural setting, nestling in one of the enclaves of the Sirumalai range. To its west are chains of mountains including the Kodaikanal Hill Station. Lying north of Madurai, Gandhigram is easily accessible by rail and road. The climate is hot throughout the year.

== Alumni ==
- K. R. Meera, Indian Writer
- Raghavan (actor), Malayalam film industry
- Adoor Gopalakrishnan, Prominent director
- Pocker Kadalundi, Journalist
- Dr. E.Desingu Setty, Professor and Author

== Transport ==
The nearest railway station is Ambathurai, the nearest major railway junction is Dindigul and the nearest major city is Madurai. The nearest airport is Madurai Airport.

== Rankings ==
Gandhigram Rural Institute was ranked 91 among universities in India by the National Institutional Ranking Framework (NIRF) in 2020, rank 101–150 in 2021 and rank 151-200 in 2022.

== Former chancellors ==
- P. B. Gajendragadkar, seventh Chief Justice of India
- T. S. Soundram, Indian physician and politician
- R. Venkatraman, eighth President of India
- Shankar Dayal Sharma, eighth Vice President of India
- K.R. Narayanan, tenth President of India
- Krishan Kant, tenth Vice President of India
- Bhairon Singh Shekhawat, eleventh Vice President of India
- Mohammad Hamid Ansari, twelfth Vice President of India
- Renana Jhabvala, social worker in India

== Former vice chancellors ==
- G. Ramachandran, social reformer
- M. Aram, educator and peace activist
- Devendra Kumar
- D. K. Oza
- T. R. Natesan
- N. Markandan
- G. Pankajam
- T. Karunakaran
- Sm. Ramasamy
