= Thirukkurungudi =

Neighbourhood in Tirunelveli district, Tamil Nadu, India

- town
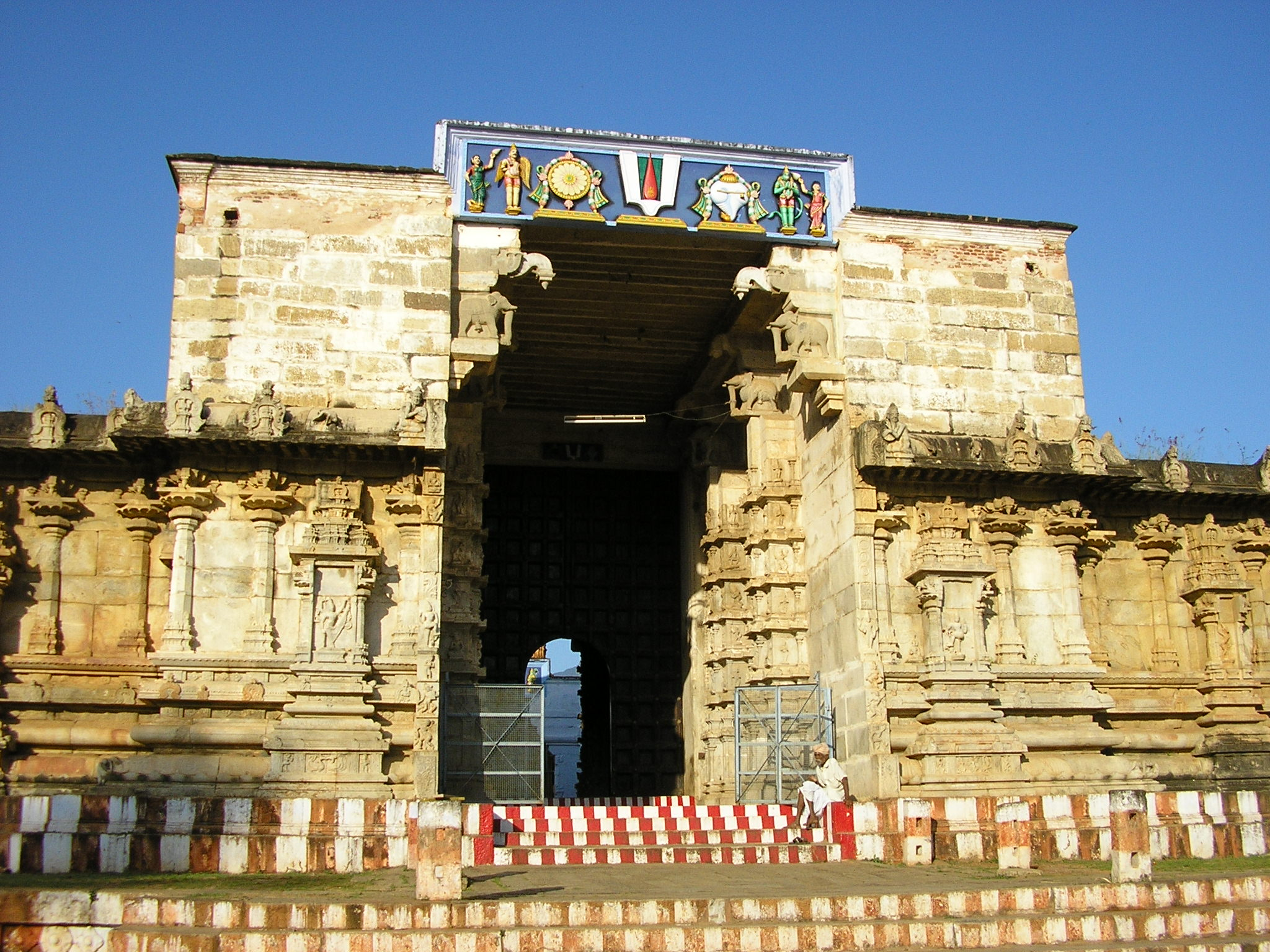
- Thirukkurungudi Nambi Temple

- Location in Tamil Nadu, India
- Coordinates: 8°26′52″N 77°33′43″E
- Country: India
- State: Tamil Nadu
- District: Tirunelveli

Population (2001)
  - Total: 8,871

Languages
  - Official: Tamil
- Time zone: UTC+5:30 (IST)
- PIN: 627115
- Vehicle registration: TN72

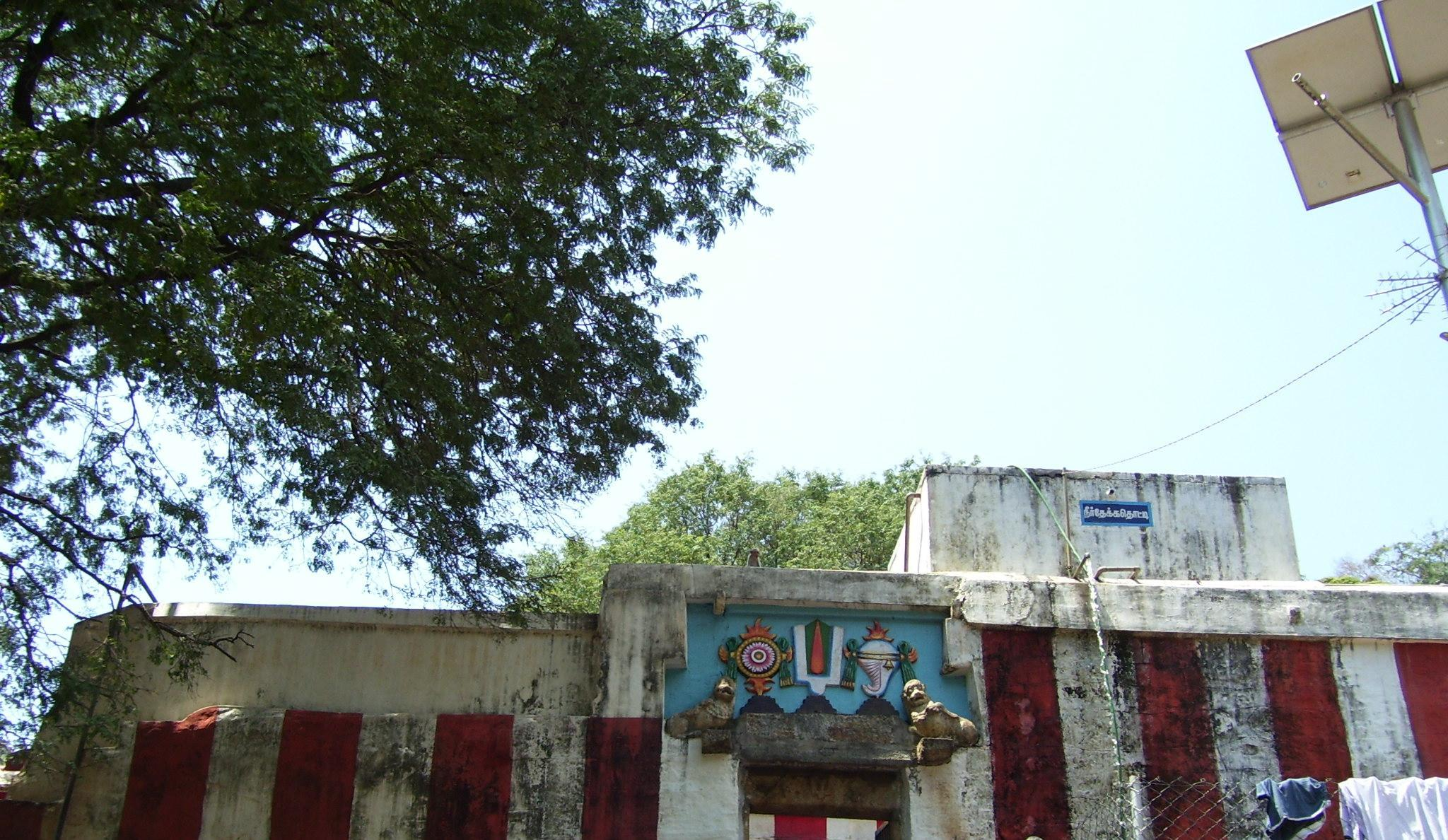
Mala Nambi Temple Entrance

Thirukkurungudi is a town which is located in Tirunelveli district, Tamil Nadu, South India. Thirukkurungudi is part of Nanguneri taluk and is part of the Tamil Nadu legislative assembly constituency of Nanguneri. At the foothills of the Western Ghats and 40 km to the North of Kanyakumari and about 120 km from Thiruvananthapuram the capital city of Kerala, Thirukkurungudi is a village with history dating back more than 1500 years. Village life revolves around agriculture and the Nambi Rayar temple. It is one of the 108 Divya Desams, Hindu temples that are sacred for the Vaishnavas.

Rice was the major crop until 15 years ago as there was plenty of rainfall and the River Nambi fed the irrigation channels for almost 9 months a year. With advancement in technology to tap ground water and rain becoming scarce, plantains have become a major crop. Almost every household works on something related to agriculture, either directly or through the Nambi Rayar temple.

The tank in Thirukkurungudi gets water from Western Ghats which is stored and fed for agriculture through five canals. The pond is a biodiversity hotspot supporting various forms of life from fish, birds, insects, plants, toads and an occasional python.

Thirukkurungudi is approachable by road. Distance is 45 km from Tirunelveli, 15 km from Nanguneri (Vanamamalai) and 10 km northwest of Valliyoor. The travel from thirukkurungudi to the malai nambi kovil is by through Jeep and also by walk so for Jeep the charge in this covid situation is 1500 per Jeep (5persons) and it is the town where the founder of TVS Sundaram Iyengar born

== Demographics ==
As of 2001 India census, Thirukkurungudi had a population of 8871. Males constitute 49% of the population and females 51%. Thirukkurungudi has an average literacy rate of 72%, higher than the national average of 59.5%: male literacy is 78%, and female literacy is 66%. In Thirukkurungudi, 11% of the population is under 6 years of age.

== Landmarks ==
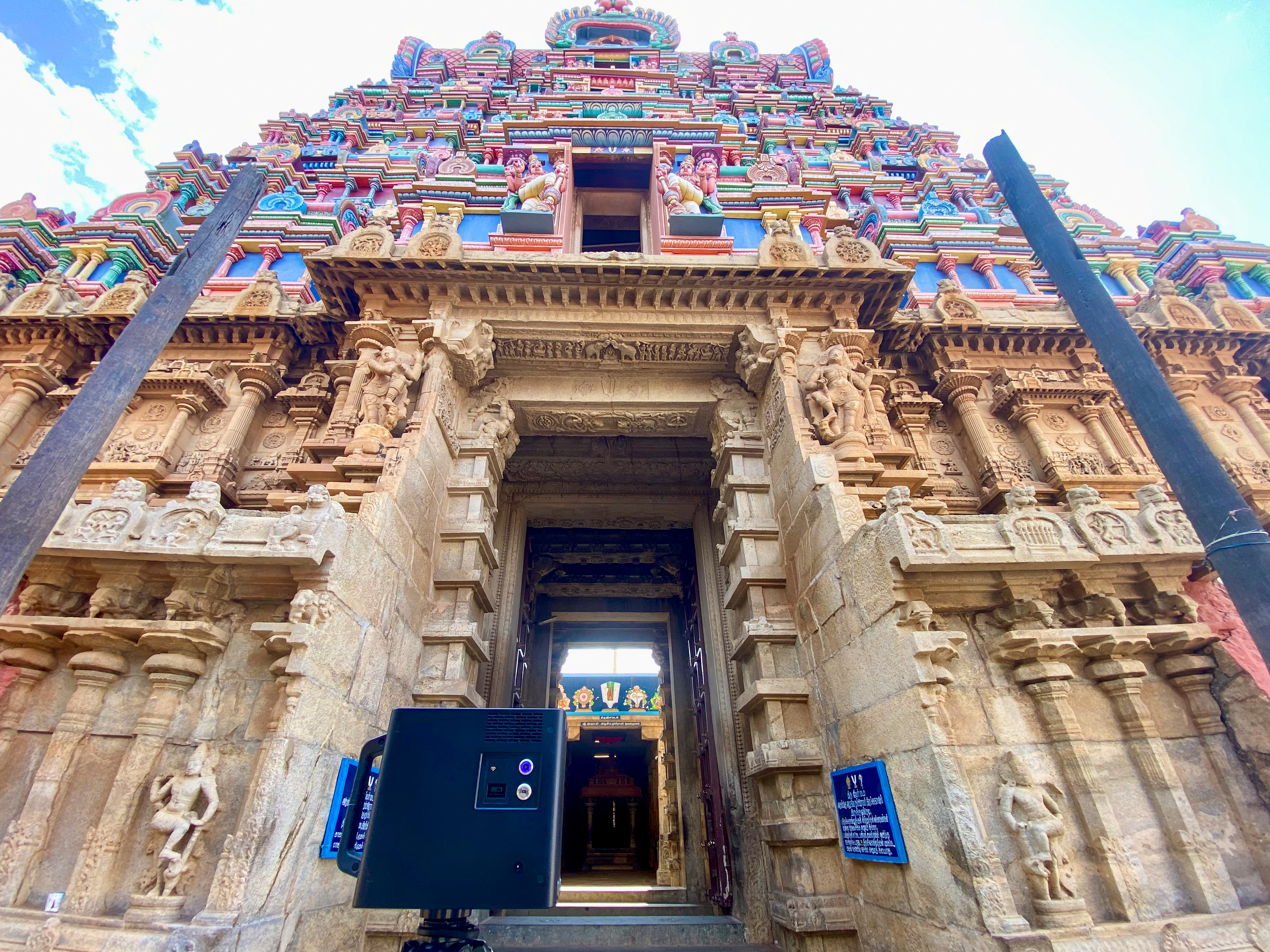
The rajagopuram of the Vaishnava Nambi Temple, the town's central landmark.

There are five Nambis in the temple. They are Ninra Nambi (Standing posture), Irundha Nambi (Sitting posture), Kidandha Nambi (Sleeping posture), Thiruparkadal Nambi and Thirumalai Nambi. Thiruparkadal Nambi Temple is located very near to the River Nambiyaru one km from the main temple. Thirumalai Nambi Temple is on the hills (Mahendragiri Mountain) 8 km from the main temple. In Tamil language the word "nambi" means personification of all virtuous and righteous qualities blended with beauty and grace.

Vaishnava Nambi and Thirukkurungudivalli Nachiar temple. Nambi Rayar temple is one of the "108 Divyadesams" of the Sri Vaishnavas. The temple is 2300 years old. The temple is located in the centre of the town flanked by four big Mada Veethis (Agraharams) and at the outer square by four broad and lengthy Ratha Veethis (Car Streets). The presiding deity of this Divya Desam was sung (Mangalasasanam) by four Alvars, namely Thirumalisai Piran, Nammalvar, Periyalvar, and Thirumangai Alvar. The temple has several unique sculptures. A horse and an elephant sculpture are composed of ladies in a single granite stone.

An unexpected and delightful moment at the Thirukkurungudi Temple Gopuram, with an elephant and a cat sharing the same space.

Beautifully carved Thirukkurungudi Main Gopuram, showcasing exquisite craftsmanship and intricate architectural details. Every carving tells a story of our rich temple heritage.

The intricately carved pillar corridor of Thirukkurungudi Temple, showcasing remarkable craftsmanship, timeless Dravidian architecture, and the artistic brilliance of our ancient temple heritage.

== Malai Nambi Koil ==
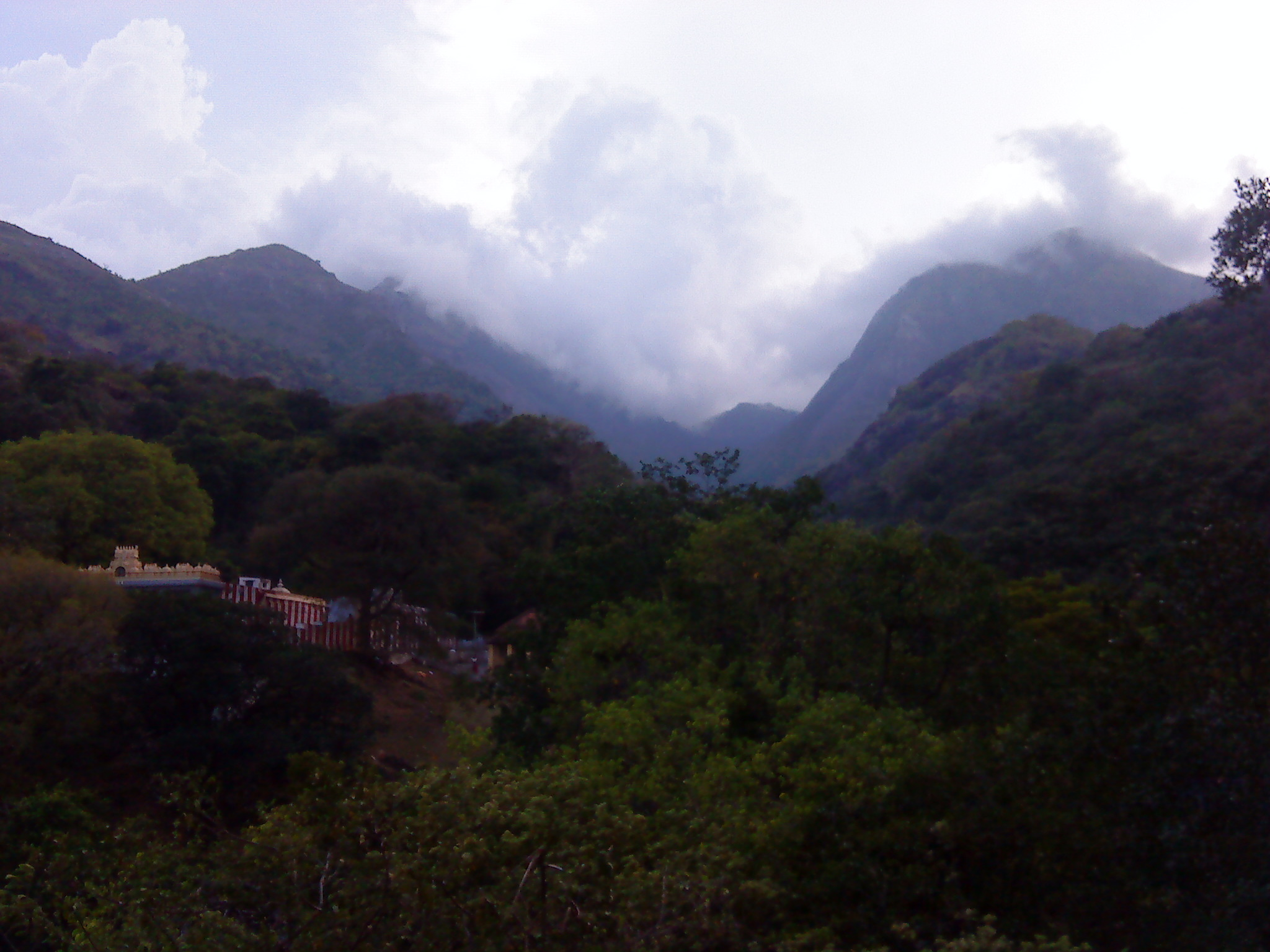
View of Mala Nambi Temple

Malai Nambi Koil is a mountain, 8 km from Thirukkurungudi village. It is a small mountain where auto, two wheelers can be hired from the foot hill. There are few steps that will take to the temple entrance. Lord Nambi with Bhoo Devi and Sri Devi are the idols in standing posture.

== Mahendragiri Mountain ==
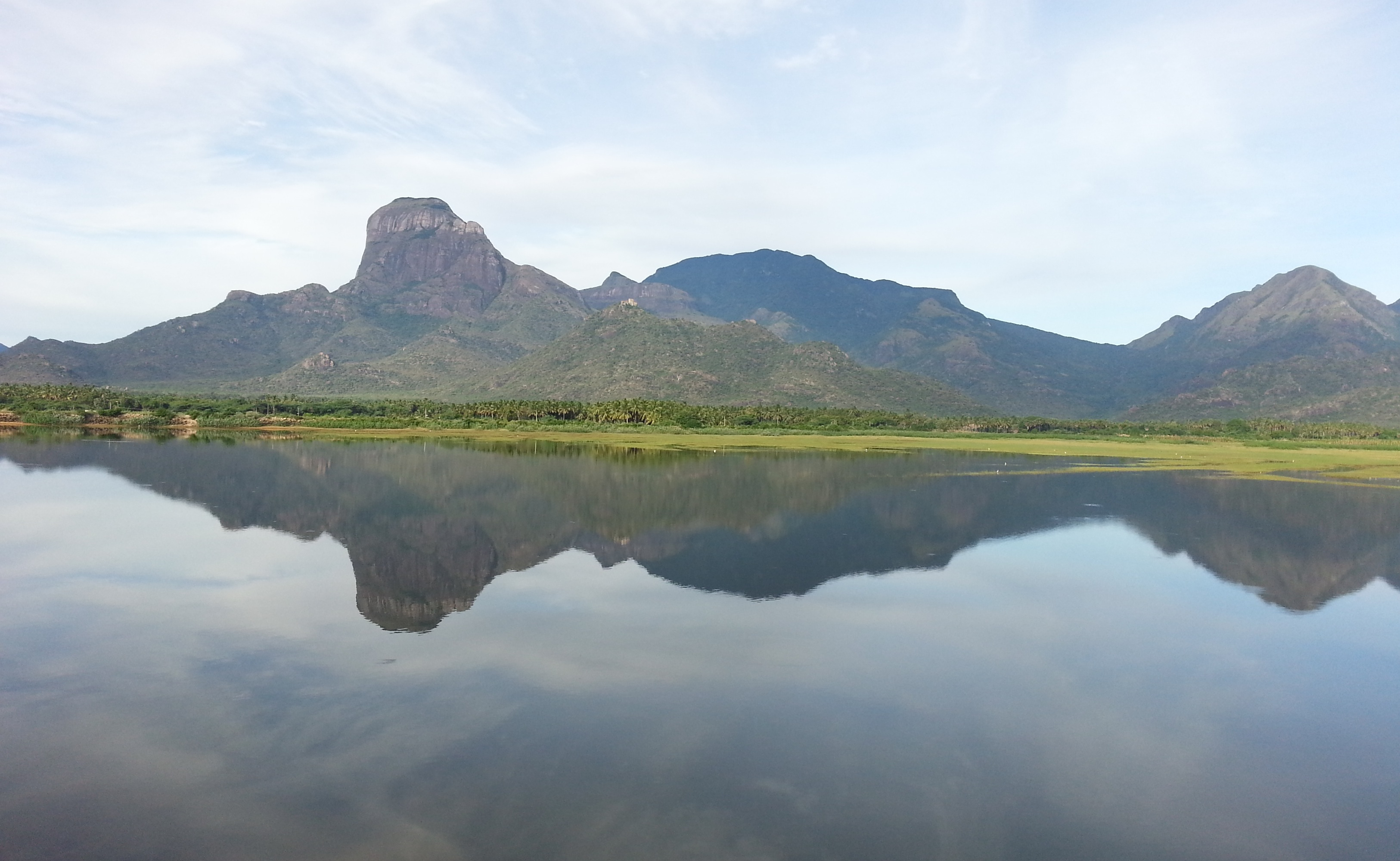
Thirukkurungudi big pond.

Mahendragiri Mountain near Thirukkurungudi has abundant medicinal herbs. This mountain is mentioned in the First Chapter of Srimad Valmiki Ramayanam Sundara Kandam. Hanuman while going to Sri Lanka in search of Seetha set his feet here and then travelled by sky route. There are many Siddha Purushas living in this mountain observing penance. ISRO is in Mahendragiri Hills 17 km from Thirukkurungudi.

== Notable people ==
Thirukkurungudi is the home town of the founder, T. V. Sundaram Iyengar of TVS Group.

== See also ==
- Vaishnava Nambi and Thirukkurungudivalli Nachiar Temple
