= TVS Holdings =

Indian automotive components company

- Formerly: Sundaram-Clayton Limited
- Type: Public
- Traded as: BSE: 520056; NSE: TVSHLTD
- Industry: Auto Ancillaries
- Founded: 1962; 64 years ago
- Founder: T. S. Srinivasan
- Headquarters: Chennai, Tamil Nadu, India
- Key people: R. Gopalan (Chairman); Lakshmi Venu (MD); Venu Srinivasan (Chairman Emeritus)
- Parent: TVS Group
- Divisions: Foundry and Machining
- Subsidiaries: TVS Motor Company (50.26%)
- Website: www.tvsholdings.com

TVS Holdings Limited, is an Indian automotive components company, based in Chennai. Part of the TVS Group, it makes aluminium and magnesium castings for the automotive industry. It was the flagship company of the TVS Group before being overtaken by its subsidiary TVS Motor Company.

The company was founded as Sundaram-Clayton Ltd in 1962 in collaboration with Clayton Dewandre Holdings plc, United Kingdom. It was renamed TVS Holdings Ltd in 2023 after the amalgamation of TVS Holdings Pvt Ltd into the company.

In May 2024, TVS Holdings acquired an 80.74% stake in Home Credit India.
