= Manjakkudi =

- Village
- Location in Tamil Nadu, India Manjakkudi (India)
- Coordinates: 10.835°N 79.50°E
- Country: India
- State: Tamil Nadu
- District: Tiruvarur district

Population
  - Total: 2,500

Languages
  - Official: Tamil
- Time zone: UTC+5:30 (IST)

Manjakkudi is a village on the banks of Kaveri river in Tiruvarur district in the Indian state of Tamil Nadu. It comes under the Kudavasal Taluk.

== Education ==
Manjakkudi is the educational hub of the entire district of Tiruvarur. It is one of the few villages in India where education facilities from kindergarten to a Masters program, including M. Phil, are provided.

== Rural BPO ==
WIPRO BPO, the Business Process Outsourcing arm of Wipro Technologies, are creating a centre at Manjakkudi. More than 50 employees working in Wipro.

== Rice varieties ==
In 2013 Sheela Balaji organised a festival here dedicated to grains. The annual festival has attracted farmers and it has led to the replanting of old rice varieties. Balaji was awarded the Nari Shakti Puraskar for her work preserving and growing rare rice varieties. The rice is sold in Chennai using a map of Manjakkudi is the logo.
