= TVS Group =

Indian multinational conglomerate

- Type: Private
- Industry: Conglomerate
- Founded: 1911; 115 years ago at Madurai
- Founder: T. V. Sundram Iyengar
- Headquarters: Chennai, Tamil Nadu, India (international headquarters); Madurai, Tamil Nadu, India (principal headquarters)
- Area served: Worldwide
- Products: Automobiles; Tyres; Auto Components; Energy; Motorcycles; Scooters; Auto rickshaw; Education; Transport; Real estate; Finance; Insurance; Textiles; Electronics
- Revenue: ▲US$8.5 billion (2019)
- Number of employees: 60,000 + (2024)
- Parent: T. V. Sundram Iyengar & Sons Private Limited
- Subsidiaries: TVS Motor Company; Norton Motorcycle Company; TVS Holdings; TVS Electronics; TVS Emerald; TVS Srichakra; TVS Credit System; TVS Supply Chain Solutions; Sundram Fasteners; Lucas-TVS; Brakes India; Delphi-TVS Diesel Systems; Axles India; Turbo Energy; Sundaram Textiles; Wheels India; TVS Lanka; TVS Next

TVS Group is an Indian multinational conglomerate with its principal headquarters in Madurai and international headquarters in Chennai. It has more than 50 subsidiaries including the two-wheeler manufacturer TVS Motor Company and TVS Supply Chain Solutions.

== Subsidiaries ==
The group's subsidiaries are owned by three holding companies, viz., TVS & Sons, Sundaram Industries and TVS Holding Companies. TVS & Sons is the parent company of the group. The three holding companies of the subsidiaries are:

- T. V. Sundram Iyengar & Sons Private Ltd. (TVS & Sons)
- Sundaram Industries Private Ltd.
- Southern Roadways Private Ltd. (TVS Holding Companies)

TVS Group's ten listed subsidiaries are:

- TVS Motor Company
- TVS Supply Chain Solutions
- Sundram Fasteners
- TVS Holdings (formerly Sundaram-Clayton)
- TVS Srichakra (TVS Eurogrip)
- Wheels India
- India Motor Parts & Accessories
- India Nippon Electricals
- TVS Electronics
- Sundaram Brake Linings
- Tsf Investments
- Sundaram Clayton
- Sundaram Finance

TVS Group's unlisted subsidiaries include:

- TVS Emerald
- Brakes India
- Turbo Energy
- TVS Investments
- Axles India
- Sundaram Textiles
- TVS Tread
- Sun Tyre & Wheel Systems
- Sundaram Dynacast
- TVS Automobile Solutions
- TVS Industrial & Logistics Parks
- Lucas-TVS
- Delphi-TVS
- TVS Next
- TVS Credit

== Family ==
T. V. S. family
- Current region: Chennai, Tamil Nadu, India
- Origin: Madurai, Tamil Nadu, India
- Members: T. V. Sundram Iyengar; T. S. Soundaram; Sheela Balaji; Venu Srinivasan; Lakshmi Venu; Anita Ratnam

The T. V. S. family is an Indian business family, based in Chennai, India. The TVS Group has its principal headquarters in Madurai and international headquarters in Chennai. It has more than 50 subsidiaries across sectors. T. V. Sundram Iyengar founded the group in 1911 with the establishment of T. V. Sundram Iyengar & Sons in Madurai.

The family is from the Iyengar community – Tamil Brahmins who are adherents of Sri Vaishnavism – hailing from Tirunelveli district. The founder T. V. Sundram Iyengar was born in 1877 in Thirukkurungudi. Sundram Iyengar qualified as a lawyer, and later worked in the Indian Railways and later in a bank. He later moved to Madurai and founded the TVS group.

=== Family tree ===
Sundram Iyengar and Lakshmi Ammal had eight children – five sons and three daughters. The five sons all joined the family business. The eldest son – T. S. Doraisamy died in 1943 and the other four sons – T. S. Rajam, T. S. Santhanam, T. S. Srinivasan and T. S. Krishna continued to run different businesses. Of the daughters, Dr. T. S. Soundaram was a physician, social reformer and politician.

T. V. Sundram Iyengar
T. S. Doraiswami	T. S. Rajam	T. S. Krishna	T. S. Santhanam	T. S. Srinivasan	T. S. Soundaram
R. Ramachandran	R. Ratnam	Suresh Krishna	K. Ramesh	K. Mahesh	S. Ram	Prema Ramanujam	S. Viji	Venu Srinivasan	Sheela Balaji	Gopal Srinivasan

== Real estate ==
Emerald Haven Realty Limited, operating as TVS Emerald, is the real estate subsidiary of the TVS Group. Headquartered in Chennai, Tamil Nadu, the company was incorporated in 2012 and develops residential properties across Chennai and Bangalore.

TVS Emerald signed a platform agreement with HDFC Capital for ₹1,000 crore towards plotted developments in 2023. In the financial year 2022–23, the company sold over 1,000 units, generating revenues exceeding ₹925 crore. The company expanded into the Bangalore market with projects in North Bangalore, including developments in Sathanur along the Bagalur–Thanisandra corridor.

== See also ==
- Sundaram Finance, a former subsidiary of the group which now operates independently
