= Chinnalapatti =

Chinnalapatti Chinnalapattu
- City
- Location in Tamil Nadu, India
- Coordinates: 10.30°N 77.93°E
- Country: India
- State: Tamil Nadu
- District: Dindigul
- Zone: Madurai

Population (2021)
  - Total: 42,000

Languages
  - Official: Tamil
- Time zone: UTC+5:30 (IST)
- PIN: 624301
- Telephone code: 0451
- Website: www.chinnalapatti.com

Chinnalapatti is a Panchayat town and city in Dindigul district, Tamil Nadu in India with a total population of about 26285 (as per 2011 census). In 2021 most of the wards are merged to accommodate it to 18 wards, as chinnalapatti is still a town panchayat city. It is understood that the number of voters are 29000 and population would be around 42000. Making it the largest town panchayat city in Dindigul district. The city is well known for the handloom sarees and garments. The place is located next to Sirumalai hills which has lot of grapes farmlands.

== Demographics ==
According to the 2011 India census, Chinnalapatti had a population of 26,285. Males constitute 50% of the population and females compose the other 50%. Chinnalapatti has an average literacy rate of 87.06%. This is higher than the state average of 80.09%; with male literacy of 93.12% and female literacy of 81.23%. 8.51% of the population is under 6. The town's economy is based on textiles and agriculture. Agriculture dominates North Chinnalapatti.

Chinnalapatti Town Panchayat city hosts over 6,981 houses (as per 2011 India census) to which it supplies basic amenities including water and sewage. It is authorized to build roads within Town Panchayat limits and impose taxes.

== Administration ==
Chinnalapatti Special grade Town Panchayat city is divided into 18 wards, for which elections are held every 5 years.

== Politics ==
Chairman of Panchayat: Thirumathi. Prdeepa Kanagaraj, Chinnalapatti Town Panchayat city Vice Chairman of Panchayat: Thirumathi. P.Ananthi Bharathi raja Chinnalapatti Town Panchayat city

== Economy ==
Chinnalapatti's economy mainly depends on the handloom weaving industry and is known for it. Weaving has been a way of life in Chinalapatti for centuries. Workers produce cotton (Sungudi) saris with Zari borders, which are accepted for daily wear. The Sungudi saree industry includes looming, weaving, dyeing and printing units. The Sungudi industry provides a livelihood for more than 10,000 workers. Textile export and import is an important complementary business. Sungudi sarees from Chinnalapatti are exported to Singapore, Malaysia, Sri Lanka and South Africa. The town is active in areas such as wet grinder assembly, wire chair production, Alimarh production and dyeing.

=== Sarees ===
Silk sarees (famously known as "Chinnalappattu") and Sungudi sarees are made in the traditional way. Since saris are less common in many places, Chinnalapatti weavers expanded to make increasingly popular sungudi chudithars.

== Culture ==
Most of people in Chinnalapatti are conservative Hindus and practice traditional festivals.

Notable festivals include kalla Alagar(சித்திரை திருவிழா), North street muthalamman, Bheedhi Devru Mokku (street worship of God in Kannada) and Sri Ramalinga Sowdeeswari Amman Festival.

They also celebrate Kamayasamy, the festival for “Cupid – the god of love” annually, a tradition held for the past 140 years. It runs for twelve days ending on a full moon.

== Transport ==
Chinnalapatti is on National Highway 7 (NH7) which connects Madurai with Dindigul. It has a bus facility with buses operated by Government and private sectors. Mofussil buses operate along NH-7.

Ambaturai is the nearest railway station. Passenger and some express trains stop there.

Madurai Airport is the nearest airport.

== Hospitals ==
The medical needs of the town and surrounding villages are served by multiple hospital facilities in the city. Some of the well known hospitals are

- Kasturba hospital is the oldest hospital spreading in acres, serves large number of patients every day. The hospital is now a multi specialty hospital and known for its maternity centers with more than 300 beds.
- Shanmugam nursing home - multi specialty hospital well known for maternity center in the town.
- Harish hospital - multi specialty hospital located near Poonjolai
- Govt. Health center - serves many of the people in the town and from nearby villages
- Lakshmi Seva Sangam - Biggest Siddha product manufacturing center. Siddha doctors visit outpatients at particular time every day.

== Education ==
Chinnalapatti has 3 Higher Secondary Schools.

- Devangar Higher Secondary School
- Devangar Girls Higher Secondary School
- Thambithottam Higher Secondary School which is a part of Gandhigram Trust.

== Landmark ==
The town has several Hindu temples and churches. Sri Anjali Varadha Anjaneyar temple is located at Mettupatti location and contains a 16 feet high Anjaneyar god statue.
