= T. V. Sundram Iyengar =

Indian businessman (1877–1955)

- Born: Thirukkurungudi Vengaram Sundram Iyengar; 22 March 1877; Thirukkurungudi, Tinnevely District, Madras Presidency, British Raj (Present day Tirunelveli District, Tamil Nadu, India)
- Died: 28 April 1955 (aged 78); Kodaikanal, Madurai District, Madras State, India (Present day Dindigul District, Tamil Nadu, India)
- Occupation: Industrialist
- Children: 8, including T. S. Soundaram
- Relatives: TVS family

Thirukkurungudi Vengaram Sundram Iyengar (22 March 1877 – 28 April 1955) was an Indian industrialist and automobile pioneer. He started his career as a pinewood dealer and later in 1911, he founded T. V. Sundram Iyengar & Sons, a bus company which later diversified into automobile production and emerged as the parent company of the TVS Group, one of India's biggest business conglomerates. With his humble beginning as a lawyer, he grew into one of the most successful industrialists of his time. The flagship company of the group is TVS Motors established by his son T. S. Srinivasan. He laid foundation for road transport industry in the erstwhile Madras Presidency through the state's first bus service. The TVS group he thus started now extends from motor industry, auto services to financial services.

== Birth and early life ==
T. V. Sundram Iyengar was born in a Iyengar Tamil Brahmin family in early 1877 in Thirukkurungudi, in the state of Tamil Nadu in India. Sundram Iyengar started his career as a lawyer. As per his father's wishes, he then moved to work for the Indian Railways and later in a bank.

== As an industrialist ==
Sundram Iyengar later quit his jobs and laid the foundation for the motor transport industry in South India when he first started a bus service in the city of Madurai in the year 1911. He established the T. V. Sundram Iyengar and Sons Limited in 1911, which by his death in 1955, operated a number of buses and lorries under the title of Southern Roadways Limited. This paved the way for the genesis of the TVS Group.

During the times of the second world war, Madras Presidency was met with petrol scarcity. To meet the demands, Sundram Iyengar designed and produced the TVS Gas Plant. He also started a factory for rubber retreading, besides two more concerns, the Madras Auto Service Ltd and the Sundaram Motors, a division of T. V. Sundram Iyengar & Sons Ltd. The former was the largest distributor for General Motors in the 1950s. What started as a single man's passion soon became the business of a family.

Sundram Iyengar had five sons and three daughters, and in his patriarchal Tamil Brahmin family all male members got into the business. With his son, T. S. Doraisamy's early death, four other sons — T. S. Rajam, T. S. Santhanam, T. S. Srinivasan and T. S. Krishna – became an integral part of the business, and ever since there have been four largely distinct branches that have worked under the TVS umbrella.

The group established by Sri Sundram Iyengar, according to the company, is currently the largest automobile distribution company in India, enjoys a turnover of about US$8.5 Billion and has an employee strength of over 60,000. The group operates in diverse fields like automotive component manufacturing, automotive dealerships, finance and electronics, as well as into IT solutions and services.

== Personal life ==
T. V. Sundram Iyengar married Lakshmi Ammal and they had eight children - five sons and three daughters. Their son T. S. Doraiswamy, died at an early age. T. V. Sundram Iyengar accepted his daughter T. S. Soundaram, then a teenage widow who remarried G. Ramachandran (social reformer), under the compulsion of Mahatma Gandhi. T. S. Soundaram then involved herself in the Indian independence movement along with Gandhi. She was later honoured with a postal stamp released in her honour.

Apart from being a successful business man, T. V. Sundram Iyengar was a patron of the arts. He was praised by C. Rajagopalachari, a senior statesmen and governor general of India at that time, for his gesture of retiring and handing over the trade to his sons.

== Later years and death ==
He died in the early hours of 28 April 1955 at his residence in Kodaikanal at the age of 78 and at that time was survived by his wife, four sons and three daughters.

== Honours ==
Sundram Iyengar was honoured by the Government of India by unveiling bust in bronze and in marble in the city of Madurai, Tamil Nadu on 7 August 1956.
