= K. K. Umadhevan =

- கே. கே. உமாதேவன்

Member of the Tamil Nadu Legislative Assembly
- In office 2001–2006
- Preceded by: R. Sivaraman
- Succeeded by: K. R. Periyakaruppan
- Constituency: Tiruppattur (Sivaganga)

Personal details
- Born: 6 September 1954 (age 72) Koothakkudi, Sivaganga district, Tamil Nadu, India
- Party: All India Anna Dravida Munnetra Kazhagam
- Education: Pre-University Course (PUC)
- Profession: Farmer

K. K. Umadhevan is an Indian politician and a former Member of the Legislative Assembly (MLA) of Tamil Nadu. He hails from Koothakkudi village in the Sivaganga district. Umadhevan completed his Pre-University Course (PUC). Representing the All India Anna Dravida Munnetra Kazhagam (AIADMK) party, he contested and won the 2001 Tamil Nadu Legislative Assembly election from the Tiruppattur Assembly constituency.

== Electoral performance ==
=== 2001 ===
2001 Tamil Nadu Legislative Assembly election: Tirupattur (Sivaganga)
Party	Candidate	Votes	%	±%
AIADMK	K. K. Umadhevan	50,165	38.69%	+6.68
DMK	R. Sivaraman	41,075	31.68%	−15.88
MDMK	Sevanthiappan Pulavar	4,589	3.54%	−0.08
Independent	P. Gunasekaran	1,646	1.27%	New
NCP	S. U. Gahan Raam Chattrapathi	1,142	0.88%	New
Margin of victory		9,090	7.01%	−8.55%
Turnout		129,674	62.26%	−4.42%
Registered electors		208,277		
AIADMK gain from DMK		Swing	-8.87%	
