= Wet market =

Market selling perishable goods, including meat, produce, and food animals

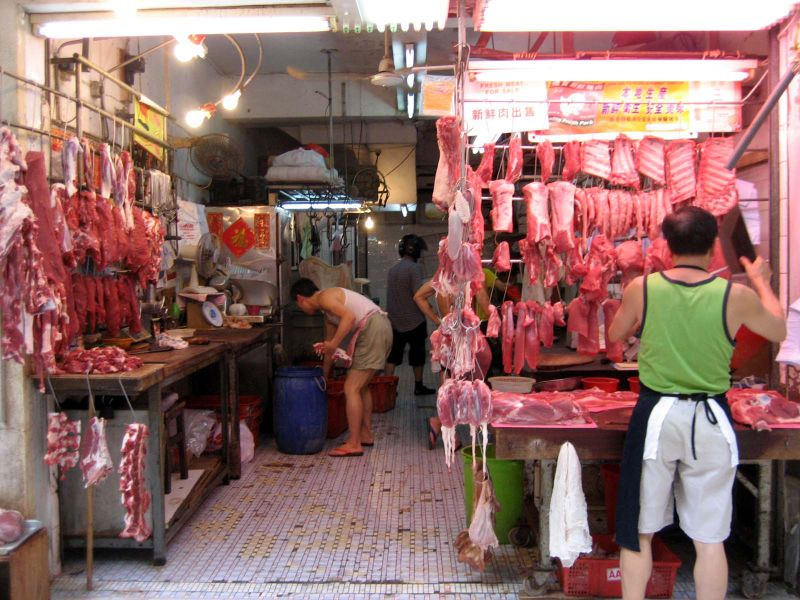
- A meat stall at a market in Hong Kong
- Traditional Chinese: 傳統市場
- Simplified Chinese: 传统市场
- Hanyu Pinyin: chuántǒng shìchǎng
- Jyutping: cyun^{4} tung^{2} si^{5} coeng^{4}
- Literal meaning: traditional market
Transcriptions
Standard Mandarin
- Hanyu Pinyin: chuántǒng shìchǎng
Yue: Cantonese
- Jyutping: cyun^{4} tung^{2} si^{5} coeng^{4}

Alternative Chinese name
- Traditional Chinese: 街市
- Simplified Chinese: 街市
- Jyutping: gaai^{1} si^{5}
- Literal meaning: street market
Transcriptions
Yue: Cantonese
- Jyutping: gaai^{1} si^{5}
- IPA: [kaj˥.si˩˧]

Wet market is a regional English term for a marketplace, also called a public market or a traditional market, that sells fresh foods, such as meat, fish, and produce, and other consumption-oriented perishable goods in a non-supermarket setting, as distinguished from "dry markets" that sell durable goods, such as fabrics, kitchenwares and electronics.

The term was popularised by the Singaporean government in the 1970s and did not originate in mainland China, where such markets are called "farmers' markets" or "produce markets". It was little known in English before the COVID-19 pandemic, when coverage of the Huanan Seafood Wholesale Market in Wuhan brought it to global prominence.

Such markets include a wide variety of types, such as farmers' markets, fish markets, and wildlife markets. Not all of them sell live animals, but the term is sometimes used to signify a live animal market in which vendors slaughter animals upon customer purchase, such as is done with poultry in Hong Kong. Such markets are common in many parts of the world, notably in China, Southeast Asia, and South Asia. They often play critical roles in urban food security due to factors of pricing, freshness of food, social interaction, and local cultures. Despite their importance in local food systems and livelihoods, they often lack essential food safety infrastructure, such as cold chains, standardized hygiene practices, regular inspection, and product traceability.

Most such markets do not trade in wild or exotic animals, but some that do have been linked to outbreaks of zoonotic diseases including COVID-19, H5N1 avian flu, severe acute respiratory syndrome (SARS), and mpox. Several countries have banned markets from holding wildlife. Media reports that fail to distinguish between food markets generally and those with live animals or wildlife, as well as insinuations of fostering wildlife smuggling, have been blamed for fueling Sinophobia related to the COVID-19 pandemic.

== Background ==
=== Terminology ===
The term "wet market" came into common use in Singapore in the early 1970s when the government used it to distinguish such traditional markets from the supermarkets that had become popular there. The term was added to the Oxford English Dictionary (OED) in 2016, as a term used throughout Southeast Asia. The OED's earliest cited use of the term is from The Straits Times of Singapore in 1978. The term did not originate in mainland China.

No Chinese name for these markets refers to wetness: in mainland China they are officially called nongmao shichang (农贸市场, "farmers' market") or cai shichang (菜市场, "produce market") and colloquially caichang (菜场), while in Hong Kong Cantonese they are jieshi (街市, "street market").

The "wet" in "wet market" refers to the constantly wet floors due to the melting of ice used to keep food from spoiling, the washing of meat and seafood stalls and the spraying of fresh produce that is common in these markets.

The term "public market" may be synonymous with "wet market", although it may sometimes refer exclusively to state-owned and community-owned markets. These markets may also be called "fresh food markets" and "good food markets" when referring to markets consisting of numerous competing vendors primarily selling fresh produce like fruits and vegetables. The term "wet market" is frequently used to signify a live animal market that sells directly to consumers, although the terms are not synonymous.

Although the term "wet market" may refer to markets that sell wild animals and wildlife products, it is not synonymous with the term "wildlife market" which exclusively refers to markets that contain wildlife products.

=== Types ===
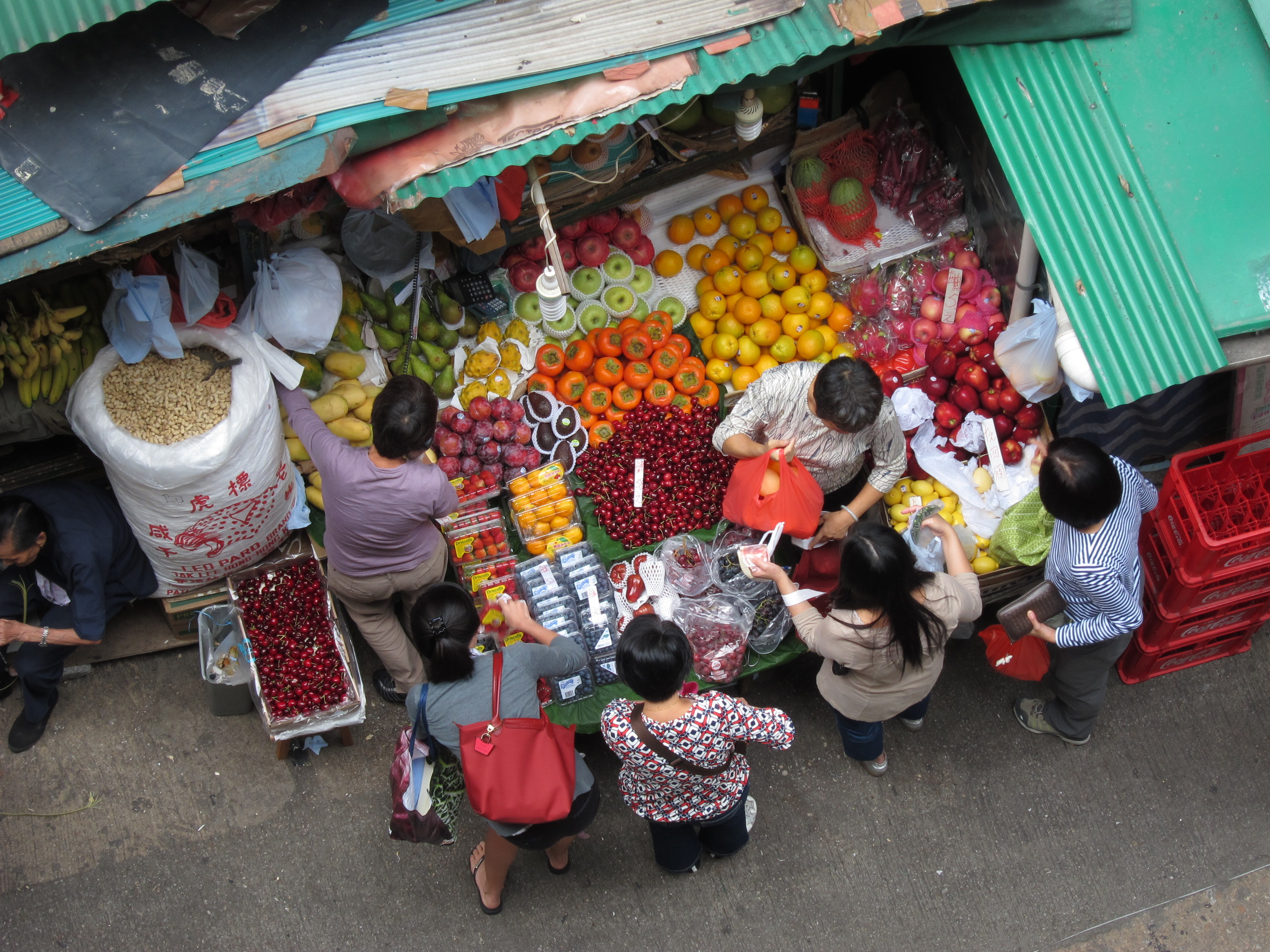
A fruit stall at a traditional open-air street market in Mid-Levels, Hong Kong

The term "wet market", which specifies markets that sell fresh produce and meat, includes a broad variety of markets. These markets can be categorized according to their ownership structure (privately owned, state-owned, or community-owned), scale (wholesale or retail), and produce (fruits, vegetables, slaughtered meat, or live animals). They can be further subcategorized based on whether the meat inventory originates from domesticated or wild animals.

Traditional markets are typically housed in temporary sheds, open-air sites, or partially open commercial complexes, while modern ones are housed in buildings often equipped with improved ventilation, freezing, and refrigeration facilities.

== Economic role ==
These markets are less dependent on imported goods than supermarkets due to their smaller volumes and lesser emphasis on consistency. They have been described in a 2019 food security study as "critical for ensuring urban food security", particularly in Chinese cities. Their roles in supporting urban food security include food pricing and physical accessibility.

Academic papers in urban studies, studies on food distribution, and the Singapore National Environment Agency have noted lower prices, greater freshness of food, and the facilitation of both bargaining and social interaction as key reasons for the persistence of these markets. Their persistence has also been attributed to "culinary traditions that call for freshly slaughtered meat and fish as opposed to frozen meats".

In developing countries with agriculture-based economies, fresh meat is mainly distributed through traditional markets or meat stalls. Markets selling fresh meat are often attached to, or located near, slaughter facilities.

== Wildlife markets and zoonoses ==
Influenza virus can change by genetic reassortment as it travels between different hosts in its range. The presence of different intermediate hosts in close proximity makes these markets a high risk environment for such zoonoses.

If sanitation standards are not maintained, these markets can spread disease. Those that carry live animals and wildlife are at especially high risk of transmitting zoonoses. Because of the openness, newly introduced animals may come in direct contact with sales clerks, butchers, and customers or to other animals which they would never interact with in the wild. This may allow for some animals to act as intermediate hosts, helping a disease spread to humans.

Outbreaks of zoonotic diseases including COVID-19, H5N1 avian flu, severe acute respiratory syndrome (SARS), and monkeypox have been traced to live wildlife markets where the potential for zoonotic transmission is greatly increased. Wildlife markets in China have been implicated in the 2002 SARS outbreak; it is thought that the market environment provided optimal conditions for the coronaviruses of zoonotic origin that caused both outbreaks to mutate and subsequently spread to humans. The exact origin of the COVID-19 pandemic is yet to be confirmed as of February 2021 and was originally linked to the Huanan Seafood Wholesale Market in Wuhan, China due to reports that two-thirds of the initial cases had direct exposure to the market, although a 2021 WHO investigation concluded that the Huanan market was unlikely to be the origin due to the existence of earlier cases.

Due to unhygienic sanitation standards and the connection to the spread of zoonoses and pandemics, critics have grouped live animal markets together with factory farming as major health hazards in China and across the world. In March and April 2020, some reports have said that wildlife markets in Asia, Africa, and in general all over the world are prone to health risks.

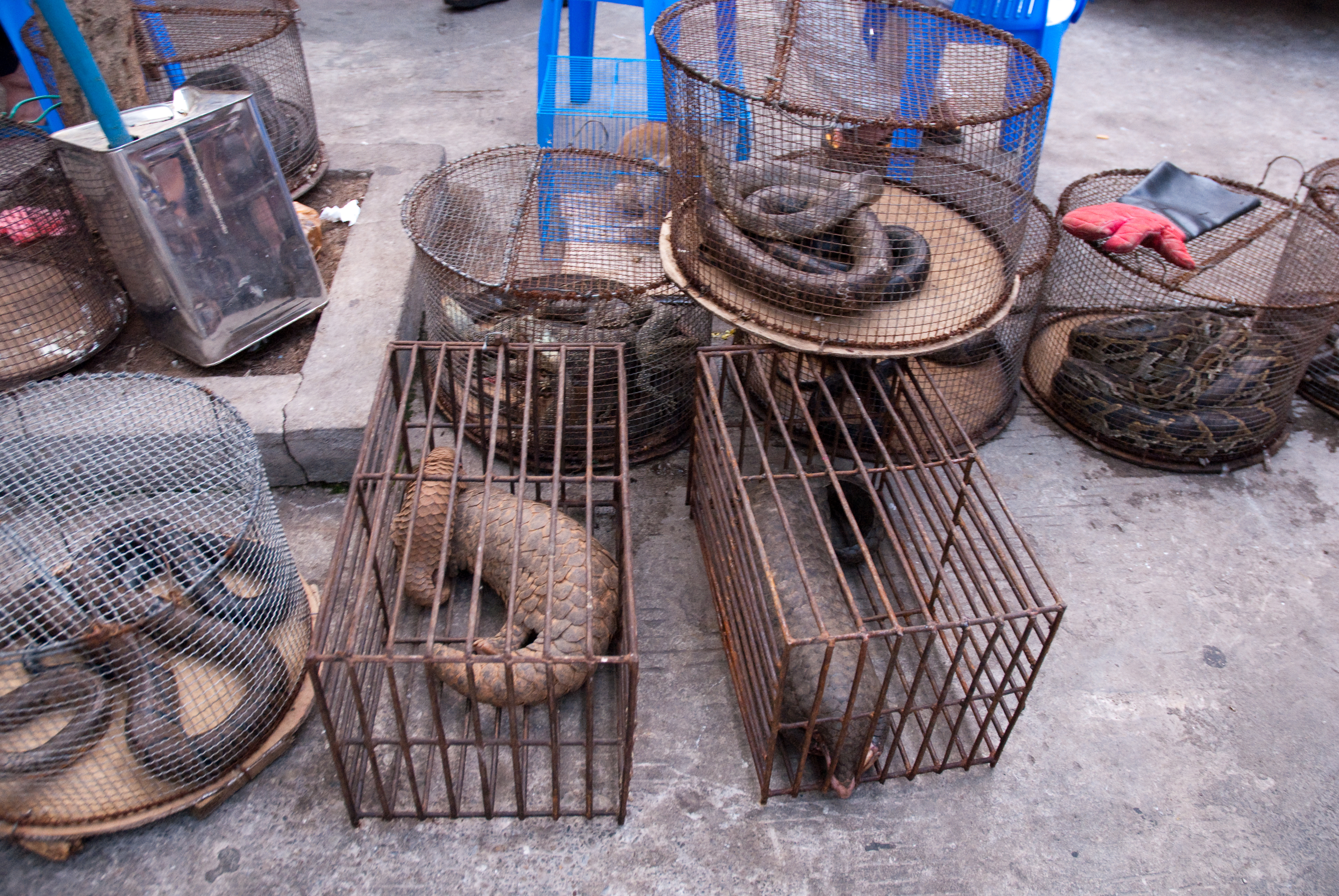
Cages with pangolins and snakes at a wildlife market in Mong La, Myanmar.

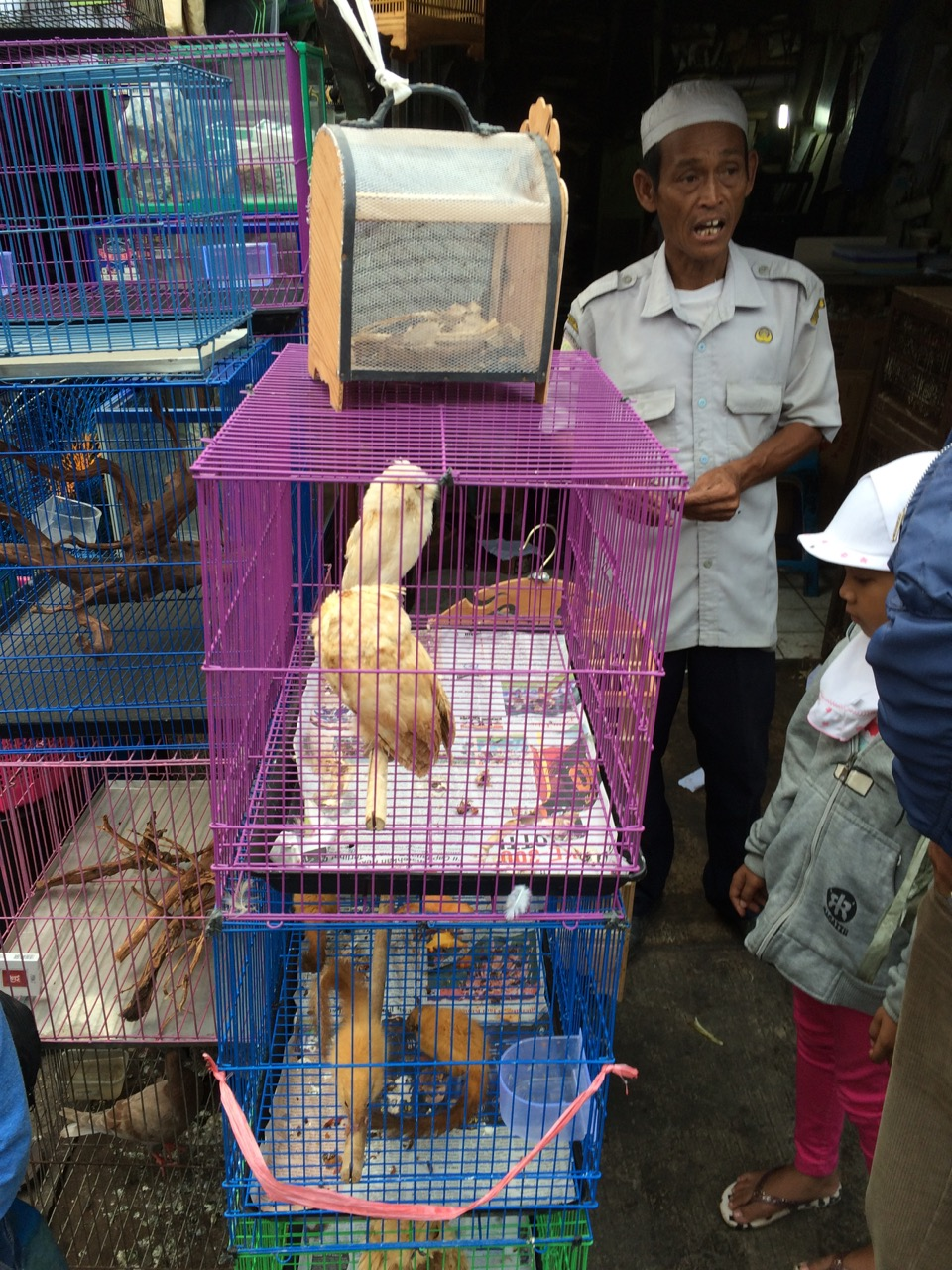
Cages with owls and tree shrews at Jatinegara Market in Jakarta, Indonesia

Unsanitary conditions with different species packed tightly are known to spread disease.

=== Disease control intervention ===
Due to the suspicions that food markets could have played a role in the emergence of COVID-19, a group of US lawmakers, NIAID director Anthony Fauci, UNEP biodiversity chief Elizabeth Maruma Mrema, and CBCGDF secretary general Zhou Jinfeng called in April 2020 for the global closure of wildlife markets due to the potential for zoonotic diseases and risk to endangered species. In April 2021, the World Health Organization called for a total ban on the sale of live animals in food markets in order to prevent future pandemics.

Planetary health studies have called for disease control intervention measures, in lieu of outlawing live-animal markets, to be implemented in markets. These include proposals for "standardised global monitoring of water, sanitation, and hygiene (WASH) conditions", which the World Health Organization announced in April 2020 that it was developing as requirements for markets to open. Other proposals include less homogeneous policies that are specialized for local social, cultural, and financial factors, as well as new proposed rapid assessment tools for monitoring the hygiene and biosecurity of live animal stalls in markets.

=== Media coverage ===
During the first few months of the COVID-19 pandemic in 2020, Chinese food markets were heavily criticized in media outlets as a potential source for the virus. Media reports urging for permanent blanket bans on all such markets, as opposed to solely live animal markets or wildlife markets, have been criticized for undermining infection control needs to be specific about wildlife markets and distracting public attention from local public health threats. Some Western media portrayed food markets without distinguishing between general food markets, live animal markets, and wildlife markets, using montages of explicit images from different markets across Asia without identifying locations. These depictions have been criticized by other journalists and anthropologists as sensationalist, exaggerated, Orientalist, and fueling Sinophobia and "Chinese otherness".

Before 2020, most English speakers had never heard the term "wet market". Some coverage presented it as the local name for the Huanan market; NPR described the market as "known in the region as a 'wet market'". The market's Chinese name, 华南海鲜批发市场, identifies it as a seafood wholesale market; with more than 1,000 stalls across roughly 50,000 square metres, it was the largest seafood wholesale market in central China. Its main goods were crab, shrimp and striped bass, with wildlife sold in a separate section. Critics also argued that the word "wet" itself evokes unhygienic conditions.

== Around the world ==
Such markets exist throughout the world, with the largest concentration in Asia followed by Europe and North America according to touristic social network data in 2019.

=== Africa ===
==== Ethiopia ====
According to a 2013 study on agricultural value chains, approximately 90% of households in Ethiopia across all income groups purchase their beef through local butchers in traditional markets.

==== Kenya ====
The most common agricultural supply chain in Kenya involves farmers selling their produce to collectors who then sell the produce to retailers in fresh food markets. A 2006 study in the areas around Nairobi and Kisumu found that 21% of farmers sold to collectors, 17% sold directly to wholesalers, and 14% sold directly to market vendors. The collectors and wholesalers both predominantly sold their produce inventory to market vendors. The customers of the markets in the study were predominantly end consumers, although a small share of the markets also sold to restaurants.

==== Nigeria ====
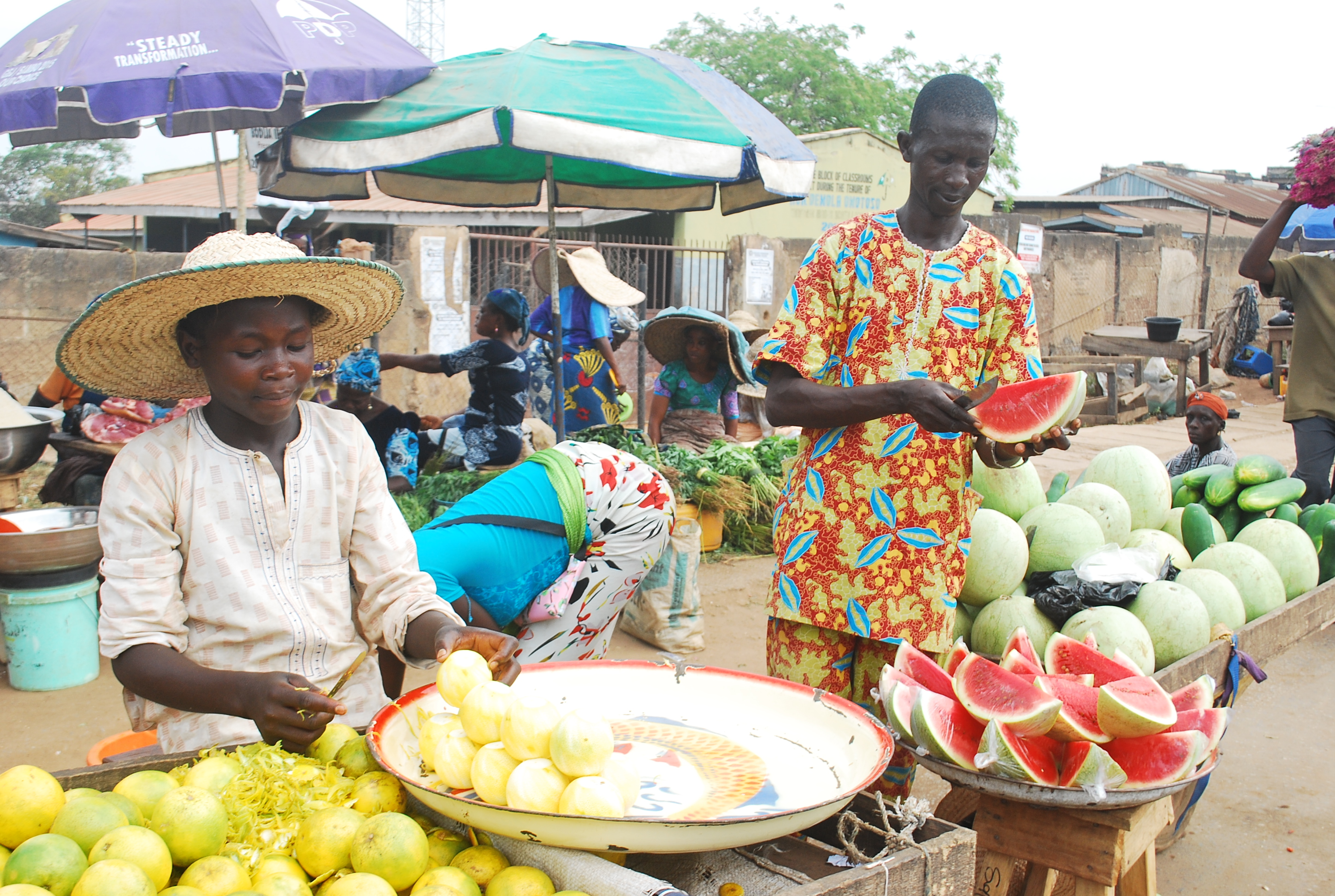
Fruit and vegetable vendors at Bodija Market, Ibadan, Nigeria

According to a 2011 USDA Foreign Agricultural Service report, most of the clientele of traditional open-air markets in Nigeria are low and middle income consumers.

From 2008 to 2009, a group of food safety researchers launched an initiative working with a small group of butchers in the fresh food section of Bodija Market in Ibadan to promote positive food safety practices and peer-to-peer training. The initiative led to 20% more meat samples being of acceptable quality. A follow-up study in 2019 on the same group of butchers found that, while many of the butchers still remembered the food safety practices, "none of the butchers reported that they continued to buy and replace the materials after the exhaustion of those distributed during the intervention programme". The follow-up study found that the microbiological sanitation in 2018 was even worse than before the 2008–2009 intervention.

In 2014, the license of the slaughterhouse in the fresh food section of Bodija Market was revoked due to unhygienic meat handling practices. In its place, the local government opened the Ibadan Central Abattoir in Amosun Village, Akinyele through public-private partnerships. The new facility is equipped with modern facilities for slaughter and processing of meat were provided in 2014 through public-private partnerships and is one of the largest abattoirs in West Africa, consisting of 15 hectares of land with stalls for 1000 meat sellers, 170 shops, administrative building, clinic, canteen, cold room, and an incinerator. In June 2018, local newspapers reported that five people were killed in the Bodija Market abattoir when a security team attempted to enforce the forcible relocation of Ibadan abattoirs to the new facilities as ordered by the local government.

==== Uganda ====
The most common agricultural supply chain in Uganda involves farmers selling their produce to wholesalers, who in turn sell to retailers in fresh food markets. A 2006 study in the areas around Kampala and Mbale found that 51% of farmers sold to wholesalers and 18% sold directly to market vendors, while 34% of the wholesalers sold to market vendors. The customers of the markets in the study were predominantly end consumers, although a small share of the markets also sold to restaurants.

=== Americas ===
==== Brazil ====
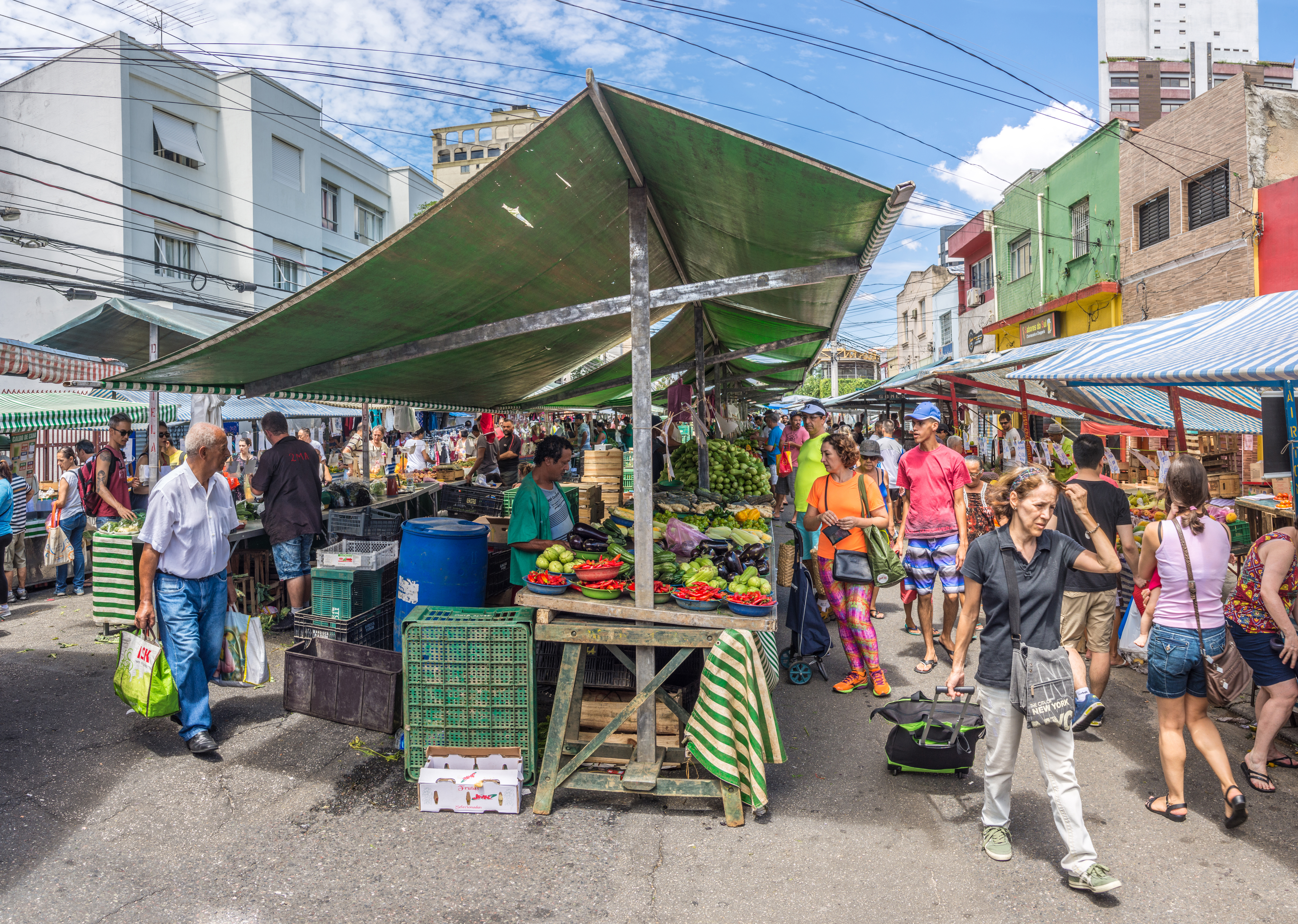
Saúde street market, São Paulo, Brazil

In Brazil, regulations on traditional markets are handled at the municipal level. The regulations widely vary across Brazil, with zoning rules prohibiting such markets in some municipalities.

A 2003 study found that traditional markets were losing ground in food retail to supermarkets, which had an overall food retail market share of 75%. The gains of supermarkets over traditional food retailers in Brazil were predominantly in meat and seafood retail, with the supermarkets' fresh meat & seafood market shares typically three times greater than their fresh fruits & vegetables market share.

==== Colombia ====
According to a 2010 USDA Foreign Agricultural Service report, each small town in Colombia typically has a fresh food market that is supplied by local production and opens at least once a week. The report described both retail and wholesale markets that provide food products for "Mom'n Pop stores". It estimated the number of such markets at around 2,000, but noted that the number was slowly decreasing in large cities despite the presence of large markets like Corabastos in Bogotá.

==== Greenland ====
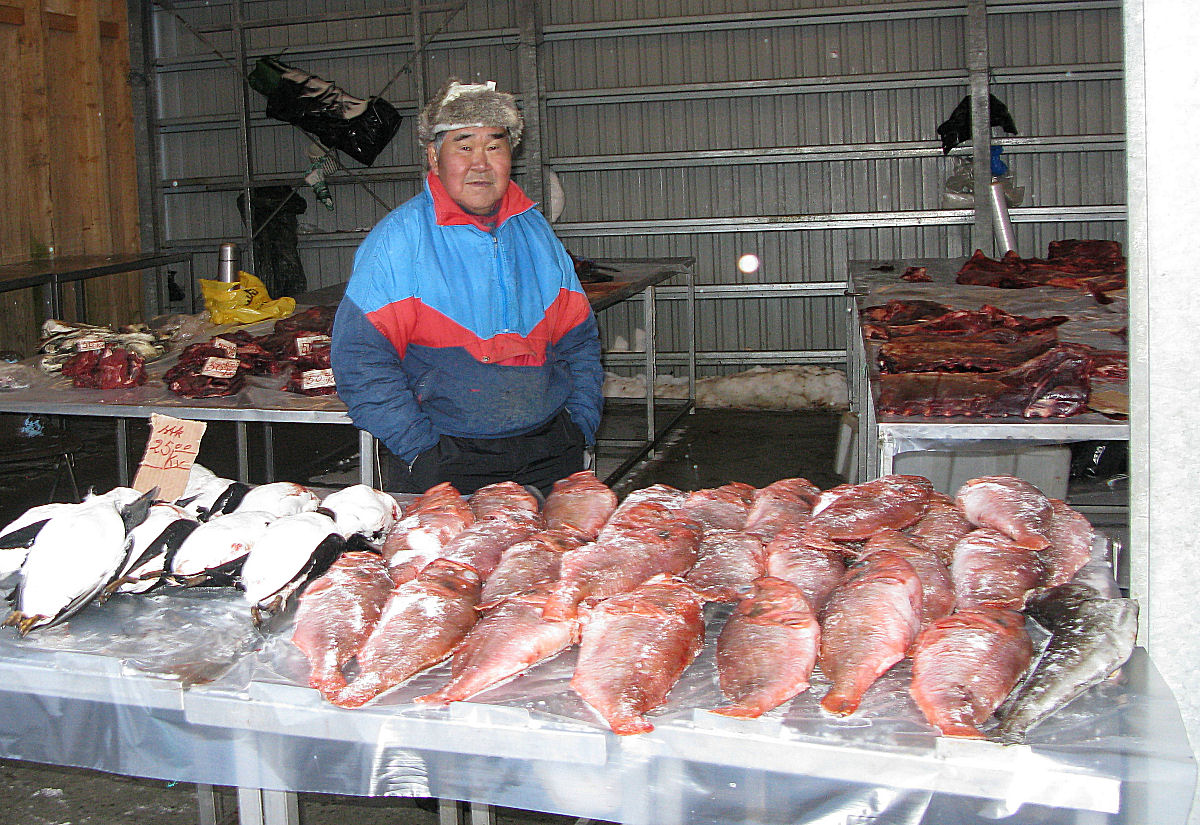
A seafood stall at the Kalaaliaraq Market

In Greenland, local markets known as brætter sell food from wild animals, including seal meat, whale meat, reindeer meat, and polar bear meat. Brætter do not sell live animals, but most meat sold in brætter is fresh and recently butchered. While larger towns have purpose-built facilities, the brætter in smaller towns and village settlements sell seafood in open-air stands without running water or electricity. Only fresh meat was allowed to be sold in Nuuk at Kalaaliaraq Market, the largest fresh food market in Greenland, until 2018 when the government of Greenland began permitting the sale of dried and salted meat at Kalaaliaraq.

Trichinosis is a common problem in Greenland due to the consumption of wild polar bear meat. In 2016, several people were infected with Trichinella roundworms from eating polar bear meat from a local brætter even though the meat had initially passed inspections. As of 2017, Trichinella inspections for seal and polar bear meat sold at brætter is not mandatory.

==== Mexico ====
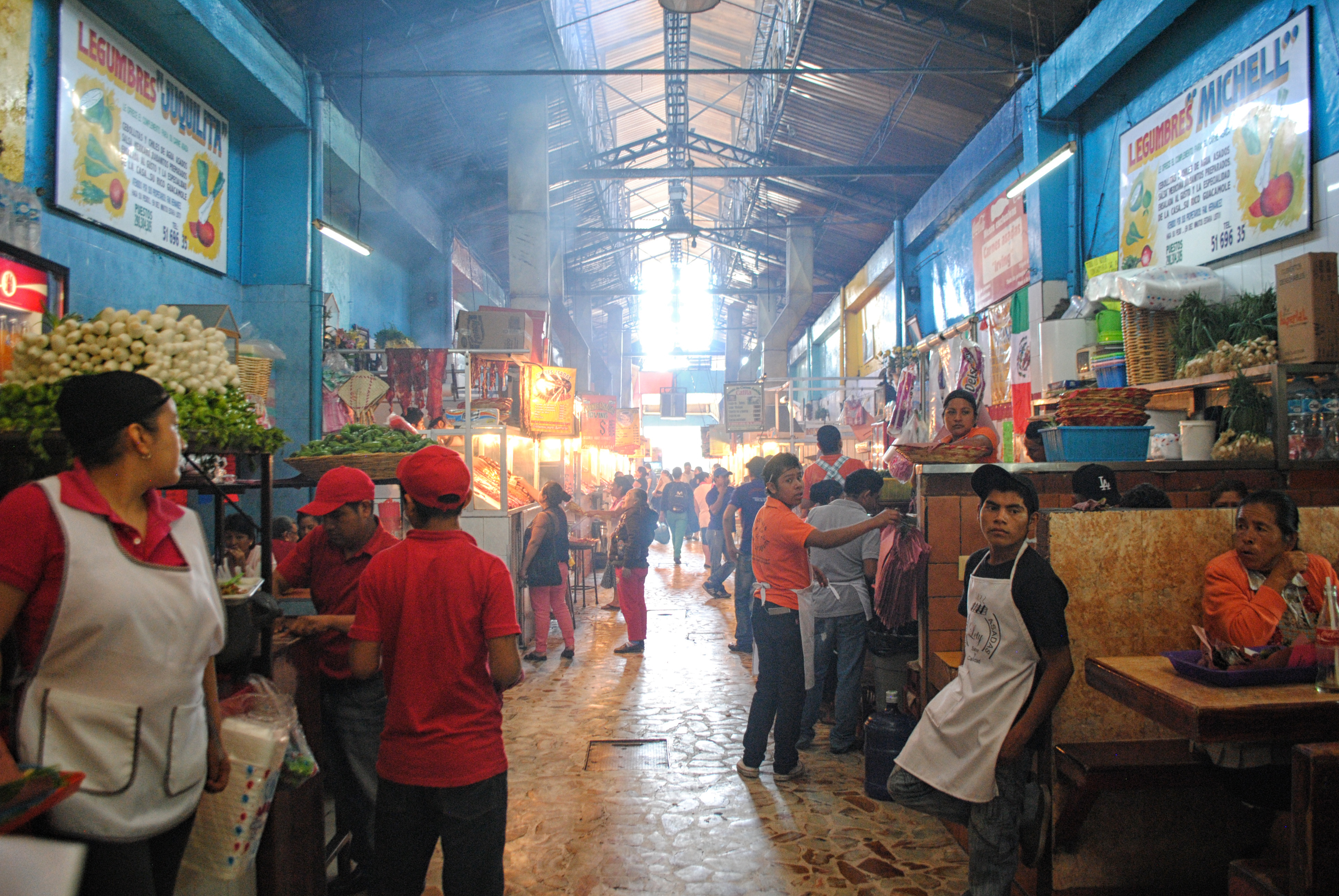
Fresh meat section of the Mercado 20 de Noviembre in Oaxaca, Mexico

Some traditional Mexican open-air markets called tianguis, such as the Mercado Margarita Maza de Juárez in Oaxaca, are separated into a fresh food section (zona húmeda) and a dry goods section (zona seca). A 2002 study observed a trend that Mexican consumers, especially those in the middle class, increasingly prefer supermarkets for beef purchases as opposed to traditional markets. In 2014, a study of Mexican beef retail also noted an ongoing transition from traditional full-service markets to self-service meat display cases in supermarkets.

In Mexico, conflicts between traditional and modern retailers are handled at the municipal and state levels. Some local zoning rules, such as those in the central districts of Mexico City and Morelia, have prohibited traditional markets from operating in urban districts without providing further assistance to the retailers.

==== United States ====
In April 2020, The Hill reported that markets selling live animals were still operating in the United States and that animal rights activists were calling for the closure of such markets, in addition to their existing calls to close factory farms.

Fresh food markets were common in New York City until refrigeration became commonplace in the 20th century. From the 1990s to 2020, the number of live animal markets in New York City nearly doubled. As of 2020, there are more than 80 markets in New York City that stock live animals and slaughter them on-demand for customers. They are mostly poultry markets located in outer-borough immigrant communities where they are culturally significant and pose low public health risks relative to wildlife markets and other types of exotic markets.

=== Asia ===
==== China ====
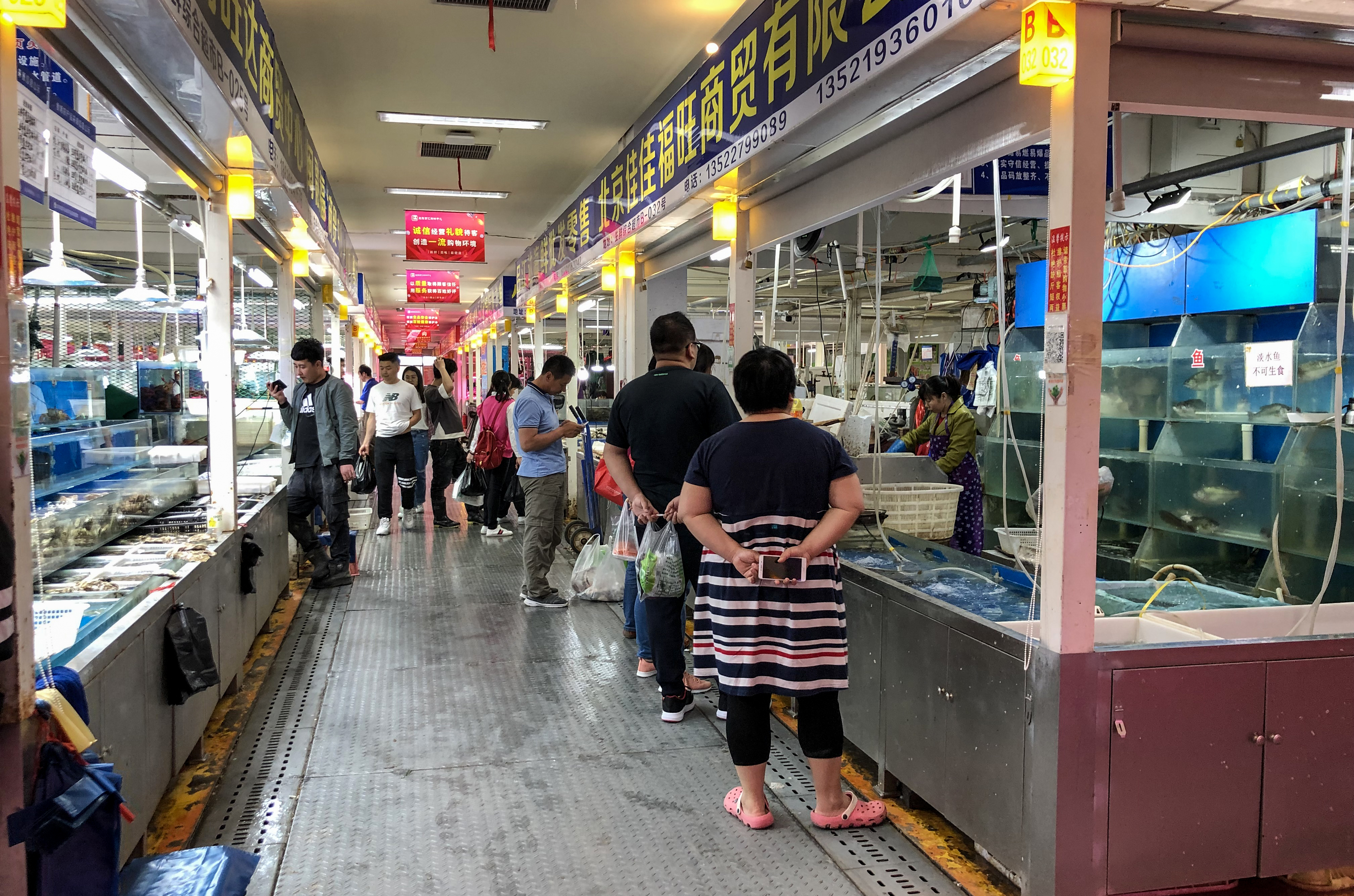
Seafood section of Sanqi Baihui Market in Beijing, China

Since the 1990s, large cities across China have moved traditional outdoor markets to modern indoor facilities. As of 2018, fresh food markets remained the most prevalent food outlet in urban regions of China despite the rise of supermarket chains since the 1990s. During the 2010s, "smart markets" equipped with e-payment terminals emerged as traditional markets faced increasing competition from discount stores. Such markets also began facing competition from online grocery stores, such as Alibaba's Hema stores.

The trade of wildlife is not common in China, particularly in large cities, and most food markets in China do not contain live or wild animals besides fish held in tanks. In the early 1980s, small-scale wildlife farming began under the reform and opening up. It began to expand nationwide with government support in the 1990s, but was largely concentrated in the southeastern provinces. In 2003, markets across China were banned from holding wildlife after the 2002–2004 SARS outbreak, which was directly tied to such practices. Some poorly regulated Chinese markets provided outlets for the wildlife trade industry after the ban, although the illegal wildlife trade in China was predominantly in fur rather than in food or medicine. The Huanan Seafood Wholesale Market in Wuhan was linked to the origin of COVID-19 due to its early cluster of cases, leading to further restrictions and enforcement in 2020. In April 2020, the Chinese government unveiled plans to further tighten restrictions on wildlife trade.

===== Hong Kong =====
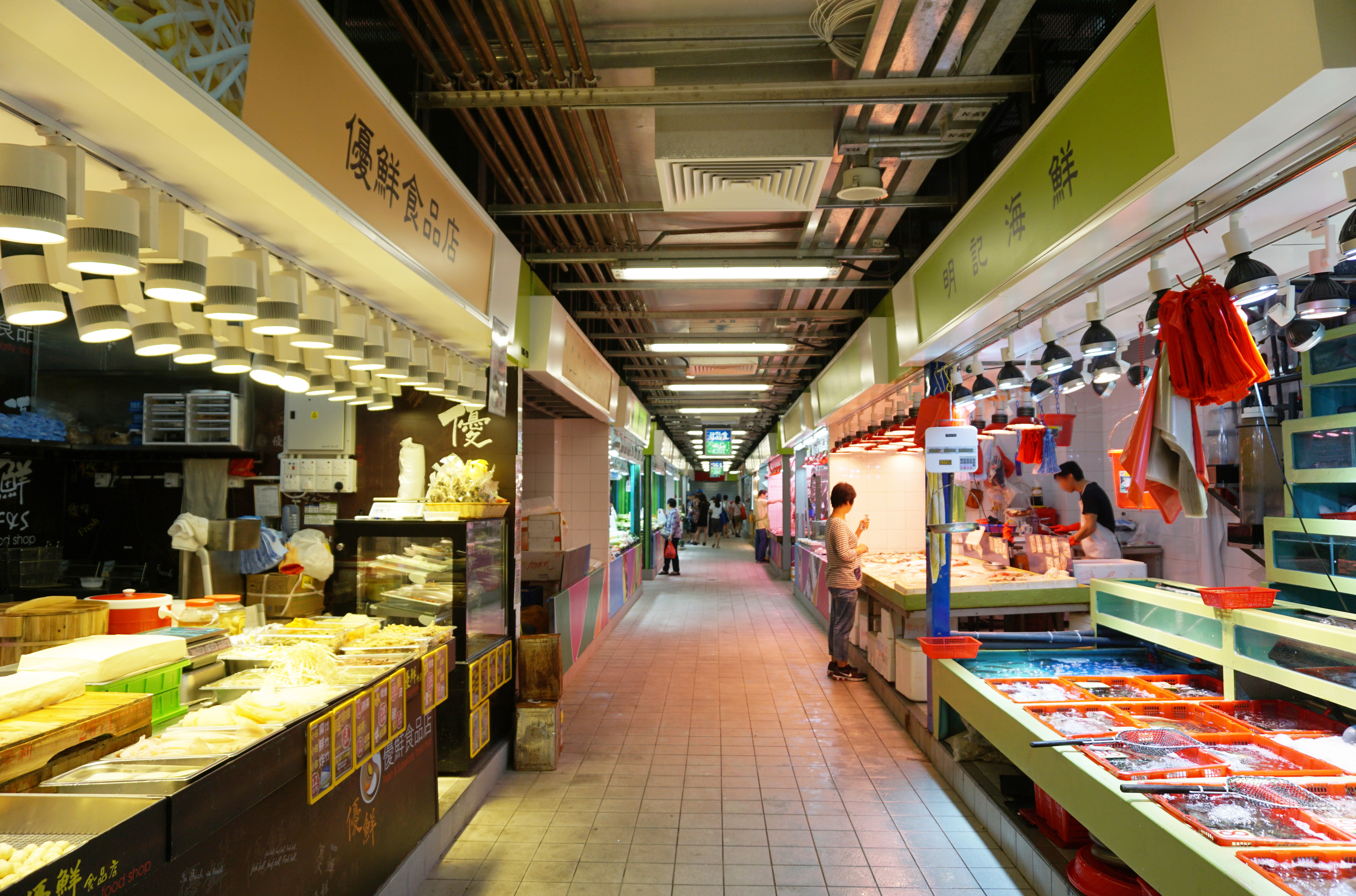
Shui Chuen O Market, a newer market under the ownership of the Hong Kong Housing Authority

Large centralised markets have existed in Hong Kong since at least 16 May 1842, when Central Market was opened. These markets are most frequented by older residents, those with lower incomes, and domestic helpers who serve approximately 10 percent of Hong Kong's residents. Most neighbourhoods contain at least one such market. They have become destinations for tourists to "see the real Hong Kong".

Prior to 2000, many of Hong Kong's public markets were managed by the Urban Council (within Hong Kong Island and Kowloon) or the Regional Council (in the New Territories). Since 2000, Hong Kong's public markets have been regulated by the Food and Environmental Hygiene Department. Under the Slaughterhouse Regulation, the slaughtering of live bovine animals, swine, goats, sheep or soliped for human consumption must take place in a licensed slaughterhouse, None of the markets in Hong Kong hold wild or exotic animals.

In 2018, the FEHD operated 74 markets housing approximately 13,070 stalls. In addition, the Hong Kong Housing Authority operated 21 markets while private developers operated about 99 (in 2017).

==== India ====
The Indian meat, poultry, and seafood industries are largely dependent on traditional markets. According to Food & Beverage News, domestic consumers prefer freshly cut meat from traditional markets over processed and frozen meats despite use of outdated and unhygienic facilities by the majority of Indian market abattoirs.

In Delhi, the food retail system consists of the traditional informal food retail sector (traditional markets, pushcarts, and kirana "mom-and-pop" stores), rent-free-subsidized retailers' cooperatives, government-owned food distribution channels, and private modern supermarkets. Delhi's traditional markets generally consist of a number of small retailers that cluster together to sell their produce during daily fixed hours. A 2010 study of Delhi food retail found that 68% to 75% of the total quantity of fruits and vegetables sold to consumers were distributed by market retailers. The same study surveyed consumers at 518 market retailers in Delhi and found that their transactions included relatively little bargaining, with only a 3% average difference between the final price and the initially quoted price.

==== Indonesia ====
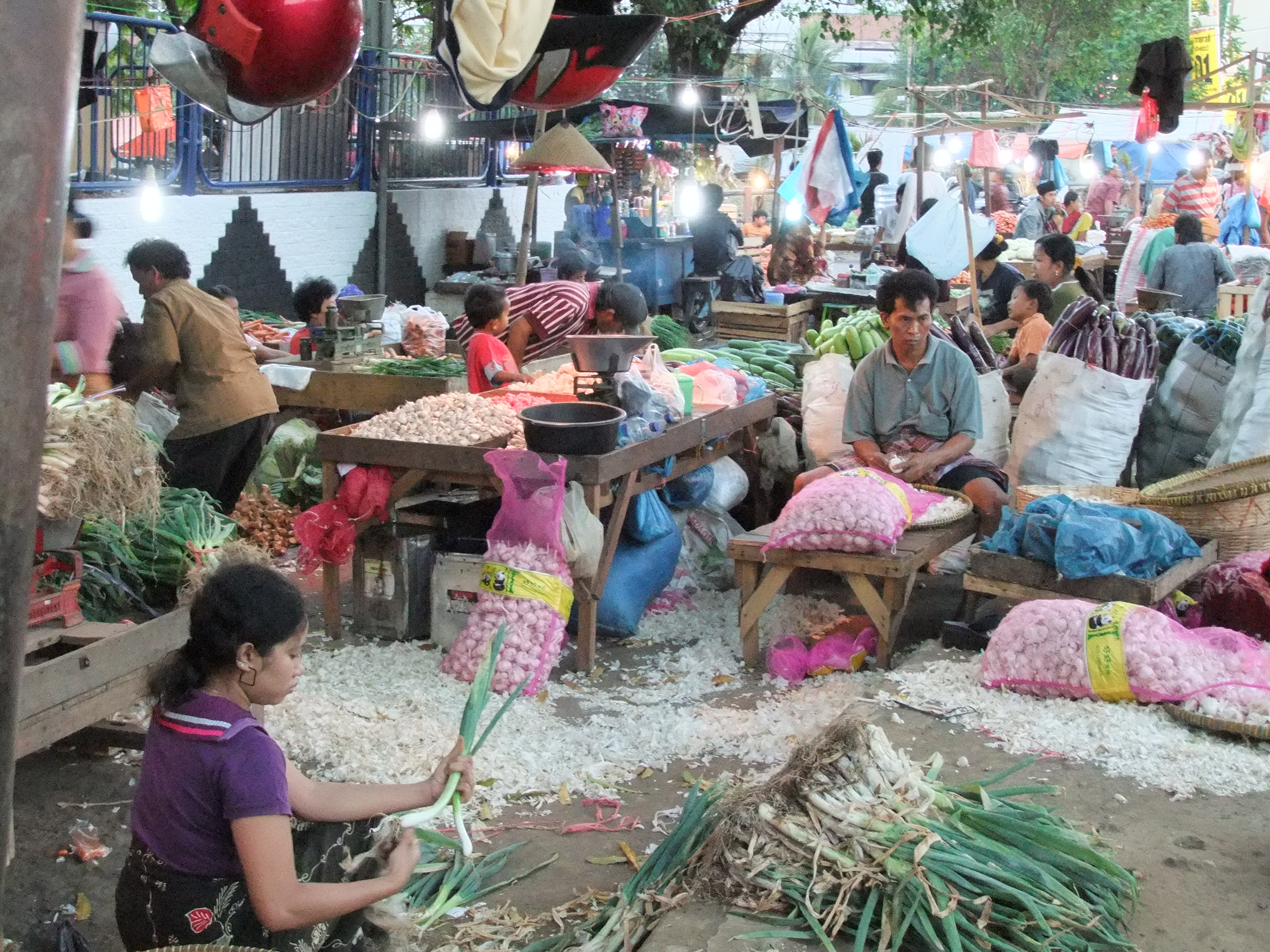
Pasar Keputran, a pasar pagi in Surabaya, Indonesia.

Traditional markets, called pasars (including pasar malam and pasar pagi), are found across in Indonesia in both urban and rural areas. They face increasing competition from supermarkets as well as e-commerce companies like Shopee and Tokopedia. As of 2020, there are 12.3 million traders across 13,450 traditional markets in Indonesia.

In 2016, the Indonesia government's policy to stabilise beef prices required importers to sell cheaper-priced meats in traditional markets instead of in supermarkets and hypermarkets. In Greater Jakarta, Indian buffalo meat is predominantly sold in traditional markets, with limited market penetration from supermarkets and hypermarkets as of 2018. In contrast, only 7% of consumers in Jakarta purchase Australian beef from supermarkets in 2018. In 2018, Indonesian market vendors that import goods expressed concerns over the decrease in value of the Indonesian rupiah.

Traditional markets throughout Indonesia have undergone major renovations in the 2010s under a government program. In 2018, the first modernised traditional market opened in Jakarta with a laboratory as well as freezing and refrigeration facilities. Through June 2020, health protocols and mobility restrictions from the COVID-19 pandemic in Indonesia resulted in a 65% reduction in revenue for market traders, according to the Traditional Market Traders Association (IKAPPI). In mid-2020, traditional markets in several provinces accounted for several major clusters of COVID-19 cases. An Airlangga University survey from May to June 2020 found that people in East Java markets followed health protocols, including social distancing and mask-wearing, the least relative to other public places in East Java.

==== Malaysia ====
In March 2020, the Malaysian government temporarily banned the operation of all traditional markets (including pasar malam and pasar pagi) as a national response to the coronavirus pandemic.

==== Philippines ====
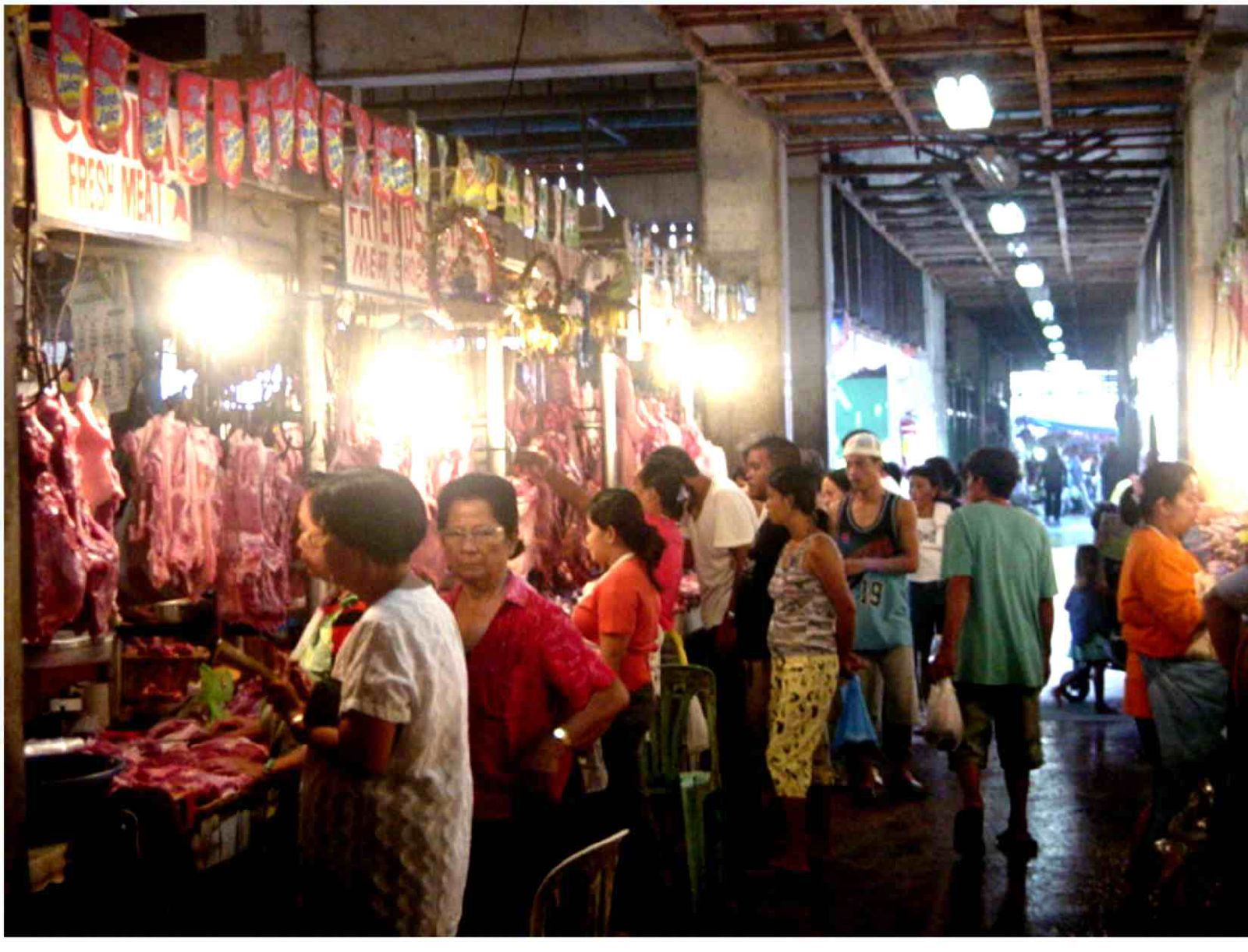
A palengke in Danao, Cebu, Philippines

In the Philippines, public markets are managed by cooperatives according to legislation such as the Cooperatives Code (RA 7160) and the Agriculture and Fisheries Modernization Act (RA 8435). The Philippine government has control over the price of some commodities sold in palengkes, especially critical foods such as rice.

In July 2017, the digital market Palengke Boy was launched in Davao City to compete against traditional markets. In March 2020, the Pasig local government launched a mobile market to ensure access to basic goods during the COVID-19 pandemic.

==== Singapore ====
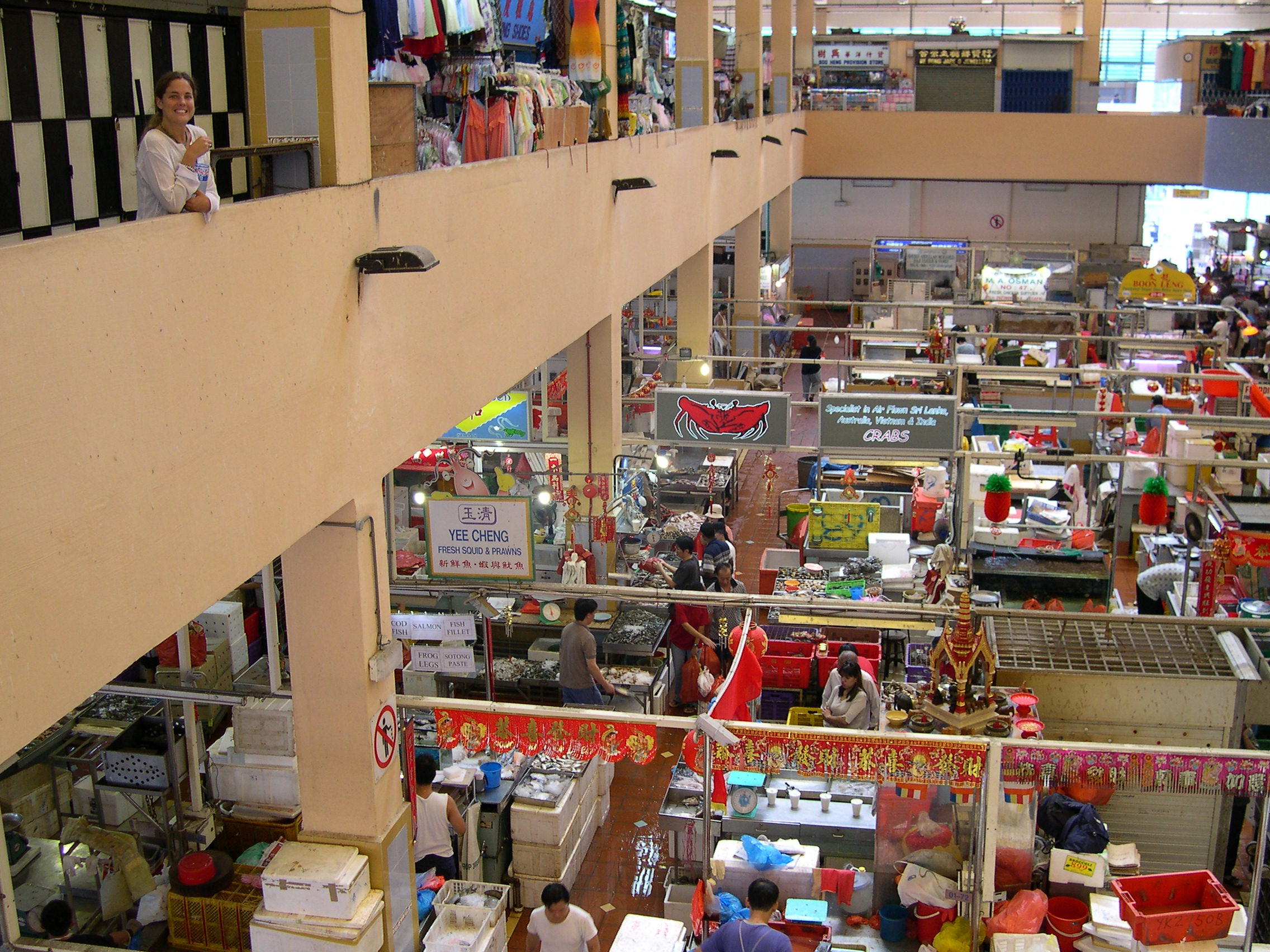
Stalls at Tekka Market, Singapore

Traditional markets in Singapore are subsidized by the government. The Tekka Market, Tiong Bahru Market, and Chinatown Complex Market are prominent markets containing seasonal fruit, fresh vegetables, imported beef, and live seafood.

In the early 1990s, the slaughter of animals was banned in 12 inner-city markets and 22 market centers in Singapore. In early 2020, the National Environment Agency issued advisories for "high standards of hygiene and cleanliness" for the 83 markets that it oversees in a response to the 2020 coronavirus pandemic.

==== Sri Lanka ====
In Sri Lanka, where poultry is the leading livestock industry and constitutes the only meat export industry, the majority of broiler chickens are mechanically processed in semi-automated plants. However, poultry is still slaughtered in traditional markets that generally cater to specific groups of customers and ethnic groups. A 2017 study of 102 semi-automated poultry processing plants and 25 poultry-slaughtering markets found that 27.4% of the broiler neck skin samples from the semi-automated processing facilities tested positive for Campylobacter contamination, while 48% of broiler neck skin samples from the market processing facilities tested positive for Campylobacter contamination.

==== Taiwan ====
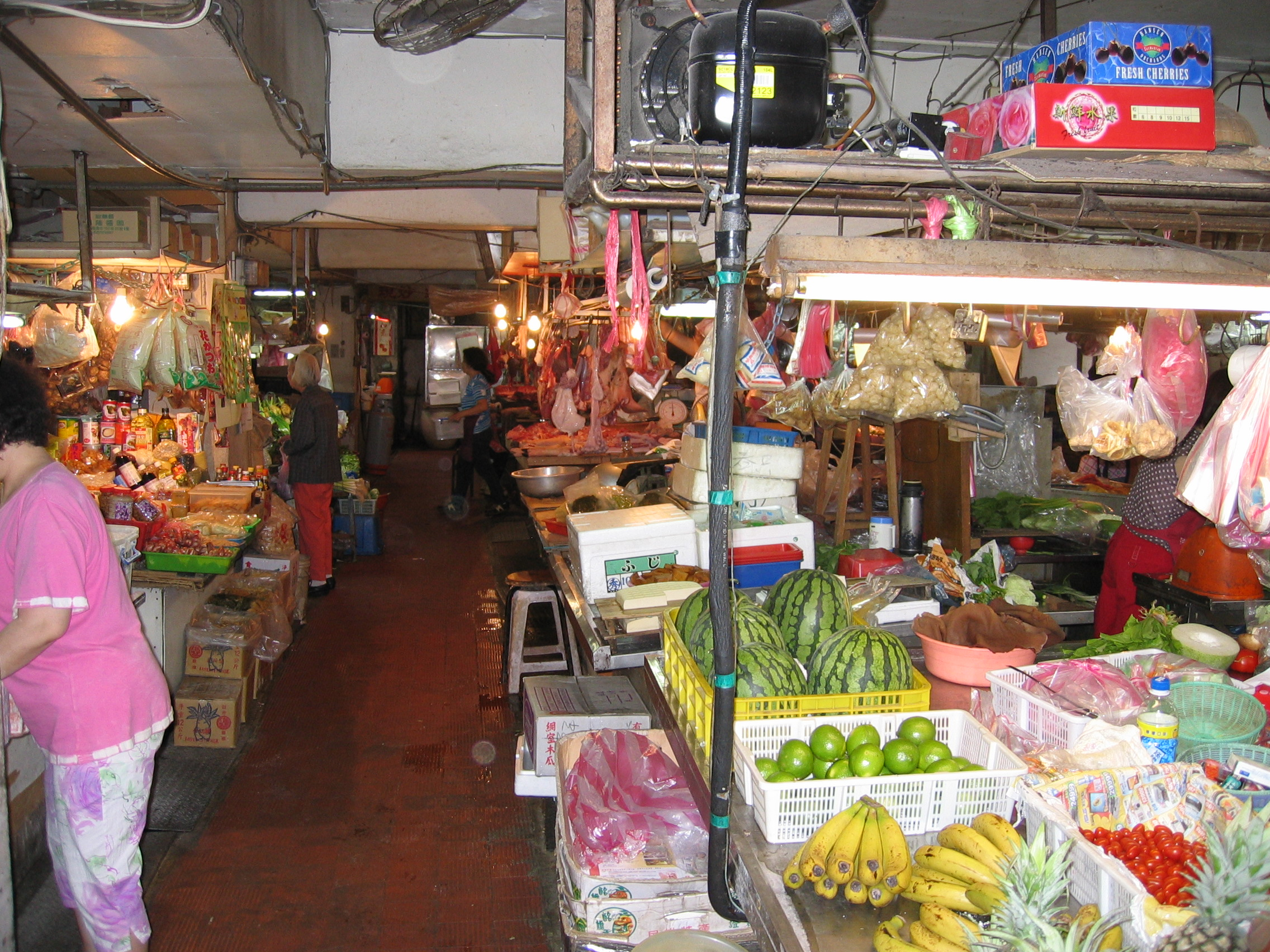
A traditional Chinese market in Daan District, Taipei, Taiwan

Many traditional markets in Taiwan originated as groups of peddlers and roadside stalls that organized into informal physical structures. By 2020, these markets had been in decline throughout Taiwan for decades and revitalization efforts have been largely unsuccessful.

In 1997, a report by the Taipei city government indicated that the city had 61 major traditional markets with almost 10,000 registered vendors. The report also indicated that most of the city's markets were in serious need of repair and that almost 3,500 of the vendor stalls lay vacant. The Nanmen Market in Taipei is a government-owned traditional market that was opened in 1907 during the Japanese colonial rule. The market building was demolished in October 2019 and the market temporarily relocated until its replacement modern 12-floor building is completed in 2022.

One of the largest traditional markets in Taiwan, the Jianguo Market in Taichung, was torn down and replaced by a new facility in 2016. The new facilities provided better hygiene, disability accessibility, and refrigeration, but the relocation was initially met with hesitation from the local vendors before a grassroots outreach campaign led to greater acceptance.

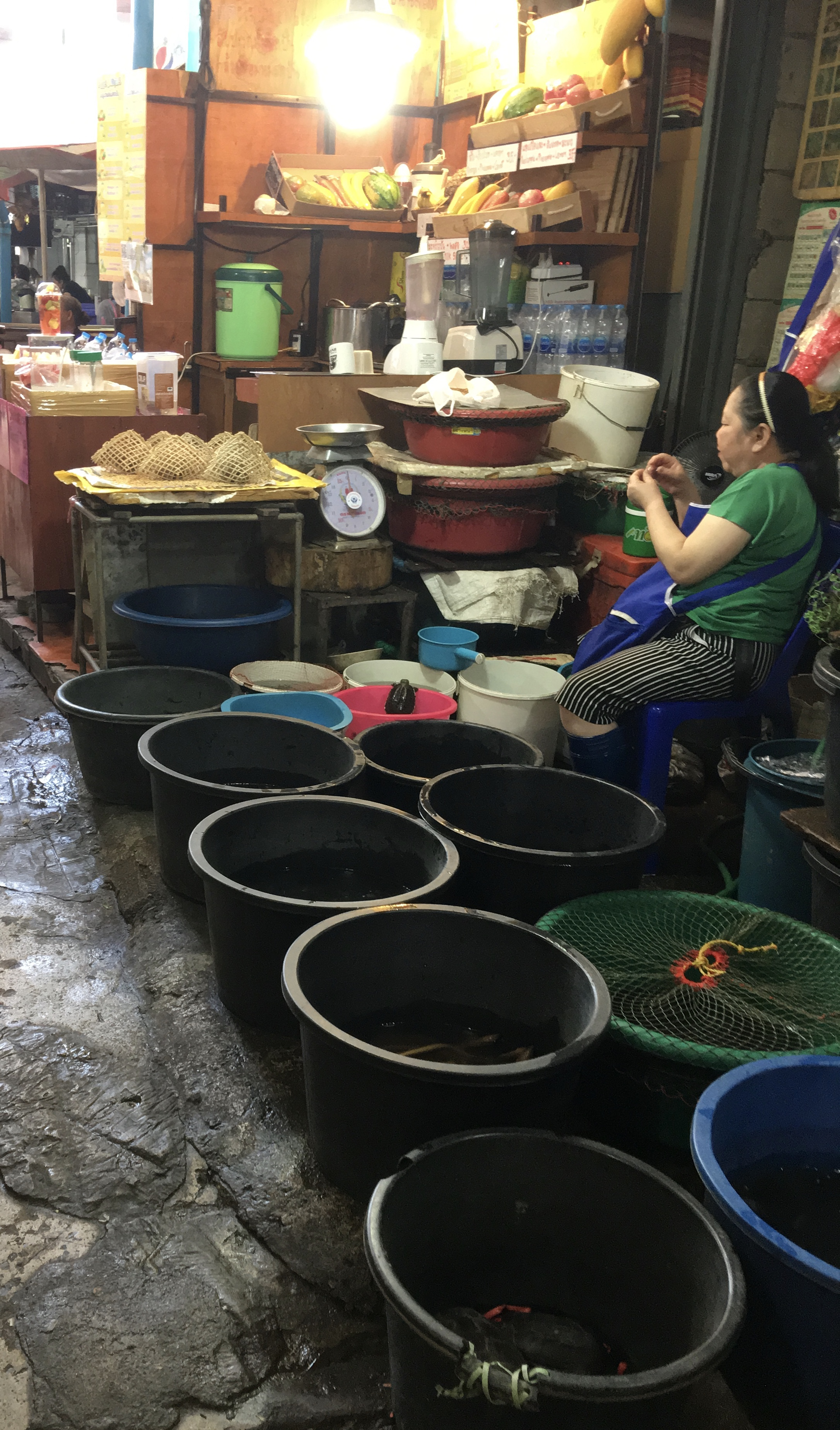
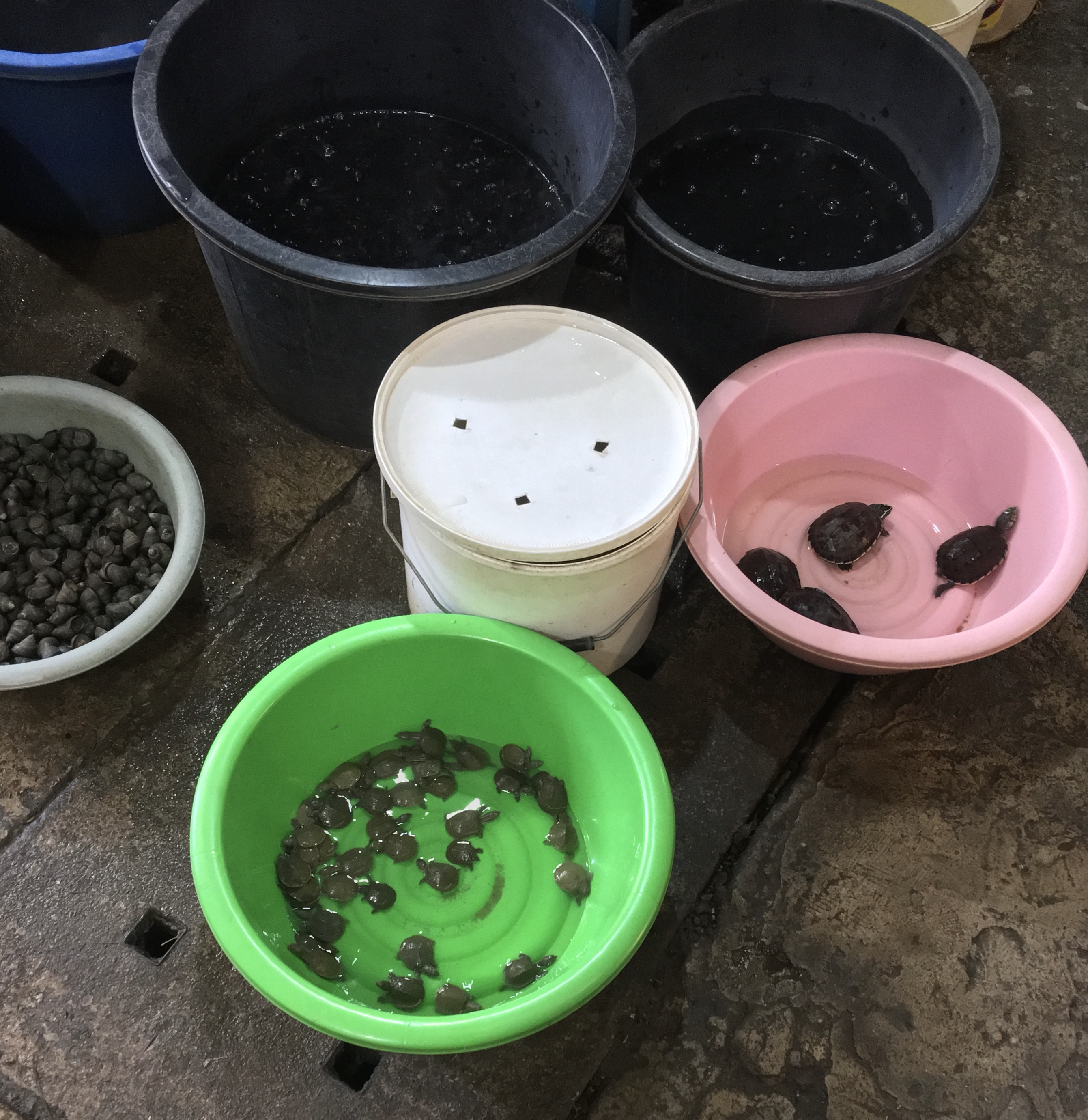
A market in Chinatown, Chiang Mai, Thailand, selling a variety of shellfish and turtles.

==== Thailand ====
Traditional markets are the dominant preferred venue for grocery shopping in Thailand due to the local preference for fresh food, as well as lower prices and familiarity with shopkeepers.

==== United Arab Emirates ====
In October 2018, a Meat & Livestock Australia report said that while the United Arab Emirates's grocery retail sector is highly developed, traditional markets are still prominent throughout the country.

==== Vietnam ====
In 2017, there were approximately 9,000 traditional markets, 800 supermarkets, 160 shopping malls and 1.3 million small family-owned stores across Vietnam according to government estimates.

In 2017, the Hanoi city government planned to renovate the city's traditional markets and transform them into modern shopping malls. The plan was met with resistance from market vendors after significant declines in sales figures from other markets that were moved to the basements of high-end shopping centers.

In 2020, Prime Minister of Vietnam Nguyễn Xuân Phúc announced proposals to ban wildlife trade in Vietnam.

=== Europe ===
==== France ====
Rungis International Market in the Île-de-France region, created in 1969, is the largest market for fresh food in the whole of Europe, selling food from both within and without Île-de-France. The largest wholesale food market in the world, and perhaps even the largest fresh food market, various foods are offered, including sheep and eel. By 1972, 6000 tonnes of fruits and vegetables were shipped to the market daily.

==== Italy ====
The Porta Palazzo Market in the northwestern city of Turin is the largest street market in Europe, having about a hundred fresh food producers sell their goods at the height of the season in the city's historic district. The Turinese authorities, working alongside those of the market, have increasingly attempted to reconfigure the public's perception of the market as a multicultural space and a site for tourism, featuring cuisine from around the world.

==== Ireland ====
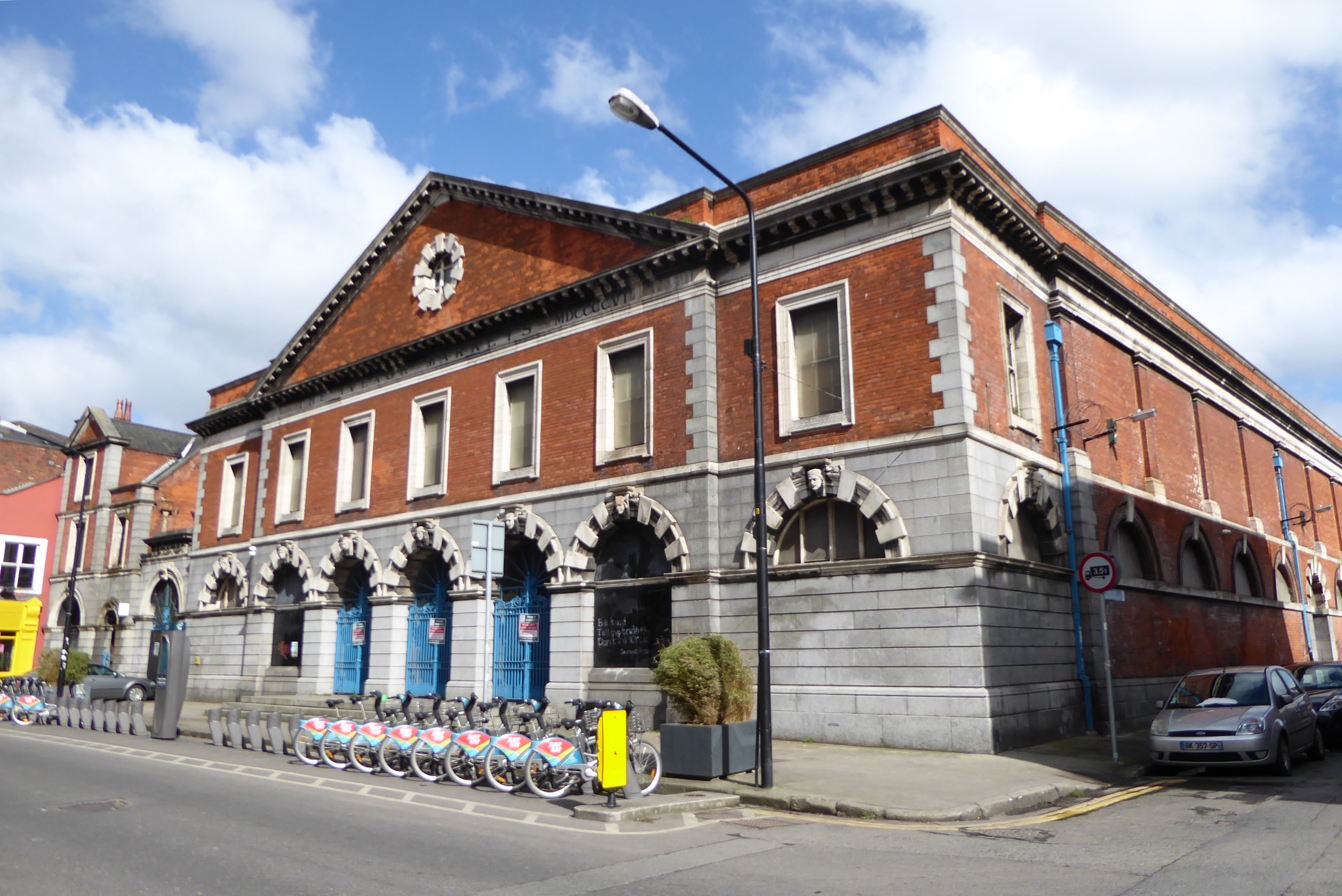
An entrance to the Edwardian Iveagh Markets building in Dublin, Ireland.

The Iveagh Markets in Dublin, Ireland was an indoor market that was divided into a dry market that sold clothes and a food market that sold fish, fruit, and vegetables. The market operated from 1906 and had become dilapidated by the 1980s. The last stalls closed in the 1990s and the building is still derelict as of 2018 despite failed attempts to redevelop the site into a new food market complex.

=== Oceania ===
==== Australia ====
In 2020, SBS reported that such markets were once common in Australia and were gradually shut down over time as abattoirs were centralised and moved away from cities. Media outlets Daily Mercury and Herald Sun, as well as Agriculture Minister David Littleproud and Leader of the Labor Party Anthony Albanese, have described various fresh meat, seafood, and produce markets in Australia, such as the Sydney Fish Market and Melbourne Fish Market, as wet markets in response to international calls to ban wet markets.

== See also ==
- Animal–industrial complex
- Bazaar
- Pasar malam
- Meat market
- Night market
- Street market
- Ye wei (southern China)
