= P. K. T. Natarajaan =

Member-Tamil Nadu Legislative Assembly
- In office 2001–2006
- Preceded by: I. Periyasamy
- Succeeded by: I. Periyasamy
- Constituency: Athoor

Personal details
- Born: 6 June 1953 Ayyampalayam
- Party: All India Anna Dravida Munnetra Kazhagam
- Profession: Agriculturist

P. K. T. Natarajan is an Indian politician and a former Member of the Legislative Assembly (MLA) of Tamil Nadu. He hails from the village of Ayyampalayam in the Dindigul district. Representing the All India Anna Dravida Munnetra Kazhagam (AIADMK) party, he successfully contested the 2001 Tamil Nadu Legislative Assembly election from the Athoor Assembly constituency and became an MLA.

== Electoral performance ==
Election	Constituency	Political party	Result	Vote %	Opposition			Ref
Election	Constituency	Political party	Result	Vote %	Candidate	Political party	Vote %	Ref
2001	Athoor	AIADMK	Won	49.13%	I. Periyasamy	DMK	46.36%	
