= Tiruppathur Assembly constituency =

Tiruppathur Assembly constituency may refer to:

- Tiruppattur, Sivaganga Assembly constituency
- Tiruppattur, Vellore Assembly constituency
