= I. Periyasamy =

Indian politician (born 1953)

Cabinet Minister Government of Tamil Nadu
- In office 14 December 2022 – 5 May 2026
- Minister: Minister of Rural Development and Panchayats
- Governor: R. N. Ravi
- Chief Minister: M. K. Stalin
- Preceded by: K. R. Periyakaruppan
- In office 7 May 2021 – 14 December 2022
- Minister: Minister for Co-operatives
- Governor: R. N. Revi
- Chief Minister: M. K. Stalin
- In office 13 May 2006 – 15 May 2011
- Minister: Minister for Revenue and Housing
- Governor: Surjit Singh Barnala
- Chief Minister: M. Karunanidhi
- In office 13 May 1996 – 13 May 2001
- Minister: Minister for Small Industries and Noon Meal
- Governor: Marri Channa Reddy (until December 1996); Krishan Kant (1996-1997); Fathima Beevi (1997-2001)
- Chief Minister: M. Karunanidhi

Member of Tamil Nadu Legislative Assembly
- Incumbent
- Assumed office 11 May 2006
- Preceded by: P. K. T. Natarajaan
- Constituency: Athoor
- In office 10 May 1996 – 14 May 2001
- Preceded by: S. M. Durai
- Succeeded by: P. K. T. Natarajaan
- Constituency: Athoor
- In office 6 February 1989 – 30 January 1991
- Preceded by: V. R. Nedunchezhiyan
- Succeeded by: S. M. Durai
- Constituency: Athoor

Deputy General Secretary of DMK
- Incumbent
- Assumed office 9 January 2015
- Preceded by: Durai Murugan

Personal details
- Born: 6 January 1953 (age 73) Batlagundu, Dindigul, Tamil Nadu, India
- Party: Dravida Munnetra Kazhagam
- Children: I. P. Senthilkumar (son)
- Parent: Irulappan (father)

Irulappan Periyasamy is an Indian politician serving as the Rural Development Minister of Tamil Nadu. He was the minister for Co-Operation from 2021 to 2022; Revenue and Housing under the DMK government from 2006 to 2011. He was born in Batlagundu on 6 January 1953. His son I. P. Senthil Kumar is an MLA of Palani constituency in Tamil nadu.

== Elections contested and results ==
=== Tamil Nadu Legislative Assembly ===
Elections	Constituency	Party	Result	Vote %	Opposition candidate	Opposition party	Opposition vote %
1989	Athoor	DMK	Won	32.22	N. Abdul Kadhar	INC	29.01
1991	Athoor	DMK	Lost	29.81	S. M. Durai	AIADMK	68.74
1996	Athoor	DMK	Won	64.09	C. Chinnamuthu	AIADMK	24.92
2001	Athoor	DMK	Lost	46.36	P. K. T. Natarajaan	AIADMK	49.13
2006	Athoor	DMK	Won	53.20	C. Sreenivasan	AIADMK	34.68
2011	Athoor	DMK	Won	59.58	S. Balasubramani	DMDK	31.08
2016	Athoor	DMK	Won	53.10	Natham R. Viswanathan	AIADMK	41.26
2021	Athoor	DMK	Won	72.11	Thilagabama M.	PMK	13.15
2026	Athoor	DMK	Won	44.79	N. Kalaiselvi	TVK	35.36

== Political career ==
- 1986-1991 Chairman, Batlagundu Union
- 1989-1991 member of Tamil Nadu legislative assembly
- 1996-2001 Minister for small industries and noon meal in Tamil Nadu government
- From 2006 to 2011, Minister for Revenue and Housing in Tamil Nadu government.
- Elected in 2011 Legislative Assembly election From Athoor. 2011-2016 Member, Tamil Nadu Legislative Assembly in opposition party
- Elected in 2016 Legislative Assembly election From Athoor.
- From 2016 Member, Tamil Nadu Legislative Assembly
- From 2021 Minister of Co-operation, Government of Tamil Nadu.

== Ministerial positions ==
Periyasamy has held several key ministerial positions in the Tamil Nadu government:

As Minister for Small Industries and Noon Meal from 1996 to 2001, he oversaw initiatives to promote small-scale industries and strengthen the state's Midday Meal Program for school children.

During his tenure as Minister for Revenue and Housing from 2006 to 2011, he played a significant role in modernizing the state's land revenue administration system and implementing housing projects for economically disadvantaged sections of society.

He served as Minister for Co-operatives from 2021 to 2022, where he focused on implementing policies to enhance the performance and outreach of cooperative societies across the state.

Since 2022, he has held the position of Minister of Rural Development and Panchayats, overseeing rural infrastructure development initiatives and village-level empowerment programs.
