= Srinivasa Sethupathi =

Indian politician

Srinivasa Sethupathi is an Indian politician from the state of Tamil Nadu. He is a member of the Tamil Nadu Legislative Assembly representing the sivaganga(Tiruppattur)Assembly constituency as a candidate of the Tamilaga Vettri Kazhagam (TVK) party.

== Early life ==
Srinivasa Sethupathi is approximately 38 years old. He hails from Sivaganga district in Tamil Nadu. Professionally, he is founder of Kochadaiyan hospital and Happtrend media Karaikudi

== Political career ==
Srinivasa Sethupathi contested in the 2026 Tamil Nadu Legislative Assembly election from the Tiruppattur Assembly constituency as a candidate of the Tamilaga Vettri Kazhagam party, founded by actor Vijay.

In this election, he achieved a sensational victory against senior Dravida Munnetra Kazhagam (DMK) leader and minister K. R. Periyakaruppan. Periyakaruppan had been winning from this constituency consecutively since 2006.

Sethupathi received 83,375 votes, while Periyakaruppan secured 83,374 votes. The result marked an exceptionally narrow victory, with a margin of just one vote.
