= Bodija Market =

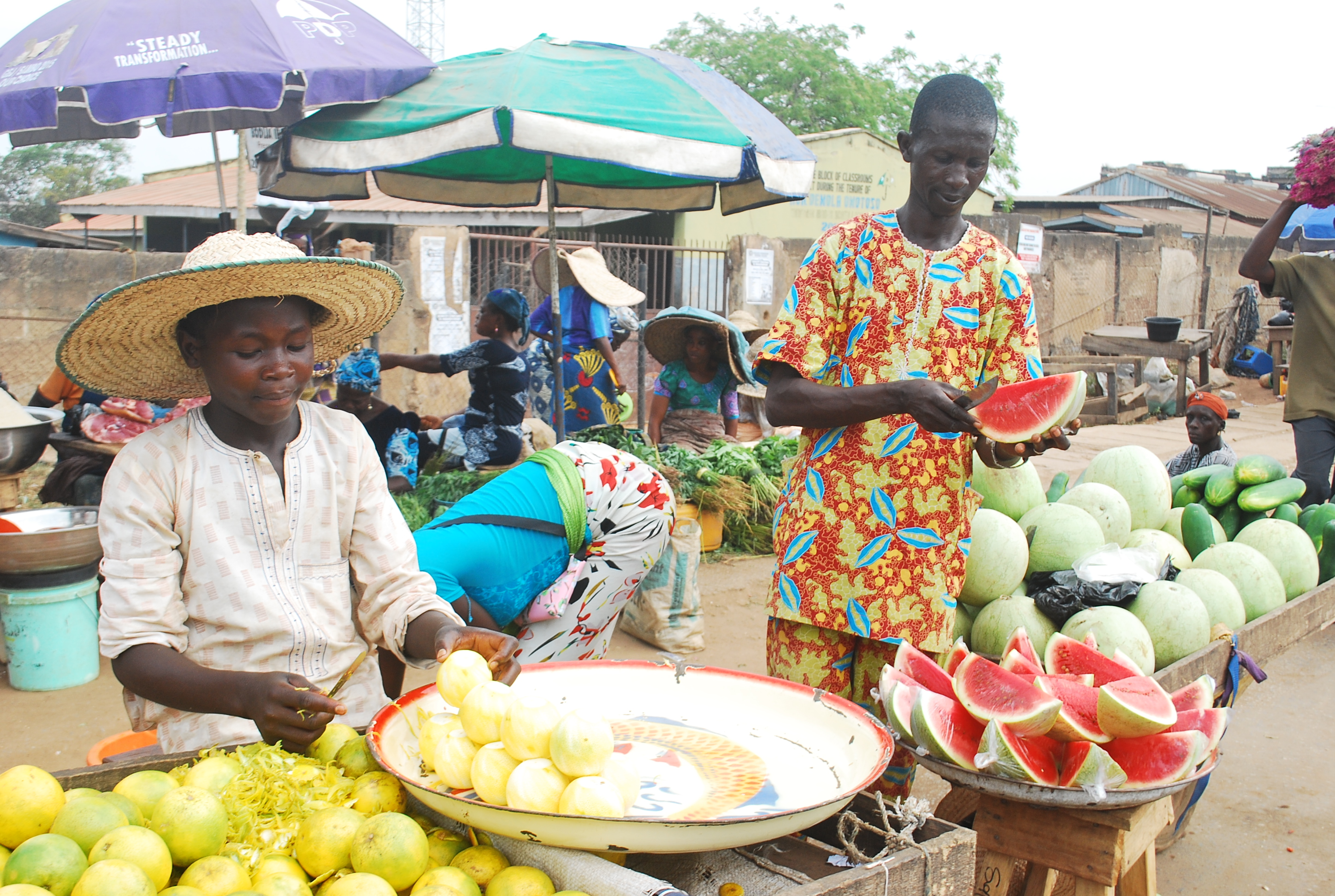
Fruit vendors at the Bodija Market

Bodija Market is a popular open-air market located in Bodija, Ibadan North, Oyo State, South Western Nigeria.

== History ==
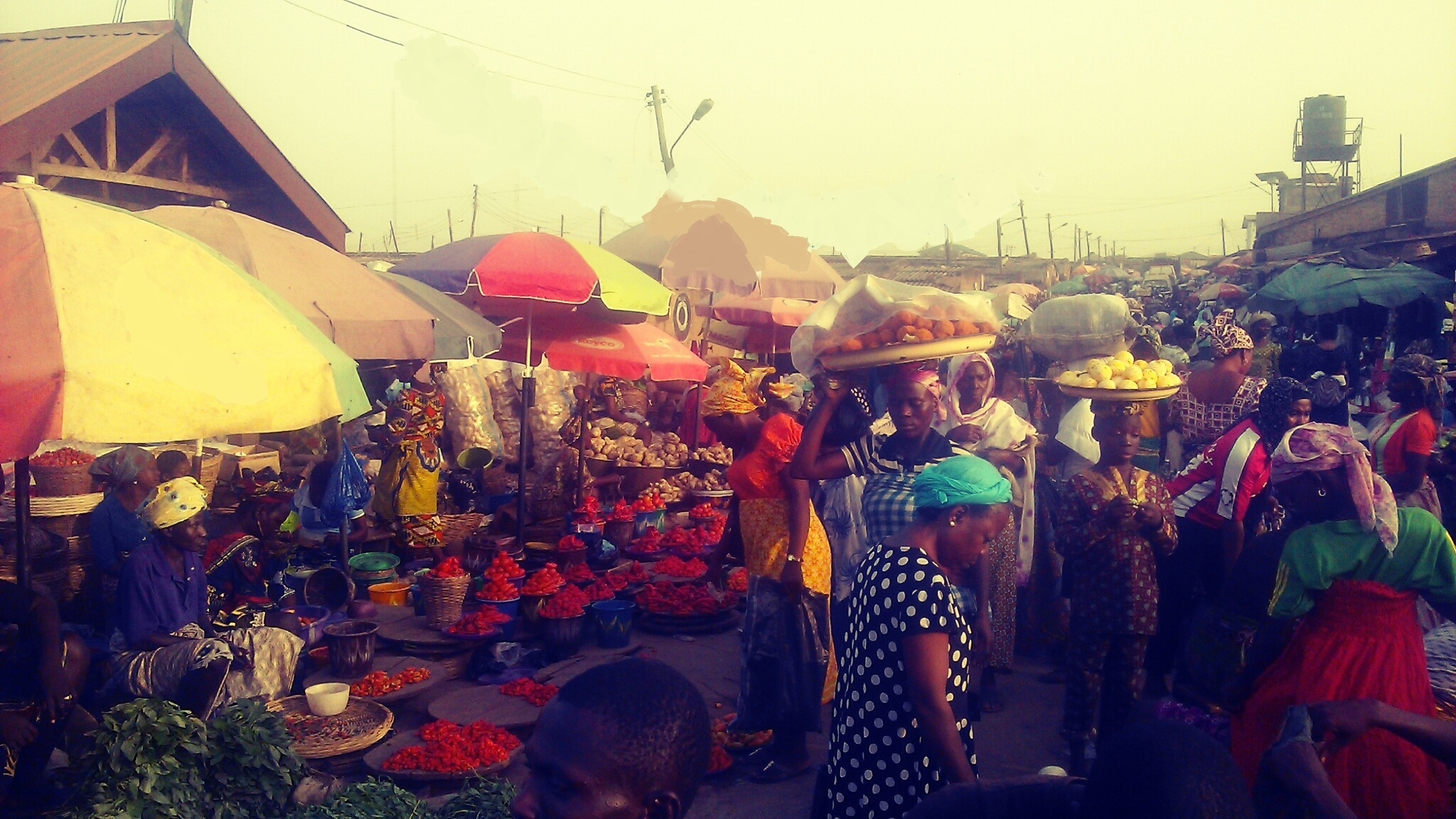
Vegetable vendors at the Bodija Market

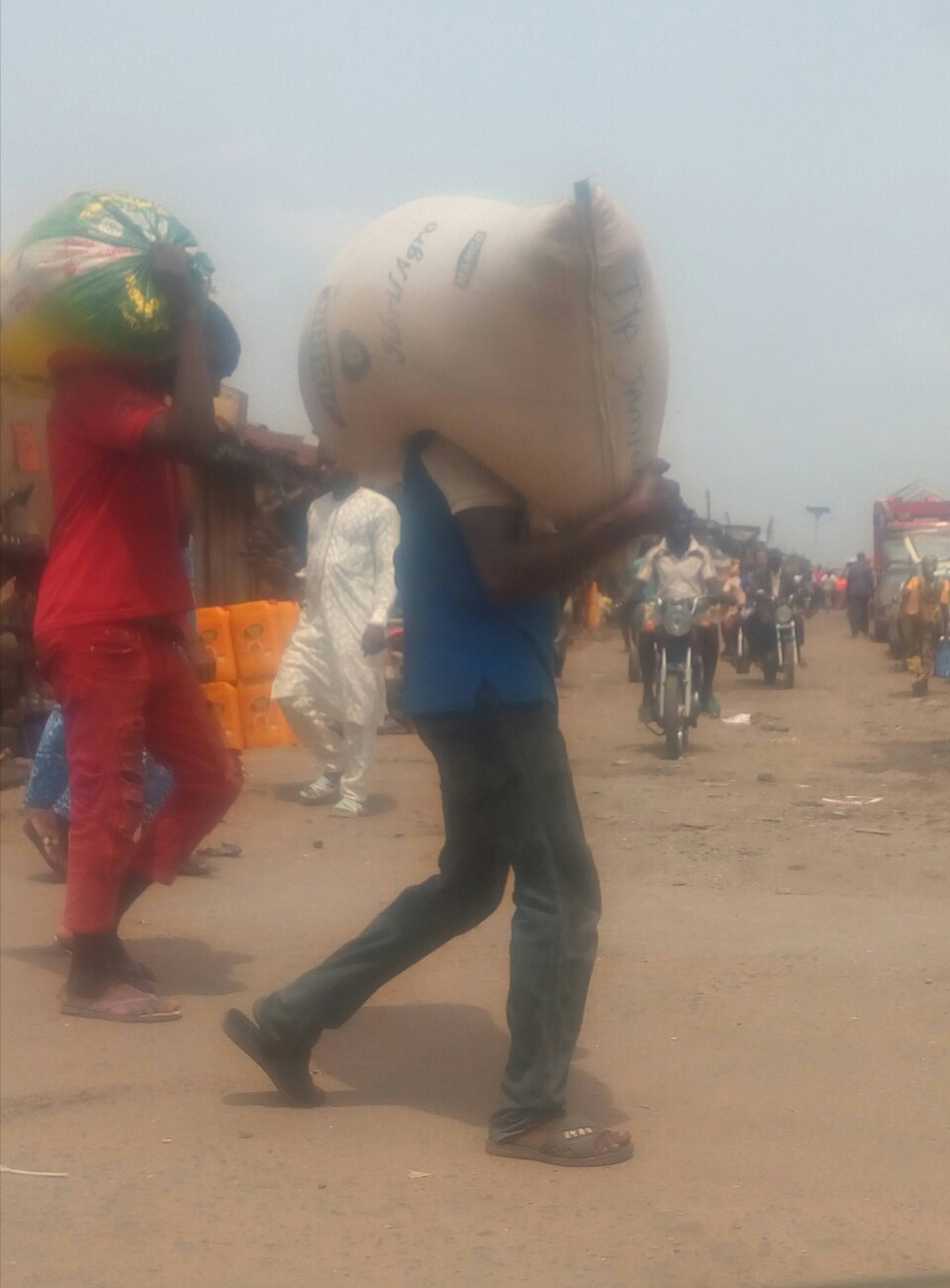
Men working at the Bodija Market

The market was originally a fighting arena, which is reflected in its name.

The market was established in October 1987. Its establishment came as a result of growth and overcrowding at the Orita Merin foodstuff market in Ibadan. The Oyo State government under the military administration of Tunji Olurin then relocated many food stuff traders from Orita Merin to the new Bodija market in 1987. Along with the produce traders, cattle sellers from Sango, Ibadan were also relocated to the market. The location of the market is close to the Oyo-Ogbomoso-Ilorin interstate road network. This allows produce farmers from Northern Nigeria and from Northern Oyo state easier access to transport their produce to the market. Also, a timber market exist in close proximity to Bodija. The design of the market is such that each produce such as pepper, beans, potatoes, rice and yam has its own rows of stalls. The market is a mixture of open space trading and concrete and wooden stalls. A lot of wholesalers gravitate towards ownership of the concrete stalls while retailers own most of the open space kiosks and trading locations.

In 2014, the license of the slaughterhouse in the Bodija Market was revoked due to unhygienic meat handling practices. In its place, the local government opened the Ibadan Central Abattoir in Amosun Village, Akinyele through public-private partnerships. The new facility is equipped with modern facilities for slaughter and processing of meat were provided in 2014 through public-private partnerships and is one of the largest abattoirs in West Africa, consisting of 15 hectares of land with stalls for 1000 meat sellers, 170 shops, administrative building, clinic, canteen, cold room, and an incinerator. In June 2018, local newspapers reported that five people were killed in the Bodija Market abattoir when a security team attempted to enforce the forcible relocation of Ibadan abattoirs to the new facilities as ordered by the local government.

== Inter-ethnic clashes ==
In 2013, The Sun reported several inter-ethnic conflict between the Hausa and Yoruba traders in the market.

== Abattoir sanitation ==
From 2008 to 2009, a group of food safety researchers launched an initiative working with a small group of butchers in the wet market section of Bodija Market to promote positive food safety practices and peer-to-peer training. The initiative led to 20% more meat samples being of acceptable quality. A follow-up study in 2019 on the same group of butchers found that, while many of the butchers still remembered the food safety practices, "none of the butchers reported that they continued to buy and replace the materials after the exhaustion of those distributed during the intervention programme". The follow-up study found that the microbiological sanitation in 2018 was even worse than before the 2008–2009 intervention.
