= Tiruppattur, Sivaganga Assembly constituency =

One of the 234 State Legislative Assembly Constituencies in Tamil Nadu, in India

Coordinates: 10.11°N 78.60°E

Tiruppattur
- Constituency No. 185 for the Tamil Nadu Legislative Assembly

Constituency details
- Country: India
- Region: South India
- State: Tamil Nadu
- District: Sivaganga
- Lok Sabha constituency: Sivaganga
- Established: 1951
- Total electors: 2,75,999
- Reservation: None

Member of Legislative Assembly
- 17th Tamil Nadu Legislative Assembly
- Incumbent Seenivasa Sethupathy.R
- Party: TVK
- Elected year: 2026

Tirupattur (194) is a state assembly constituency in Sivaganga district in Tamil Nadu. It is one of the 234 State Legislative Assembly Constituencies in Tamil Nadu, in India. Elections and winners in the constituency are listed below. Elections were not held in year 1957 and 1962. Most successful party: DMK (eight times).

== Members of Legislative Assembly ==
=== Madras State ===
Year	Winner	Party
1952	Muthiah Chettiar	Independent
1967	S. Madhavan	Dravida Munnetra Kazhagam

=== Tamil Nadu ===
Year	Winner	Party
1971	S. Madhavan	Dravida Munnetra Kazhagam
1977	S. Shanmugam Koothakudi	Communist Party of India
1980	V. Valmigi	Indian National Congress (I)
1984	S. Madhavan	All India Anna Dravida Munnetra Kazhagam
1989	S. S. Thennarasu	Dravida Munnetra Kazhagam
1991	S. Kannappan	All India Anna Dravida Munnetra Kazhagam
1996	R. Sivaraman	Dravida Munnetra Kazhagam
2001	K. K. Umadhevan	All India Anna Dravida Munnetra Kazhagam
2006	K. R. Periyakaruppan	Dravida Munnetra Kazhagam
2011	K. R. Periyakaruppan	Dravida Munnetra Kazhagam
2016	K. R. Periyakaruppan	Dravida Munnetra Kazhagam
2021	K. R. Periyakaruppan	Dravida Munnetra Kazhagam
2026	R. Srinivasa Sethupathi	Tamilaga Vettri Kazhagam

== Election results ==
Vote share of winning candidates
2026	38.65%
2021	49.39%
2016	55.72%
2011	48.25%
2006	44.85%
2001	38.69%
1996	47.56%
1991	56.77%
1989	29.47%
1984	53.93%
1980	43.94%
1977	29.66%
1971	70.13%
1967	61.38%
1952	56.50%

=== 2026 ===
2026 Tamil Nadu Legislative Assembly election: Tiruppattur (Sivaganga)
Party	Candidate	Votes	%	±%
TVK	Srinivasa Sethupathi	83,375	38.65	New
DMK	K. R. Periyakaruppan	83,374	38.65	▼10.74
BJP	K. C. Thirumaran	29,054	13.45	
Independent	K. P. M. Raja	753	0.35	New
NOTA	NOTA	747	0.35	
Margin of victory		1	0.00	▼17.80
Turnout		2,15,711	78.16	▲6.19
Registered electors		2,75,999		
TVK gain from DMK		Swing	▲38.65	

=== 2021 ===
2021 Tamil Nadu Legislative Assembly election: Tirupattur (Sivaganga)
Party	Candidate	Votes	%	±%
DMK	K. R. Periyakaruppan	103,682	49.39	−6.33
AIADMK	Marudhu Alaguraj	66,308	31.59	−3.00
Independent	C. Paramasivam	13,202	6.29	New
AMMK	K. K. Umadhevan	7,448	3.55	New
Margin of victory		37,374	17.80	−3.34
Turnout		209,913	71.97	−2.14
Rejected ballots		481	0.23	
Registered electors		291,677		
DMK hold		Swing	-6.33	

=== 2016 ===
2016 Tamil Nadu Legislative Assembly election: Tirupattur (Sivaganga)
Party	Candidate	Votes	%	±%
DMK	K. R. Periyakaruppan	110,719	55.72	+7.47
AIADMK	K. R. Asokan	68,715	34.58	−12.75
CPI	N. Sathiah	7,380	3.71	New
NOTA	NOTA	1,939	0.98	New
Independent	M. Muthusamy	1,443	0.73	New
IJK	I. Antony Lawrance	1,128	0.57	New
Independent	K. R. Periyakaruppan	1,040	0.52	New
Margin of victory		42,004	21.14	20.22
Turnout		198,690	74.10	−5.10
Registered electors		268,126		
DMK hold		Swing	7.47	

=== 2011 ===
2011 Tamil Nadu Legislative Assembly election: Tirupattur (Sivaganga)
Party	Candidate	Votes	%	±%
DMK	K. R. Periyakaruppan	83,485	48.25	+3.4
AIADMK	Raja Kannappan	81,901	47.34	+7.73
Independent	M. Manickavalli	1,289	0.75	New
IJK	M. Singaravelu	1,270	0.73	New
BJP	M. Sheik Dawood	1,154	0.67	−1.22
Margin of victory		1,584	0.92	−4.33
Turnout		173,020	79.20	8.60
Registered electors		218,453		
DMK hold		Swing	3.40	

=== 2006 ===
2006 Tamil Nadu Legislative Assembly election: Tirupattur (Sivaganga)
Party	Candidate	Votes	%	±%
DMK	K. R. Periyakaruppan	48,128	44.85	+13.17
AIADMK	K. K. Umadhevan	42,501	39.61	+0.92
DMDK	Maruthu Alaguraj	12,111	11.29	New
BJP	S. Sivaraman	2,029	1.89	New
Independent	G. Lakshmi	1,332	1.24	New
BSP	A. P. Akbar	1,211	1.13	New
Margin of victory		5,627	5.24	−1.77
Turnout		107,312	70.60	8.34
Registered electors		151,997		
DMK gain from AIADMK		Swing	6.16	

=== 2001 ===
2001 Tamil Nadu Legislative Assembly election: Tirupattur (Sivaganga)
Party	Candidate	Votes	%	±%
AIADMK	K. K. Umadhevan	50,165	38.69	+6.68
DMK	R. Sivaraman	41,075	31.68	−15.88
MDMK	Sevanthiappan Pulavar	4,589	3.54	−0.08
Independent	P. Gunasekaran	1,646	1.27	New
NCP	S. U. Gahan Raam Chattrapathi	1,142	0.88	New
Margin of victory		9,090	7.01	−8.55
Turnout		129,674	62.26	−4.42
Registered electors		208,277		
AIADMK gain from DMK		Swing	-8.87	

=== 1996 ===
1996 Tamil Nadu Legislative Assembly election: Tirupattur (Sivaganga)
Party	Candidate	Votes	%	±%
DMK	R. Sivaraman	58,925	47.56	+19
AIADMK	S. Kannappan	39,648	32.00	−24.77
MDMK	S. Sevanthiappan	4,488	3.62	New
Margin of victory		19,277	15.56	−12.65
Turnout		123,897	66.68	3.01
Registered electors		193,029		
DMK gain from AIADMK		Swing	-9.21	

=== 1991 ===
1991 Tamil Nadu Legislative Assembly election: Tirupattur (Sivaganga)
Party	Candidate	Votes	%	±%
AIADMK	Raja Kannappan	63,297	56.77	+38.09
DMK	S. Seventhiappan	31,841	28.56	−0.91
Margin of victory		31,456	28.21	18.67
Turnout		111,503	63.67	−9.11
Registered electors		181,330		
AIADMK gain from DMK		Swing	27.30	

=== 1989 ===
1989 Tamil Nadu Legislative Assembly election: Tirupattur (Sivaganga)
Party	Candidate	Votes	%	±%
DMK	S. S. Thennarasu	33,639	29.47	−1.55
INC	R. Arunagiri	22,746	19.93	New
AIADMK	Raja Kannappan	21,322	18.68	−35.25
AIADMK	S. Madhavan	16,626	14.57	−39.36
Independent	U. Balu Yaday	1,929	1.69	New
Independent	Mugavai Ramachandran	527	0.46	New
Margin of victory		10,893	9.54	−13.36
Turnout		114,148	72.79	−1.33
Registered electors		159,767		
DMK gain from AIADMK		Swing	-24.46	

=== 1984 ===
1984 Tamil Nadu Legislative Assembly election: Tirupattur (Sivaganga)
Party	Candidate	Votes	%	±%
AIADMK	S. Madhavan	51,581	53.93	New
DMK	P. R. Algu	29,673	31.02	New
Independent	M. Krishnan	3,863	4.04	New
Independent	C. Sethu	626	0.65	New
Margin of victory		21,908	22.90	4.70
Turnout		95,649	74.12	10.65
Registered electors		134,589		
AIADMK gain from INC		Swing	9.99	

=== 1980 ===
1980 Tamil Nadu Legislative Assembly election: Tirupattur (Sivaganga)
Party	Candidate	Votes	%	±%
INC	V. Valmigi	34,342	43.94	New
Independent	S. Madhavan	20,116	25.74	New
CPI	S. Shanmugam Koothakudi	18,141	23.21	−6.45
Independent	Samiappan Alias Andiappan	8,199	10.49	New
Independent	A. Vallanattan	696	0.89	New
Margin of victory		14,226	18.20	17.73
Turnout		78,158	63.47	1.05
Registered electors		124,811		
INC gain from CPI		Swing	14.28	

=== 1977 ===
1977 Tamil Nadu Legislative Assembly election: Tirupattur (Sivaganga)
Party	Candidate	Votes	%	±%
CPI	S. Shanmugam Koothagudi	21,579	29.66	New
AIADMK	C. T. Rajachidambaram	21,238	29.19	New
DMK	M. Radhakrishanan	18,898	25.97	−44.16
Independent	N. A. R. Nagarajan	16,496	22.67	New
Margin of victory		341	0.47	−39.80
Turnout		72,761	62.42	−17.19
Registered electors		118,361		
CPI gain from DMK		Swing	-40.48	

=== 1971 ===
1971 Tamil Nadu Legislative Assembly election: Tirupattur (Sivaganga)
Party	Candidate	Votes	%	±%
DMK	S. Madhavan	54,117	70.13	+8.75
INC	S. Sethuramalingam	23,047	29.87	−10.67
Margin of victory		31,070	40.26	19.43
Turnout		77,164	79.60	−2.14
Registered electors		98,591		
DMK hold		Swing	8.75	

=== 1967 ===
1967 Madras Legislative Assembly election: Tirupattur (Sivaganga)
Party	Candidate	Votes	%	±%
DMK	S. Madhavan	40,170	61.38	New
INC	V. S. S. Chettiar	26,532	40.54	New
Independent	A. S. Pillai	1,698	2.59	New
Margin of victory		13,638	20.84	
Turnout		65,446	81.74	
Registered electors		82,816		
DMK win (new seat)				

=== 1952 ===
1952 Madras Legislative Assembly election: Tirupattur (Sivaganga)
Party	Candidate	Votes	%	±%
Independent	Muthiah Chettiar	24,961	56.50	New
CPI	Veerabhadran	10,680	24.17	New
Independent	Ayyadurai	8,537	19.32	New
Margin of victory		14,281	32.33	
Turnout		44,178	59.49	
Registered electors		74,256		
Independent win (new seat)				
