= R. Sivaraman =

Indian politician

R. Sivaraman (died 2007) was an Indian politician and a Member of the Legislative Assembly. He was elected to the Tamil Nadu legislative assembly as a Dravida Munnetra Kazhagam (DMK) candidate from Tiruppattur (194) constituency in the 1996 election.

Sivaraman contested the Tiruppattur constituency again in 2001, when he was runner-up to K. K. Umadhevan of the All India Anna Dravida Munnetra Kazhagam.

Supporters of Sivaraman were initially unhappy when the DMK decided not to let him run for the Tiruppattur seat in 2006. They were placated when he was given the opportunity to stand instead for the Sivaganga constituency.

More violent incidents with which Sivaraman, who owned a stone quarry, became associated occurred in 2007. In February, he was arrested on an allegation of hiring a group of henchmen to damage the offices of a business rival and attack staff there. Then, in June, an explosion that resulted in many injuries and two deaths, including that of P. Murugan, was considered by police to involve a dispute between a faction within the DMK led by Sivaraman and another led by K. R. Periyakaruppan. Murugan was of Sivaraman's group.

Sivaraman died in hospital, aged 46, on 8 July 2007. He was survived by his wife and two children.
