= A. Vellaisamy =

Indian politician

Member of the Tamil Nadu Legislative Assembly
- In office 1977–1984
- Preceded by: A. M. T. Nachiappan
- Succeeded by: V. R. Nedunchezhiyan
- Constituency: Athoor

Personal details
- Party: All India Anna Dravida Munnetra Kazhagam

A. Vellaisamy is an Indian politician and former Member of the Legislative Assembly of Tamil Nadu. He was elected to the Tamil Nadu legislative assembly as an Anna Dravida Munnetra Kazhagam candidate from Athoor constituency in 1977, and 1980 elections. He has a son Sabrinath Vellaisamy and a daughter Sathiabama Vellaisamy.

== Electoral performance ==
Election	Constituency	Political party	Result	Vote %	Opposition			Ref
Election	Constituency	Political party	Result	Vote %	Candidate	Political party	Vote %	Ref
1977	Athoor	AIADMK	Won	45.40%	A. M. T. Nachiappan	DMK	20.03%	
1980	Athoor	AIADMK	Won	58.17%	K. Rajambal	DMK	40.97%	
