= Geopolitical zones of Nigeria =

Major geopolitical division in modern Nigeria

The six geopolitical zones of Nigeria

The Federal Republic of Nigeria is divided into six geopolitical zones, commonly called zones. They are a type of administrative division grouping the country's states, created during the regime of president General Sani Abacha. Nigerian economic, political, and educational resources are often shared across the zones.

The six zones were not entirely carved out based on geographic location, but rather states with similar ethnic groups, and/or common political history were classified in the same zones. Nigeria is made up of approximately 250 ethnic groups and 525 languages. There was a need for the government to merge similar groups for the effective allocation of resources.

== Agitations for constitutional recognition ==
Many groups and individuals in Nigeria including the Afenifere Renewal Movement through its National Publicity Secretary, Mr. Yinka Odumakin, Ohaneze Ndigbo, its late Secretary General, Chief Ralph Uwechue and Ijaw National Congress through its National President, Mr. Joshua Benameisigha have canvassed that the current six zonal divisions be recognized in Nigeria's constitution and be strengthened to function as federating units in the new structure for Nigeria.

According to Chief Nengi James, a Niger Delta activist, "for all sections of the country to become one entity, the geopolitical zones must be recognized in the constitution." These groups are pushing for devolution of powers so that the geopolitical zones become autonomous and manage the resources within their territories in a federal Nigeria.

== List of geopolitical zones ==
- North Central:
  - Consisting of Benue, Kogi, Kwara, Nasarawa, Niger, and Plateau States, as well as the Federal Capital Territory.
- North East:
  - Consisting of Adamawa, Bauchi, Borno, Gombe, Taraba, and Yobe States.
- North West:
  - Consisting of Jigawa, Kaduna, Kano, Katsina, Kebbi, Sokoto, and Zamfara States.
- South East:
  - Consisting of Abia State, Anambra State, Ebonyi State, Enugu, and Imo States.
- South South:
  - Consisting of Akwa Ibom, Bayelsa, Cross River, Delta, Edo, and Rivers States.
- South West:
  - Consisting of Ekiti, Lagos, Ogun, Ondo, Osun, and Oyo States.

== Capital City of Nigerian Geopolitical Zones and Location of Regional Development Commission Office ==
- North Central: Lafia, Nasarawa State
- North East: Maiduguri, Borno State
- North West: Kano, Kano State
- South East: Enugu, Enugu State
- South South: Uyo, Akwa Ibom State
- South West: Ibadan, Oyo State
