= V. S. S. Mani =

Indian politician

V. S. S. Mani Chettiyar

Member of the Madras State Assembly
- In office 1962 - 1967; 1967 - 1972
- Preceded by: T. P. S. Lakshmanan
- Constituency: Athoor

Personal details
- Party: Dravida Munnetra Kazhagam

V. S. S. Mani Chettiyar was an Indian politician and former Member of the Legislative Assembly of Tamil Nadu. He was elected to the Tamil Nadu legislative assembly as a Dravida Munnetra Kazhagam candidate from Athoor constituency in 1962, and 1967 elections.

== Electoral performance ==
Election	Constituency	Political party	Result	Vote %	Opposition			Ref
Election	Constituency	Political party	Result	Vote %	Candidate	Political party	Vote %	Ref
1952	Athoor	Independent	Lost	32.79%	T. S. Soundram Ramachandran	INC	55.08%	
1957	Athoor	Independent	Lost	23.33%	M. A. B. Arumugasamy	INC	42.23%	
1962	Athoor	DMK	Won	50.30%	M. A. B. Arumugasamy	INC	42.32%	
1967	Athoor	DMK	Won	50.70%	R. R. Reddiar	INC	48.36%	
