= M. A. B. Arumugasamy =

Indian politician (born 1917)

Member of the Legislative Assembly, Tamil Nadu
- In office 1957–1962
- Preceded by: Soundaram Ramachandran
- Succeeded by: V. S. S. Mani
- Constituency: Athoor

Personal details
- Born: March 1917
- Died: 31 July 1994
- Party: Indian National Congress
- Profession: Farmer

M. A. B. Arumugasamy (March 1917-31 July 1994) is an Indian politician and a former Member of the Legislative Assembly (MLA) of Tamil Nadu. He hails from Ayyampalayam village in the Batlagundu block of Dindigul district. He completed his primary education at St. Mary's High School in Dindigul. Representing the Indian National Congress party, he contested and won the 1957 Tamil Nadu Legislative Assembly election from the Athoor constituency, subsequently serving as a Member of the Legislative Assembly.

== Electoral performance ==
Election	Constituency	Political party	Result	Vote %	Opposition			Ref
Election	Constituency	Political party	Result	Vote %	Candidate	Political party	Vote %	Ref
1957	Athoor	INC	Won	42.23%	V. S. S. Mani	Independent	23.33%	
1962	Athoor	INC	Lost	42.32%	V. S. S. Mani	DMK	50.30%	
