= Athoor Assembly constituency =

One of the 234 State Legislative Assembly Constituencies in Tamil Nadu, in India

Coordinates: 10.29°N 77.86°E

Athoor
- Constituency No. 129 for the Tamil Nadu Legislative Assembly

Constituency details
- Country: India
- Region: South India
- State: Tamil Nadu
- District: Dindigul
- Lok Sabha constituency: Dindigul
- Established: 1951
- Total electors: 2,62,329
- Reservation: None

Member of Legislative Assembly
- 17th Tamil Nadu Legislative Assembly
- Incumbent I. Periasamy
- Party: DMK
- Elected year: 2026

Athoor is a legislative assembly in Dindigul district, that includes the city of Athoor. Its State Assembly Constituency number is 129. It is one of the 234 State Legislative Assembly Constituencies in Tamil Nadu, in India. Athoor assembly constituency is a part of Dindigul Lok Sabha constituency.

== Members of the Legislative Assembly ==
Election	Member	Party
1952	T. S. Soundram Ramachandran	Indian National Congress
1957	M. A. B. Arumugasamy	Indian National Congress
1962	V. S. S. Mani	Dravida Munnetra Kazhagam
1967	V. S. S. Mani	Dravida Munnetra Kazhagam
1971	A. M. T. Nachiappan	Dravida Munnetra Kazhagam
1977	A. Vellaisamy	All India Anna Dravida Munnetra Kazhagam
1980	A. Vellaisamy	All India Anna Dravida Munnetra Kazhagam
1984	V. R. Nedunchezhiyan	All India Anna Dravida Munnetra Kazhagam
1989	I. Periyasamy	Dravida Munnetra Kazhagam
1991	S. M. Durai	All India Anna Dravida Munnetra Kazhagam
1996	I. Periyasamy	Dravida Munnetra Kazhagam
2001	P. K. T. Natarajaan	All India Anna Dravida Munnetra Kazhagam
2006	I. Periyasamy	Dravida Munnetra Kazhagam
2011	I. Periyasamy	Dravida Munnetra Kazhagam
2016	I. Periyasamy	Dravida Munnetra Kazhagam
2021	I. Periyasamy	Dravida Munnetra Kazhagam
2026	I. Periyasamy	Dravida Munnetra Kazhagam

Madras State

== Election results ==
Vote share of winning candidates
2026	44.79%
2021	72.60%
2016	53.10%
2011	59.58%
2006	53.20%
2001	49.13%
1996	64.09%
1991	68.74%
1989	32.22%
1984	63.16%
1980	58.17%
1977	45.40%
1971	59.70%
1967	50.70%
1962	50.30%
1957	42.23%
1952	55.08%

=== Assembly election 2026 ===
2026 Tamil Nadu Legislative Assembly election : Athoor
Party	Candidate	Votes	%	±%
DMK	I. Periyasamy	106,240	44.79	▼27.81
TVK	N. Kalaiselvi	83,872	35.36	New
AIADMK	A. Viswanathan	32,477	13.69	New
NTK	Dr. A. Simon Justin	9,946	4.19	▼3.33
NOTA	None of the above	812	0.34	▼0.34
Margin of victory		22,368	9.43	▼49.93
Turnout		237,388	90.49	▲11.62
Total valid votes		237,183		
Registered electors		262,329		▼10.15
DMK hold		Swing		

=== Assembly election 2021 ===
2021 Tamil Nadu Legislative Assembly election : Athoor
Party	Candidate	Votes	%	±%
DMK	I. Periyasamy	165,809	72.60	▲19.50
PMK	M. Thilagabama	30,238	13.24	▲12.95
NTK	Dr. A. Simon Justin	17,168	7.52	▲7.08
MNM	P. Sivasakthivel	3,241	1.42	New
AMMK	P. Selvakumar	3,017	1.32	New
Independent	A. Savadamuthu	1,722	0.75	
NOTA	None of the above	1,564	0.68	▼0.24
Margin of victory		135,571	59.36	▲47.52
Turnout		230,266	78.87	▼6.48
Total valid votes		228,376		
Rejected ballots		326	0.14	▲0.03
Registered electors		291,955		▲8.58
DMK hold		Swing		

=== Assembly election 2016 ===
2016 Tamil Nadu Legislative Assembly election : Athoor
Party	Candidate	Votes	%	±%
DMK	I. Periyasamy	121,738	53.10	▼6.48
AIADMK	S. Shajahan	94,591	41.26	New
DMDK	M. Packiya Selvaraj	3,741	1.63	▼29.45
NOTA	None of the above	2,105	0.92	New
Margin of victory		27,147	11.84	▼16.66
Turnout		229,495	85.35	▲1.56
Total valid votes		229,252		
Rejected ballots		243	0.11	▲0.10
Registered electors		268,876		▲18.52
DMK hold		Swing		

=== Assembly election 2011 ===
2011 Tamil Nadu Legislative Assembly election : Athoor
Party	Candidate	Votes	%	±%
DMK	I. Periyasamy	112,751	59.58	▲6.38
DMDK	S. Balasubramani	58,819	31.08	▲23.07
Independent	S. Balasubramani	6,685	3.53	
Independent	T. Raja	3,207	1.69	
BJP	J. Bharanidharan	2,233	1.18	▼0.07
Independent	K. Ramamoorthy	1,384	0.73	
BSP	B. Raja	1,191	0.63	▼0.08
Margin of victory		53,932	28.50	▲9.98
Turnout		190,080	83.79	▲12.93
Total valid votes		189,245		
Rejected ballots		18	0.01	▲0.01
Registered electors		226,859		▲12.07
DMK hold		Swing		

=== Assembly election 2006 ===
2006 Tamil Nadu Legislative Assembly election : Athoor
Party	Candidate	Votes	%	±%
DMK	I. Periyasamy	76,308	53.20	▲6.84
AIADMK	Dindigul C. Sreenivasan	49,747	34.68	New
DMDK	P. Rajesh Perumal	11,485	8.01	New
BJP	D. Muthu Ramalingam	1,794	1.25	New
Independent	S. Muruganandam	1,086	0.76	
BSP	P. Saravanakumar	1,012	0.71	New
Margin of victory		26,561	18.52	▲15.75
Turnout		143,435	70.86	▲9.57
Total valid votes		143,432		
Registered electors		202,430		▼4.85
DMK gain from AIADMK		Swing	▲4.07	

=== Assembly election 2001 ===
2001 Tamil Nadu Legislative Assembly election : Athoor
Party	Candidate	Votes	%	±%
AIADMK	P. K. T. Natarajaan	64,053	49.13	▲24.21
DMK	I. Periyasamy	60,447	46.36	▼17.73
MDMK	C. Jeyaraj	2,570	1.97	New
Independent	A. Mathialagan	1,791	1.37	
Margin of victory		3,606	2.77	▼36.40
Turnout		130,393	61.29	▼7.90
Total valid votes		130,384		
Registered electors		212,758		▲9.79
AIADMK gain from DMK		Swing	▼14.96	

=== Assembly election 1996 ===
1996 Tamil Nadu Legislative Assembly election : Athoor
Party	Candidate	Votes	%	±%
DMK	I. Periyasamy	82,294	64.09	▲34.28
AIADMK	C. Chinnamuthu	32,002	24.92	New
CPI(M)	K. Nagalakshmi	10,743	8.37	New
Independent	K. Jeyaraman	936	0.73	
Margin of victory		50,292	39.17	▲0.24
Turnout		134,087	69.19	▲4.89
Total valid votes		128,403		
Rejected ballots		5,684	4.24	▲1.61
Registered electors		193,792		▲2.39
DMK gain from AIADMK		Swing	▼4.65	

=== Assembly election 1991 ===
1991 Tamil Nadu Legislative Assembly election : Athoor
Party	Candidate	Votes	%	±%
AIADMK	S. M. Durai	81,394	68.74	New
DMK	I. Periyasamy	35,297	29.81	▼2.41
Independent	K. Velumani	840	0.71	
Margin of victory		46,097	38.93	▲35.72
Turnout		121,698	64.30	▼6.31
Total valid votes		118,415		
Rejected ballots		3,205	2.63	▲0.32
Registered electors		189,272		▲12.26
AIADMK gain from DMK		Swing	▲36.52	

=== Assembly election 1989 ===
1989 Tamil Nadu Legislative Assembly election : Athoor
Party	Candidate	Votes	%	±%
DMK	I. Periyasamy	37,469	32.22	▼3.13
INC	N. Abdul Kadhar	33,733	29.01	New
AIADMK	G. Srinivasan	25,869	22.25	New
Independent	S. Thirumalaisamy	16,604	14.28	
Margin of victory		3,736	3.21	▼24.59
Turnout		119,041	70.61	▼1.88
Total valid votes		116,289		
Rejected ballots		2,752	2.31	▼1.62
Registered electors		168,597		▲10.39
DMK gain from AIADMK		Swing	▼30.94	

=== Assembly election 1984 ===
1984 Tamil Nadu Legislative Assembly election : Athoor
Party	Candidate	Votes	%	±%
AIADMK	V. R. Nedunchezhiyan	67,178	63.16	▲4.99
DMK	K. Rajambal	37,605	35.35	▼5.62
Margin of victory		29,573	27.80	▲10.60
Turnout		110,714	72.49	▲9.60
Total valid votes		106,366		
Rejected ballots		4,348	3.93	▲2.55
Registered electors		152,731		▼0.47
AIADMK hold		Swing		

=== Assembly election 1980 ===
1980 Tamil Nadu Legislative Assembly election : Athoor
Party	Candidate	Votes	%	±%
AIADMK	A. Vellaisamy	55,359	58.17	New
DMK	K. Rajambal	38,990	40.97	▲20.94
Margin of victory		16,369	17.20	▼8.17
Turnout		96,498	62.89	▲13.76
Total valid votes		95,171		
Rejected ballots		1,327	1.38	▲0.20
Registered electors		153,445		▲7.05
AIADMK gain from AIADMK		Swing	▲12.77	

=== Assembly election 1977 ===
1977 Tamil Nadu Legislative Assembly election : Athoor
Party	Candidate	Votes	%	±%
AIADMK	A. Vellaisamy	31,590	45.40	New
DMK	A. M. T. Nachiappan	13,938	20.03	▼39.67
INC	R. S. Mani Bharathi	12,200	17.53	New
JP	S. N. Rajagopal	9,476	13.62	New
Independent	M. S. Rayappan	2,382	3.42	
Margin of victory		17,652	25.37	▲1.70
Turnout		70,418	49.13	▼21.86
Total valid votes		69,586		
Rejected ballots		832	1.18	▲1.18
Registered electors		143,340		▲33.27
AIADMK gain from DMK		Swing	▼14.30	

=== Assembly election 1971 ===
1971 Tamil Nadu Legislative Assembly election : Athoor
Party	Candidate	Votes	%	±%
DMK	A. M. T. Nachiappan	42,195	59.70	▲9.00
INC	T. P. S. Lakshmanan	25,467	36.03	New
Independent	R. Sadasivam	3,013	4.26	
Margin of victory		16,728	23.67	▲21.32
Turnout		76,357	70.99	▼6.05
Total valid votes		70,675		
Registered electors		107,556		▲6.98
DMK hold		Swing		

=== Assembly election 1967 ===
1967 Madras State Legislative Assembly election : Athoor
Party	Candidate	Votes	%	±%
DMK	V. S. S. Mani	37,879	50.70	▲0.40
INC	R. R. Reddiar	36,124	48.36	▲6.04
Independent	P. V. Thevar	702	0.94	
Margin of victory		1,755	2.35	▼5.63
Turnout		77,448	77.04	▲9.45
Total valid votes		74,705		
Registered electors		100,535		▼4.91
DMK hold		Swing		

=== Assembly election 1962 ===
1962 Madras State Legislative Assembly election : Athoor
Party	Candidate	Votes	%	±%
DMK	V. S. S. Mani	34,632	50.30	New
INC	M. A. B. Arumugasamy	29,136	42.32	▲0.09
Independent	R. Sadasivam	5,080	7.38	
Margin of victory		5,496	7.98	▼10.92
Turnout		71,465	67.59	▲18.27
Total valid votes		68,848		
Registered electors		105,730		▼3.96
DMK gain from INC		Swing	▲8.07	

=== Assembly election 1957 ===
1957 Madras State Legislative Assembly election : Athoor
Party	Candidate	Votes	%	±%
INC	M. A. B. Arumugasamy	22,929	42.23	▼12.85
Independent	V. S. S. Mani	12,669	23.33	
Independent	L. K. A. Jeyaram	10,139	18.67	
Independent	M. N. Kamatchi	6,077	11.19	
Independent	R. Sadasivam	2,480	4.57	
Margin of victory		10,260	18.90	▼3.39
Turnout		54,294	49.32	▼13.59
Total valid votes		54,294		
Registered electors		110,089		▲47.57
INC hold		Swing		

=== Assembly election 1952 ===
1952 Madras State Legislative Assembly election : Athoor
Party	Candidate	Votes	%	±%
INC	T. S. Soundram Ramachandran	25,849	55.08	New
Independent	V. S. S. Mani	15,388	32.79	New
KMPP	R. Sadasivam	5,697	12.14	New
Margin of victory		10,461	22.29	
Turnout		46,934	62.91	
Total valid votes		46,934		
Registered electors		74,601		
INC win (new seat)				
