= Kalaaliaraq Market =

Market in Nuuk, Greenland

Coordinates: 64°10′43″N 51°44′33″W

Kalaaliaraq Market (Danish: Brædtet) is a fresh food market in Nuuk, the capital of Greenland. It is located in the Old Nuuk neighborhood, approximately 150 m (490 ft) to the southeast of the Nuuk Cathedral, and its name means "The little Greenlander" in Greenlandic language. It is the largest fresh food market in Greenland.

== Social function ==
The market is noted for its fresh fish, as well as whale, reindeer and seal meat, sold directly by the tradesmen. It is an important place for social interaction for many inhabitants, an equivalent of the village pump in other places of the world. Although polar bears are a rarity in Nuup Kangerlua and the entire coastal region of southwestern Greenland, the final journey of the unlikely catch leads to the Kalaaliaraq market; a cause for celebration, and a social event. The municipality has constructed a new and modern building with coolers, freezers and much more, for the sale of caribou meat, musk ox, seal, whale, cod, salmon and much more wild life. This building is situated in the city center.

The market does not sell live animals, but most of the meat is fresh and recently butchered. Only fresh meat was allowed to be sold in Kalaaliaraq until 2018 when the government of Greenland began permitting the sale of dried and salted meat at Kalaaliaraq.

== Hygiene ==
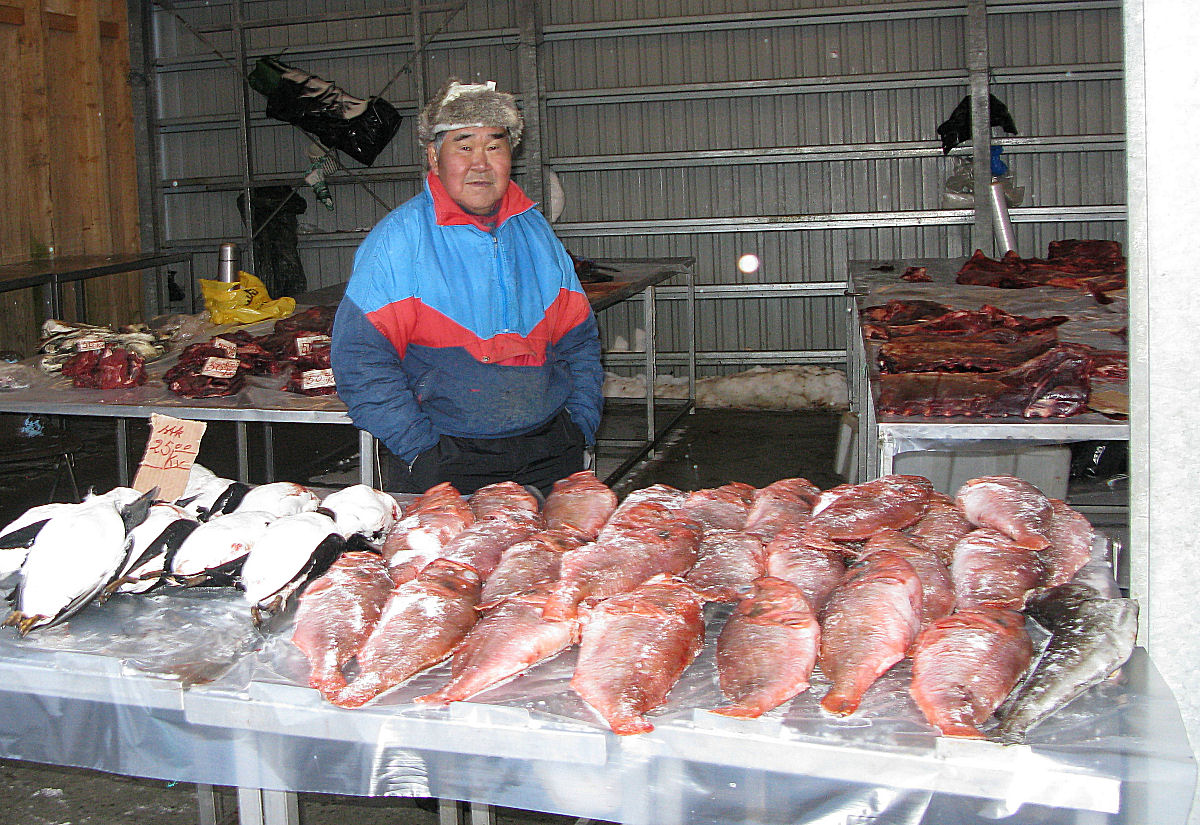
Stall at the Kalaaliaraq market

The standards of hygiene at Kalaaliaraq are often low, a cause for concern for the municipal authorities as of 2007.

Trichinosis is a common problem in Greenland due to the consumption of wild polar bear meat. In 2016, several people were infected with Trichinella roundworms from eating polar bear meat from a local brætter even though the meat had initially passed inspections. As of 2017, Trichinella inspections for seal and polar bear meat is not mandatory.

Outside of Nuuk, in smaller towns and village settlements, seafood in other markets is sold in open-air stands without running water or electricity.
