= S. S. Thennarasu =

Indian politician and writer

- Occupations: Writer and politician

S. S. Thennarasu was a writer and an Indian politician and former Member of the Legislative Assembly of Tamil Nadu. He was elected to the Tamil Nadu legislative assembly from Tiruppattur constituency in the 1989 election. He is also known as the "Siru Kadhai Mannan" he wrote lot of short stories which is famous in Tamil
