= Ijaw National Congress =

The Ijaw National Congress (INC) is a representative body formed in 1991. Members are elected from among the various constituent communities speaking dialects of the Ijaw language. The current INC President is Professor Benjamin Ogele Okaba who was elected and sworn on 14 May 2021 at Ijaw House, Yenagoa in the presence of the Governor of Bayelsa State, Senator Douye Diri and other eminent Ijaw personalities.

Other Members of the INC National Executive Council are Mr. Atamuno Atamuno-Vice President 1, Alabo Nengi James-Vice President 2, High Chief F. J. Williams-Vice President 3, Engr. Ebipamowei Wodu-National Secretary, Mr. Samson Uroupa-National Assistant Secretary, Chief Kennedy Odiowei=National Financial Secretary, Engr. Ezonebi Oyakemeagbegha-National Publicity Secretary, Engr. Onengiyeofori H. Fenibo-National Organizing Secretary, High Chief Phillip Brown Agu-National Treasurer, Barr. Bomo Tons-Fetepigi Obhe-National Legal Adviser, High Chief Tamara-emi Taiwo Abisagbo-National Auditor, Mrs Peremo Isenah Opiah-National Welfare Secretary and Alali Danagogo-National Women Affairs Secretary.

The INC also have Zonal, Clan, Chapter and Community executives to pilot its affairs at the various levels. The pioneer elected Chairman of INC in the Americas is Sir.Kenneth Ibiene Anga Ksc elected in May 2022
