= K. R. Periyakaruppan =

Indian politician

Minister for Co Operatives Government of Tamil Nadu
- In office 14 December 2022 – 5 May 2026
- Minister: Rural Development. 7 May 2021 - 14 Dec 2022; Co-operatives 14 Dec 2022 - *
- Chief Minister: M. K. Stalin
- Preceded by: S. P. Velumani

Minister for Hindu Religious and Charitable Endowments of Tamil Nadu

Minister for Slum Clearance and Accommodation of Tamil Nadu
- In office 13 May 2006 - 21 May 2011
- Chief Minister: M. Karunanidhi

Member of Tamil Nadu Legislative Assembly for Tiruppattur
- In office 11 May 2006 – 5 May 2026

Personal details
- Born: 30 December 1959 (age 66) Aralikkottai, Tamil Nadu, India
- Party: Dravida Munnetra Kazhagam
- Spouse: Prema
- Children: P. R. Karuthan

K. R. Periyakaruppan is the Minister of Co-operatives for The Government of Tamil Nadu. He was formerly the Minister of Rural Development and Poverty Alleviation. He also served as the former minister for Hindu Religious and Charitable Endowments in Tamil Nadu. He was born in Aralikkottai on 30 December 1959. He has finished his bachelor's degree in Commerce and Law. He was elected consecutively to the Tamil Nadu legislative assembly from Tirupattur constituency (Sivaganga district) in 2006, 2011, 2016 and 2021 elections as a Dravida Munnetra Kazhagam candidate.

== Elections Contested ==
=== Tamil Nadu Legislative Assembly Elections Contested ===
Elections	Constituency	Party	Result	Vote percentage	Opposition Candidate	Opposition Party	Opposition vote percentage
2006	Tiruppattur	DMK	Won	44.85	K. K. Umadhevan	AIADMK	39.61
2011	Tiruppattur	DMK	Won	48.25	Raja Kannappan	AIADMK	47.34
2016	Tiruppattur	DMK	Won	55.72	K. R. Asokan	AIADMK	34.58
2021	Tiruppattur	DMK	Won	49.39	Marudhu Alaguraj	AIADMK	31.59
2026	Tiruppattur	DMK	Lost	42.592289%	Srinivasa Sethupathi	TVK	42.592802%
