= List of oldest companies in India =

This list of oldest companies in India includes brands and companies, excluding associations and educational, governmental, or religious organisations. To be listed, a brand or company name must remain, either in whole or in part, since inception and should have been established before 1947 and be currently operational. If the original name has since changed due to acquisitions or renaming, this must be verifiable.

The oldest company in India is the Wadia Group, whose origins are traceable to 1736, with its subsidiary The Bombay Burmah Trading Corporation Limited, established in 1863, being the oldest publicly traded company in India.

== List ==
Name	Year established
Wadia Group	1736
Cox & Kings	1758
Forbes & Company	1767
Parrys	1788
Bank of calcutta	1806
Rama Prasad Goenka Group (RPG Group)	1820
Purshottam Narayan Gadgil (P. N. Gadgil Jewellers)	1832
The Times Group	1838
Higginbotham's	1844
Mohan Meakin	1855
Aditya Birla Group	1857
Chandra Kant Birla Group (CK Birla Group)	1857
United Breweries Group	1857
Alipore Jail Press	1858
Greaves Cotton	1859
J Thomas & Co. Pvt. Ltd.	1861
Andrew Yule and Company	1863
Bombay Burmah Trading Corporation	1863
Spencer's Retail	1863
Tribhovandas Bhimji Zaveri	1864
Shapoorji Pallonji Group	1865
Nestlé India	1866
Balmer Lawrie and Co.	1867
Tata Group	1868
McLeod Russel	1869
Khatau	1874
Bombay Stock Exchange	1875
British India Corporation	1876
Arthur Henry Wheeler (A. H. Wheeler)	1877
Crompton Greaves (CG Power and Industrial Solutions)	1878
The Hindu Group	1878
Bombay Dyeing	1879
Calcutta Tramways Company	1880
Sri Venkateswar Steam Press	1880
Thomas Cook India	1881
Dabur India Ltd.	1884
Garden Reach Shipbuilders & Engineers	1884
Parvathy Mills Limited	1884
Shaw Wallace	1886
The Muthoot Group	1887
Muthoot Pappachan Group	1887
Kirloskar Brothers Limited	1888
Kirloskar Group	1888
Anyonya Co-operative Bank	1889
Delhi Cloth & General Mills	1889
Batliboi	1892
Britannia Industries	1892
Ahmedabad Stock Exchange	1894
Amrutanjan Healthcare	1893
Punjab National Bank	1894
Century Textile and Industries	1897
Godrej and Boyce	1897
Godrej Group	1897
Calcutta Electric Supply Corporation (CESC Limited)	1897
Murugappa Group	1900
Bengal Chemicals and Pharmaceuticals	1901
Goodyear India	1901
The Indian Hotels Company	1902
Nahoum & Sons	1902
Shalimar Paints	1902
Taj Hotels	1902
Umesh Laldas Jamnadas Khushaldas (ULJK Group)	1903
City Union Bank	1904
Phoenix Mills	1905
Tamil Nadu State Cooperative Bank (TNSC Bank)	1905
Aurora Film Corporation	1906
Bank of India	1906
Canara Bank	1906
Cosmos Co-operative Bank Ltd	1906
Hamdard India	1906
Khoday Group	1906
National Insurance Company	1906
Shamrao Vithal Co-operative Bank	1906
Alembic Group	1907
Alembic Pharmaceuticals Ltd	1907
Indian Bank	1907
Tata Steel	1907
Vadilal	1907
Ador Group	1908
Bank of Baroda	1908
Punjab & Sind Bank	1908
Walchandnagar Industries	1908
Kalyan Group	1909
Apeejay Surrendra Group	1910
Lakshmi Mills	1910
Imperial Tobacco Company of India (ITC Limited)	1910
Tata Power	1919
Zandu Realty	1910
Central Bank of India	1911
Thirukkurungudi Vengaram Sundram (TVS Group)	1911
Braithwaite & Co.	1913
Hinduja Group	1914
Kerala Soaps	1914
Amira Nature Foods	1915
Gujarat Tea Processors & Packers Ltd	1915
The Bangalore Press	1916
Karnataka Soaps and Detergents Limited	1916
Karur Vysya Bank	1916
Amarchand & Mangaldas & Suresh A Shroff & Co	1917
Pune District Central Cooperative Bank	1917
Indian Iron and Steel Company (IISCO)	1918
Juggilal Kamlapat (J. K. Organisation)	1918
Orissa Minerals Development Company	1918
Saraswat Co-operative Bank Ltd	1918
West Bengal State Co-Operative Bank	1918
Biecco Lawrie	1919
Birla Corporation	1919
Kesoram Industries Ltd.	1919
Mahashian Di Hatti (MDH)	1919
Madhav Prasad Birla Group (M.P Birla Group)	1919
New India Assurance	1919
Scindia Steam Navigation Company Ltd.	1919
Union Bank of India	1919
Bridge and Roof Company (India)	1920
Catholic Syrian Bank (CSB Bank Limited)	1920
Kansai Nerolac Paints	1920
State Bank of India	1921
Tamilnad Mercantile Bank Limited	1921
Ananda Bazar Patrika Group (ABP Group)	1922
Gammon India	1922
Khimji Poonja Freight Forwarders	1922
Nainital Bank	1922
Tata Coffee	1922
Berger Paints	1923
Gita Press	1923
Godrej Interio	1923
Pothys	1923
Karnataka Bank	1924
Mavalli Tiffin Room	1924
Popular Prakashan	1924
Mavalli Tiffin Room (MTR Foods)	1924
India Security Press	1925
Kolathappilly Pothayan Namboodiris (KP Namboodiris)	1925
Raymond Ltd	1925
Syndicate Bank	1925
Bajaj group	1926
Darashaw	1926
Dunlop India	1926
Essel Group	1926
Forbes Marshall	1926
Hindustan Construction Company	1926
Lakshmi Vilas Bank	1926
Dhanlaxmi Bank	1927
Hindustan Times (HT Media)	1927
General Motors India	1928
Hong Kong and Shanghai Banking Corporation	1928
South Indian Bank	1928
Tiruvellore Thattai Krishnamachari (TTK Group)	1928
Boroline	1929
Rane group	1929
Rane (Madras)	1929
Reliance Infrastructure	1929
Bajaj Consumer Care	1930
Dalmia Group	1930
Himalaya Wellness Company	1930
Hyderabad Deccan Cigarette Factory	1930
International Netherlands Group Vysya Bank (ING Vysya Bank)	1930
Philips India Limited	1930
Vazir Sultan Tobacco (VST Industries)	1930
Arvind	1931
Bajaj Hindusthan	1931
Bata Shoes	1931
Dalda	1931
Kokuyo Camlin	1931
Federal Bank	1931
Sintex	1931
Vijaya Bank	1931
Punchiri Boat Services Private Ltd	1932
Air India	1932
Air India Cargo	1932
Amco Batteries	1932
Indian Express Limited	1932
Kerala Minerals and Metals	1932
Peerless Group	1932
Hindustan Unilever	1933
Indian Sugar and General Engineering Corporation (ISGEC)	1933
Brihan Maharashtra Sugar Syndicate Ltd.	1934
Eveready Industries India	1934
J L Morison (India)	1934
Mazagon Dock Shipbuilders	1934
Nivia Sports	1934
The Oberoi Group	1934
Bank of Maharashtra	1935
Braithwaite, Burn & Jessop Construction Company	1935
Chemical, Industrial and Pharmaceutical Laboratories (Cipla)	1935
Co-optex	1935
Indrapuri Studio	1935
Linde India	1935
Paper Products Limited (Huhtamaki PPL)	1935
Reserve Bank of India	1935
Associated Cement Companies Limited (ACC)	1936
Godfrey Phillips India	1936
Mysore Paper Mills	1936
Rupa Publications	1936
Bharat Starch Industries	1937
Birla Precision Technologies	1937
Colgate-Palmolive India	1937
Crompton Greaves Consumer Electricals	1937
Haldiram's	1937
Indian Overseas Bank	1937
Mukand	1937
Mysore Paints and Varnish	1937
Tata Investment Corp	1937
LGB	1937
Aravind Laboratories	1938
Bajaj Electricals	1938
Jammu & Kashmir Bank	1938
Kerala State Road Transport Corporation	1938
Larsen & Toubro Limited	1938
United India Insurance Company	1938
Delhi Press	1939
Godavari Biorefineries	1939
Muthoot Finance	1939
Naihaa	1939
S. Chand Group	1939
Tata Chemicals	1939
Hindustan Aeronautics Limited	1940
Sanspareils Greenlands	1940
Hindustan Shipyard	1941
Asian Paints Ltd	1942
Hindustan Motors	1942
Hyderabad Allwyn	1942
Baden Aniline and Soda Factory (BASF India)	1943
Blue Star	1943
Chelpark	1943
Fertilisers and Chemicals Travancore	1943
Filmistan	1943
International Paper	1943
Oriental Bank of Commerce	1943
Praga Tools	1943
Radico Khaitan	1943
Ratnakar Bank (RBL Bank)	1943
Signet Press	1943
Escorts Group	1944
Havmor Ice Cream	1944
Unichem Laboratories	1944
Amalgamations Group	1945
Avichi Meiyappa (AVM Productions)	1945
Bajaj Auto	1945
Essar Shipping	1945
Islamic Publishing House	1945
Kamani Engineering Corporation (KEC International)	1945
Mahindra Group	1945
Mahindra & Mahindra	1945
Tata Motors	1945
Western India Palm Refined Oils (Wipro)	1945
Abbott Laboratories (India) Ltd	1946
Amul	1946
Delhi Land and Finance (DLF)	1946
Hindustan National Glass & Industries Limited	1946
Jaico Publishing House	1946
Martin Burn	1946
Madras Rubber Factory (MRF)	1946
National Bearings Company (NBC Bearings)	1946
Travancore Titanium Products	1946

== See also ==
- List of companies of India
- List of oldest banks in India
- Category:Companies of India by year of establishment
