= W. W. Ladden =

Indian politician

W. W. Ladden OBE (1896–1971) was a British businessman and politician. He served as the Managing Director of Simpson and Co and was, in 1933, elected the mayor of Madras.

== Early life ==
Ladden was born to W. Ladden on 26 May 1896 in Hampshire in the United Kingdom and educated at the Maitland Park School. He served as an ambulance driver on the Western Front during the First World War, and was awarded the Military Medal for Bravery.

== Career ==
Ladden joined the Simpson and Co of Madras and rose to become its managing director in the early 1930s. In 1938, along with Sir Alexander McDougall, Ladden founded the Amalgamations Group. In a major business expansion in 1945, the group acquired Associated Publishers who published The Madras Mail and ran the bookstore Higginbotham's. Ladden had to resign as managing director yielding way to S. Anantharamakrishnan when the group nationalized on India's independence in 1947.

Ladden, however, continued to head the Amalgamations' London-based subsidiary Wallace Cartwright and Co well into the sixties.

He was selected Mayor of Madras for 1933 and Sheriff of Madras afterwards. He was invested OBE in 1935.

== Death ==
Ladden died in 1971 at the age of 75.

== Notes ==
Preceded by M. A. Muthiah Chettiar	Mayor of Madras; 1933-1934	Succeeded by M. A. Muthiah Chettiar
