= Amco Batteries =

Manufacturing company

Amco Batteries Limited
- Type: Public
- Industry: Battery
- Founded: 1932
- Headquarters: Chennai, Tamil Nadu, India
- Key people: Ramachandra S (CEO)
- Products: Automotive batteries, inverter batteries, genset batteries, UPS batteries
- Parent: Amalgamations Group
- Website: www.amco.co.in

AMCO Batteries Limited, headquartered in Chennai, Tamil Nadu, is an automobile and commercial battery manufacturing company. Founded in 1932, it is a part of Rs. 15,000-crore Amalgamations Group, one of India's largest light engineering groups. Today, AMCO is the leading supplier of two-wheeler batteries to companies like Honda, Hero Motor Corp, Bajaj Auto, TVS, Yamaha, Royal Enfield, Mahindra Two Wheelers etc. It also supplies four-wheeler batteries to TAFE Tractors, Eicher Tractors, Sonalika Tractors etc.

The product profile of AMCO includes automotive, inverter, genset, and UPS batteries. It manufactures a wide variety of batteries across all these product categories. AMCO is a market leader in the two-wheeler battery segment with most of the two-wheelers coming with AMCO Battery's O.E, fitment. The company also manufactures four-wheeler batteries with a product range consisting of factory-charged, dry-charged, and maintenance-free batteries.

== History ==
Founded by Becken Bain, a German national, AMCO became part of Amalgamations Group in 1955. AMCO began operations under the stewardship of the late S Anantharamakrishnan. The company saw exponential growth and expansion under the leadership of late Chairpersons, Dr. A. Sivasailam and Ms. Jayshree Venkataraman.

It was the leading automotive battery manufacturer in the country. AMCO was the trendsetter in introducing two-wheeler batteries in India and was the first company to launch the two-wheeler polypropylene batteries in the years 1984–85. AMCO has got QS 9000:1998, ISO 9001, ISO 14001 and TS16949 certifications which were proof of its quality and high standards.

== Products ==
AMCO manufactures products mainly in four ranges: automobile batteries, inverter batteries, UPS batteries, and genset batteries. Under the automobile battery range, AMCO manufactures batteries for two-wheelers, cars/SUVs/MUVs, tractors, and commercial vehicles.

== Milestones ==
1932

- Accumulator Manufacturing Company Pvt. Ltd is set up by Mr. Becken Bain, a German national

1955

- Purchased by AMALGAMATIONS Group which infused fresh capital. Production commenced under the stewardship of the late Mr. Anantharamakrishnan with the late Mr. K.G. Parameswaran as M.D.

1964

- Signed technical collaboration with M/s. Gould Inc. The only battery company to make all battery components in the house including containers and rubber separators
- Commenced exports to Yugoslavia and USSR and became the largest battery exporter from India. AMCO was awarded the status of Export House by the Government of India
- AMCO was the First Indian Company to make Train Lighting Cells for Railways. This was the initial production
- In the late 1960s, the strategic shift to add automotive batteries to the product mix taken up

1971

- Foundation laid for a modern plant at Hebbal, Bangalore

1974

- On 1 January, commercial production commenced in Hebbal plant

1976

- Export Battery Division commenced at Hebbal plant for making traction batteries for USSR

1980

- AMCO celebrates its Silver Jubilee and expands business to contract manufacturing for MNC brands like MICO, Crompton, etc.

1984

- Collaboration with YUASA Corporation
- AMCO becomes the first battery company to supply batteries to all newer generation vehicles of Hero Honda Motors Ltd., Yamaha Motors India Pvt. Ltd, TVS Motor Company Ltd and Bajaj Auto Ltd.

1985–86

- AMCO adds Maruti Udyog Ltd. with a supply of NS40 batteries. The market moves to Poly Propylene batteries and AMCO starts supplies of such batteries to OEMs including TAFE, Mahindra, TELCO, Ashok Leyland etc.

1992

- Export markets become less attractive. AMCO shifts focus to gain dominance of the domestic market for automotive batteries

1993

- TAFE-Power Source Division is born, with a manufacturing facility at Maraimalai Nagar to enable AMCO to sell more batteries

1994–96

- AMCO took a decision to become an automotive battery company, returning to the Group's core competencies in the automotive sector
- First Battery Company to get ISO 9001 certification in 1994. Today the company has been certified for ISO 14001, QS9000 and now TS16949, ensuring the highest quality parameters

2004

- Parts ways with YUASA Corporation, to emerge with a greater resurgence, more dynamism and better products. OE fraternity grows to include Honda Motorcycle and Scooter India Ltd., LML, Kinetic Motors etc. in the Two-Wheeler segment. In the Four-Wheeler segment, VST Tillers Ltd, SAS Motors (Manufacturers of Angad Tractors), Cummins India Ltd, Toyota Kirloskar Motor Ltd became OE customers.

2005 onward

- AMCO's Hebbal operations shifted to Mysore Road with a state of art battery line.
- Undisputed leader in the two-wheeler market, two out of three new generation vehicles on the road have AMCO
- Recipient of Vendor Awards from M/s. Honda Motorcycle & Scooter India Pvt Ltd., M/s. Hero Motocrop Ltd., M/s. Bajaj Auto Ltd, M/s.International Tractors Ltd., and M/s. Toyota Kirloskar Motor Pvt. Ltd.
- A large dealer network of over 1000 dealers spread all over India keeps the Brand AMCO alive and growing, enabling good sales. The after-sales service support for OEMs is also provided by the same dealer fraternity in addition to supporting their own sales

== Amalgamations Group ==
Amalgamations Group, founded in the year 1938, is an Indian business conglomerate based out of Chennai. The Group has companies operating across diverse industries. The Group has an interest in Manufacturing, Plantations, Trading, and Distribution and Services. It is among India's top Light Engineering Conglomerates. The group has 47 companies under its fold which operate 50 manufacturing plants. The most notable companies of the group are Tractor and Farm Equipment Limited (Better known as TAFE), Simpsons & Company, T Stanes & Co, AMCO Batteries, Higginbotham's, and Addisons Paints.

The group's history traces back to the year 1935 when Mr. Sivasailam Anantharamakrishnan joined the Simpsons Group, a British-owned South Indian business conglomerate, as Secretary in 1935. In the year 1938, he was one of the three directors on the board when Simpsons formed a holding company. It was converted into a public limited company the next year, which later became Amalgamations Group in 1941. In the 1940s Anantharamakrishnan lead the rapid expansion of the group, even though he became its Chairman only in the year 1953.

The Amalgamations Group after acquiring 100-year-old Simpsons in 1941, started acquiring several prominent old companies of South India like Higginbotham's, Associated Printers, Associated Publishers, Addison & Co., SRVS, George Oakes, T.Stanes, The United Nilgiri Tea Estates and Stanes Amalgamated Estates. From the 1950s onward the group's auto component manufacturing companies have supplied products to all the major OEM suppliers, helping them in reducing dependence on imports. The Group companies have formed several alliances with international partners to boost their technological capabilities. These alliances along with internal innovation, R & D and continuous zeal for New Product Development have led to group companies gaining a good share in the "After Sales Market" as well.
