= Atul Tandon =

Professor Atul Tandan, acronym as PAT, was an Indian management academic and corporate associate.

== Biography ==
Tandan was born in 1948 and studied BTech from IIT Bombay and MBA IIM Ahmedabad. In his career spanning four decades, he worked with Hindustan Lever Ltd., Cadbury (India) Ltd., Bajaj Electricals Ltd. and JL Morison (India) Ltd.

He was associated with management education since 1984 and joined full-time as academic in 1996. He also taught at several institutions in India, UK, France and Sri Lanka. He was also modelled for Lipton tea advertisement. He worked as a consultant and taught at SVKM's NMIMS, Mumbai, SIIB Pune as a Marketing Professor. Later he served as Director of Mudra Institute of Communications, Ahmedabad (MICA) from March 2001 to March 2009. He was residing at Ahmedabad and spending half of his time in Ludhiana. He was the director for the Post Graduate Diploma in Management programme at PCTE Group of Institutes in Ludhiana.

He died on 1 March 2015 in London due to a cardiac arrest.

== Personal life ==
He was married to Priya and had a daughter - Karishma and a son - Samvit.
