= The Spectator (Indian newspaper) =

Indian English language digital newspaper

The Spectator Daily
- Type: Online Newspaper, previously a Weekly newspaper
- Publisher: J. Ouchterlony
- Founded: 1836
- Language: English
- Headquarters: Chennai, India
- Website: spectatordaily.com

The Spectator Daily is an Indian English language digital news publication (formerly a weekly compact newspaper) based in Chennai. It was first published from Madras (now Chennai) between 1836 and 1859. It is the first weekly newspaper to be published from the city.

== History ==
The Spectator Daily was founded as a weekly in 1836 with J. Ouchterlony as its first publisher. After him, the newspaper was published by C. Sooboo Moodely and C. M. Pereira. The Spectator became a daily newspaper in 1850; it is the first daily English newspaper to be published from Madras. The newspaper was purchased by Gantz and Sons and merged with The Madras Times in 1859. In 1921, The Madras Times ceased publishing and the rights were taken by The Spectator (India) publishing house.

The newspaper returned to digital version in early 2023.
