= A. Sivasailam =

Indian industrialist

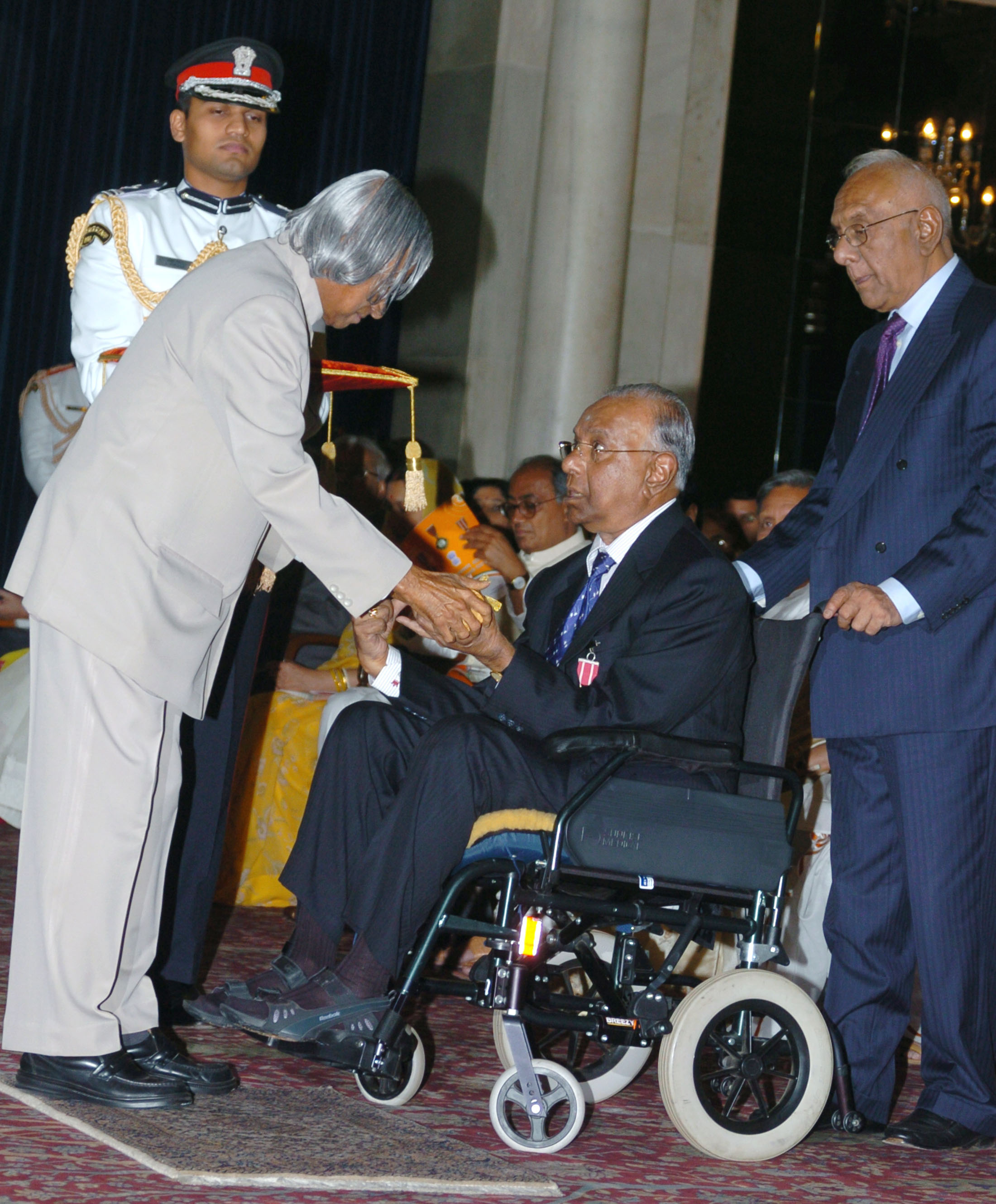
- The President, Dr. A.P.J. Abdul Kalam presenting Padma Shri to Shri Anantharamakrishnan Sivasailam, at an Investiture-II Ceremony at Rashtrapati Bhavan in New Delhi on 5 April 2007
- Born: 24 August 1934; Alwarkurichi, Tirunelveli district, Madras Presidency, British India
- Died: 12 January 2011 (aged 76); Kasturba Hospital, Manipal, Karnataka, India
- Education: Loyola College, Chennai
- Occupations: Industrialist; Educationist; Philanthropist
- Years active: 1957–2011
- Known for: Amalgamations Group
- Spouse: Indira Sivasailam
- Children: Mallika Srinivasan; Jayashree Venkatraman
- Parent: S. Anantharamakrishnan (father)
- Awards: Padma Shri; NIQA Outstanding Industrialist Award; SAE India Lifetime Achievement Award; SIAM Lifetime Achievement Award; AIMA Distinguished Service Award; ACMAI Golden Jubilee Lifetime Contribution Award
- Website: Website of Amalgamations Group

Anantharamakrishnan Sivasailam (24 August 1934 – 12 January 2011) was an Indian industrialist, educationist, philanthropist and a former chairman and managing director of Amalgamations Group of Industries, a ₹ 70 billion conglomerate hosting a workforce of over 12,000 (as of 2011). He headed the business family which was listed by Forbes as the 37th richest in India in 2015, with a net worth of US$ 2.5 billion. He was the president of the Society of Indian Automobile Manufacturers (1970, 1971) and ASSOCHAM and held the office of the Sheriff of Madras during 1969–1970. The Government of India awarded him the fourth highest civilian honour of the Padma Shri, in 2007, for his contributions to Indian industry.

== Biography ==
Sivasailam was born on 24 August 1934, at Alwarkurichi in Tirunelveli district, which is now the south Indian state of Tamil Nadu, to S. Anantharamakrishnan, the founder of Amalgamations Group, as the elder of his two sons. He graduated in commerce from Loyola College, Chennai, of the University of Madras and started his career as an accountant at a chartered accountancy firm in London where he worked for four years. In 1957, he joined his father in their family business as a comptroller and treasurer and took over Tractors and Farm Equipment Limited (TAFE), an industrial venture started by the group in 1960, as its general manager, in 1961. He continued heading TAFE for 7 years and subsequent to his father's death in 1964, he took over the leadership of the group's business and became the chairman of the group officially in 1968, with his brother, A. Krishnamurthy, as its vice chairman. He held the position till his death in 2011 and the group grew during this period from a ₹ 350 million business to ₹ 70 billion conglomerate, composed of 48 subsidiaries and 12,000 strong workforce. The Tractors and Farm Equipment Limited, the flagship company of the group, has since become the largest exporter and the second largest manufacturer of agricultural tractors in India, with an annual output of 100,000 tractors and a turnover of US$1.6 billion.

Sivasailam, a former president of the ASSOCHAM, was the president of the Society of Indian Automobile Manufacturers for two consecutive terms (1970, 1971) and served as the Sheriff of Madras for two years, from 1969 to 1970. He was associated with the Madras Chamber of Commerce and Industry and the Indian Institute of Technology Madras and was the founder of the Paramakalyani Group of educational institutions, Alwarkurichi and the Institute of Environment Sciences at the Manonmaniam Sundaranar University, Tirunelveli. The Tamil Nadu Agricultural University honored him with the degree of Doctor of Science (Honoris Causa) and the National Institute of Quality Assurance awarded him the Outstanding Industrialist Award. He received Lifetime Achievement Awards from SAE India and the Society of Indian Automobile Manufacturers (SIAM) and Distinguished Service Award from the All India Management Association (AIMA). A recipient of the Golden Jubilee Lifetime Contribution Award by the Automotive Component Manufacturers Association of India and an elected Fellow of the Institute of Directors, London, he was included in the Republic Day honours list in 2007 by the Government of India for the civilian award of the Padma Shri.

Sivasailam, died on 12 January 2011 at Kasturba Hospital, Manipal, following a cardiac arrest. His wife, Indira Sivasailam, had preceded him in death; the couple were survived by both their daughters. The elder daughter, Mallika Srinivasan, a Wharton School of Business alumnus, is the chairman and chief executive officer of Tractors and Farm Equipment Limited. She is married to Venu Srinivasan, chairman of the TVS Group. The younger daughter is Jayashree Venkatraman, a director of TAFE and married to Murali Venkatraman, the managing director of WS Industries, a Chennai-based industrial group.

== See also ==
- S. Anantharamakrishnan
- Mallika Srinivasan
- Tractors and Farm Equipment Limited
- Venu Srinivasan
