= The Bangalore Press =

Indian printing and publishing company

- Traded as: The Bangalore Printing and Publishing Company
- Industry: Printing press
- Founded: 5 August 1916; 109 years ago in Kingdom of Mysore (present-day Mysore, Karnataka), India
- Founder: M. Visvesvaraya
- Headquarters: Mysore, Karnataka, India
- Revenue: ₹200-crore (2020)

The Bangalore Press is an Indian printing press company that was founded on 5 August 1916. It is one of the oldest companies of India. The company was established by Sir M. Visvesvaraya, the Prime minister of Mysore. The Bangalore Press prints calendars, diaries, panchangas (almanacs), books and notebooks. It is well known for publishing calendars. It produces 18 lakh calendars each year and has a valuation of nearly ₹200-crore, as reported by The Hindu Business Line.

== History ==
The Bangalore Printing and Publishing Company was founded as a publicly listed company in the year 1916 by Sir M. Visvesvaraya. Sir K. P. Puttanna Chetty was the first chairman, while noted personality C. Hayavadana Rao served as the first secretary of The Bangalore Press. M. Visvesvaraya became an advisor for the Bangalore Press in 1919, after his retirement as Diwan (prime minister) of Mysore. The Bangalore Press was the 'official publisher' of the Wadiyar royal family.

The first editions of the calendars were published in 1921, and it had a green floral frame, with the text in black and red. The first calendar was designed by B. Puttaiah, who was trained in printing technology in London. It started printing calendars in Kannada language from 1936. Masti Venkatesh Iyengar, a Kannada litterateur played an important role in the press printing calendars in Kannada language. It launched the table calendar format in 1988 and a Hindu almanac and Mallige Panchanga Darshini, was added to the product line in 1990.

In January 2013, the company announced the release of the revamped online and mobile versions of its Kannada and English calendars. In January 2020, the company released a special postal cover and a commemorative silver coin to celebrate centenary of The Bangalore Press. It was a publicly listed company and was even listed in the Bangalore Stock Exchange and the Madras Stock Exchange in the 1970s. However, it is no more public company as the two stock exchanges ceased operations in 2013 and 2015 respectively.

== Timeline ==
- 1916: It started as a public company and Sir K.P. Puttanna Chetty was appointed as the chairman of The Bangalore Press.
- 1921: First-ever calendar published in English language.
- 1936: Started publishing calendar in Kannada language.
- 1960: Present design with red, white and black template adopted.
- 1988: The company introduced Table calendars for the first time
- 2010: Free e-calendars available for download.
- 2020: It published the 100th edition of the calendar.

== Notable people ==
- Sir M. Visvesvaraya (founder and later advisor)
- C. Hayavadana Rao (1st secretary)
- Sir K. P. Puttanna Chetty (1st chairman)
- Masti Venkatesh Iyengar

== See also ==
- List of oldest companies in India
