= Mallika Srinivasan =

Indian businesswoman (born 1959)

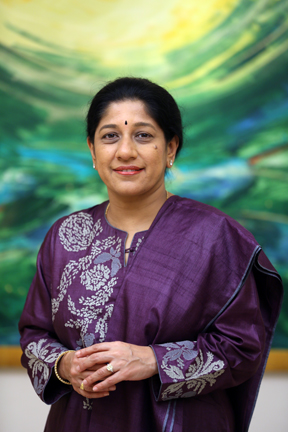
- Born: 19 November 1959 (age 66); Madras, Madras State (present-day Chennai, Tamil Nadu), India
- Education: Women's Christian College; Bharathidasan Institute of Management - University of Madras; University of Pennsylvania
- Occupation: Industrialist
- Organization: TAFE - Tractors and Farm Equipment Limited
- Title: Chairman & Managing Director of TAFE
- Spouse: Venu Srinivasan
- Children: Lakshmi Venu, Sudarshan Venu
- Parents: A. Sivasailam; Indira Sivasailam
- Website: tafe.com

Mallika Srinivasan (born 19 November 1959) is an Indian industrialist and is the Chairman and managing director of Tractors and Farm Equipment Limited, a tractor major incorporated in 1960 at Chennai, India. She is also the Chairperson of the Public Enterprises Selection Board (PESB) constituted by the Government of India since 18 November 2021 . She had served on the Global Board of the U.S.- India Business Council (USIBC) and has led the B20 – India Task Force on “Inclusive GVCs for Resilient Global Trade and Investment” held in August 2023.

== Education ==
She earned her degree in mathematics from the Women's Christian College and later was a university gold-medalist in Econometrics from the University of Madras, she graduated as a member of the Dean's Honor List, and the Alpha Beta Gamma Society, from the Wharton School of Business, University of Pennsylvania, and was ranked as one of its top 125 most successful alumni.

== Career ==
Mallika Srinivasan established TAFE as a one of the world's largest tractor manufacturers. She led the company's growth to its present status with revenues in excess of Rs. 13,700 Crores with diverse interests in tractors, farm machinery, diesel engines, generators, engineering plastics, hydraulic pumps and cylinders, automobile franchises and plantations.

She led a variety of industry bodies such as the Tractor Manufacturers' Association of India, the Madras Chamber of Commerce and has held various positions in industry bodies such as the Confederation of Indian Industry and the Indian Institute of Foreign Trade.

== Philanthropy ==
She supports organizations such as the Sankara Nethralaya (a leading eye care organization), the Cancer Hospital in Chennai, and a number of educational and healthcare facilities in Alwarkurichi, Tirunelveli district in South India. She is also a generous patron of the arts through her involvement in the promotion and support of Carnatic music through the Indira Sivasailam Foundation.

== Awards and accolades ==
Srinivasan has received a number of accolades and awards. In 2011, she was voted Entrepreneur of the Year by Ernst and Young; awarded the Woman Leader of the Year award by Forbes India; and recognized by Forbes Asia as one of the Top 50 Asian Power Businesswomen.

As per Forbes list of India's 100 richest tycoons, dated 9 October 2024, Amalgamations family is ranked 64th with a net worth of $5 Billion.

She was named among the six Most Powerful Women of India Inc. by Business Today, while the Asian Business Leadership Forum (ABLF) honored her with the ABLF Woman of Power Award. NDTV Profit, India's leading business television channel, accorded her the honor of Business Thought Leader of the Year 2012 Award, at the NDTV Profit Business Leadership Awards. In 2018, she was ranked fifth among India's Most Powerful Women in Business by Fortune India. In 2020, she was awarded "Businesswoman of the year" at ET Prime Women Leadership Awards 2020.

Year	Awards and Honors	Awarding organization	Reference
1999	First Business Woman of the Year award for India	BBC	
2005	Zee Astitva Award for Exemplary Women	Zee TV	
2005	National Leadership Award	IIM Lucknow- Lakshmipat Singhania award	
2005–06	Business Woman of the year Award	The Economic Times	
2007	Selected as one of the few in the Wharton's 125 influential people and ideas	Wharton School of Business, University of Pennsylvania	
2004–10	Among 25 Most Powerful Women in Indian Business - for 7 consecutive years	Business Today	
2010	Among 25 Power Women	India Today Woman	
2010	India Inc's Most Powerful Women Leaders	The Economic Times Corporate Dossier	
2011	Entrepreneur of the year - Manufacturing	Ernst & Young	
2012	Among top 6 Most Powerful Women of India Inc	Business Today	
2012	Ranked Among Asia's 50 Power Businesswomen	Forbes Asia	
2012	India Inc's Most Powerful CEOs 2012 Top Women CEOs	The Economic Times	
2012	Forbes India Leadership Awards 2012 Women Leader of the Year	Forbes India	
2012	Doctor of Letters (Honoris Causa)	Hindustan University of Technology & Science, Chennai	
2012	Ranked 2nd among India's 50 Most Powerful Women in Business	Fortune India	
2012	ABLF Woman of Power Award	Asian Business Leadership Forum Awards	
2013	India Today's Power List – The Influencers	India Today	
2013	Business Thought Leader of the Year 2012	NDTV Profit Business Leadership Awards	
2014	Padma Shri for Trade and Industry	Government of India	
2014	Among The Most Powerful Women in Indian Business – Hall of Fame	Business Today	
2014	Ranked among India's Most Powerful Women	Femina	
2014	Ranked among India's Most Powerful Women	Fortune Asia	
2014	Ranked among Most Powerful Women in Indian Business	Fortune India	
2015	Conferred the Sir Jehangir Ghandy Medal	XLRI - Xavier School of Management	
2016	Among BBC 100 Power Women 2016	British Broadcasting Corporation (BBC)	
2016	Conferred the Devi Award	The New Indian Express	
2017	Honorary Doctorate of Science (Honoris Causa)	Tamil Nadu Agricultural University	
2018	Ranked fifth among India's Most Powerful Women	Fortune India	
2021	USIBC Global Leadership Award	U.S.-India Business Council	

== Organisations and affiliations ==
Position	Organization	Reference
Member - Executive Board	Bharathidasan Institute of Management, Tiruchirappalli	
Member - Executive Board	Indian School of Business, Hyderabad	
Member - Governing Board (Rural Technology And Business Incubator)	Indian Institute of Technology, Chennai	
Board Member	AGCO Corporation, United States	
Board Member (Independent, Non-Executive Director)	Tata Steel	
Global Board of Directors	U.S.-India Business Council	
