= Kerala State Industrial Enterprises Limited =

- Type: Holding Company
- Founded: 1973
- Headquarters: Vazhuthacaud, Thiruvananthapuram, Kerala, India
- Website: www.ksie.net

Kerala State Industrial Enterprises Limited (KSIE) is the holding company for the state-owned industrial undertakings of the State of Kerala, India. The company was established in 1973. KSIE have Air Cargo Terminal at Trivandrum International Airport, Air Cargo Terminal at Calicut International Airport, KSIE Business Centres at Thiruvananthapuram, Kochi, Kozhikode, Kottayam and Palakkad. Kerala Soap manufacturing unit Kerala Soaps at Kozhikode. (Kerala Soaps products are now available online through www.keralasoaps.net portal). The e-commerce portal www.keralarcade.com, 'Virtual Office' of Agricultural & Processed Food Products Export Development Authority (APEDA) of the Ministry of Commerce and Industry, Government of India, Cochin International Container Freight Station.

== History and development ==
Kerala State Industrial Enterprises Limited was incorporated on 25 January 1973 as a public sector undertaking under the Government of Kerala's Industries Department. Its original purpose was to manage and rehabilitate financially distressed state-owned industrial enterprises. In 1999, the struggling companies previously associated with KSIE were separated from the organisation, which subsequently concentrated on commercial and industrial services.

The company expanded into air cargo operations in 1979, when it began managing facilities at Thiruvananthapuram Airport. Its operations later extended to Kochi in 1985 and Kozhikode in 1995. Cargo handling at Kochi was subsequently discontinued following the commissioning of Cochin International Airport, while the company continued operating air cargo complexes at Thiruvananthapuram and Kozhikode.

In January 2010, KSIE reopened the Kerala Soaps manufacturing unit at Vellayil in Kozhikode, reintroducing products associated with the former state-owned soap manufacturer. The company also diversified into maritime logistics through the Cochin International Container Freight Station at Kalamassery, which provides container handling, storage and warehousing services.
