= Industry of Machinery and Tractors =

Serbian manufacture company

- Native name: Индустрија машина и трактора Industrija mašina i traktora
- Type: d.o.o.
- Industry: Agribusiness
- Founded: 12 August 1996; 30 years ago (Current form); 1947; 79 years ago (Founded)
- Founder: Government of SFR Yugoslavia and independent tradespeople
- Headquarters: Belgrade, Serbia
- Key people: Kamal Ahuya (Director)
- Products: Agricultural machinery, Tractors
- Revenue: ▼€0.03 million (2016)
- Net income: ▼ -€0.47 million (2016)
- Total assets: ▼€46.48 million (2016)
- Total equity: €0 (2016)
- Number of employees: 4 (2018)
- Parent: TAFE
- Subsidiaries: IMT Remontni centar; IMT Commerce doo
- Website: imttractors.com

Industry of Machinery and Tractors (Serbian: Индустрија машина и трактора, romanized: Industrija mašina i traktora; commonly abbreviated IMT) is a Serbian company which manufactures and sells tractors and other types of farming machinery. Headquartered in Belgrade, Serbia. In April 2018, IMT was bought by the Indian company TAFE.

== History ==
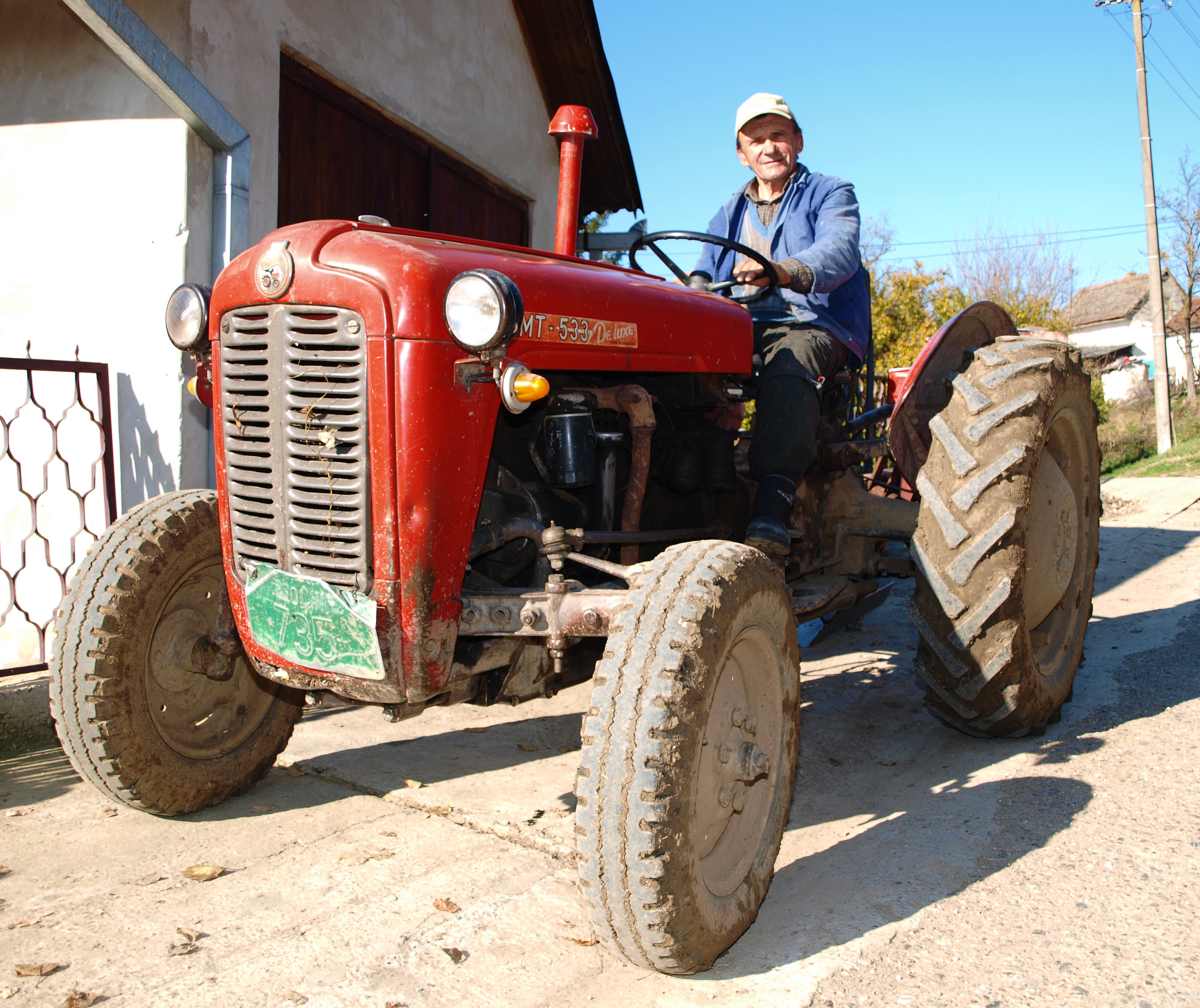
First serie of IMT tractors - IMT 533.

The IMT factory was founded in 1947 as the Central Foundry. In 1949, a new company, the Metal Institute, was formed by amalgamating the Central Foundry and four other local companies. The Metal Institute became the Industry of Machinery and Tractors (IMT) in 1954. The following year, research was conducted on different types of tractors and the Massey Ferguson licence was chosen.

In 1959, the factory was reconstructed and production capacities for 4,000 tractors a year were built. The factory started production of a tractor of their own design in 1964. In 1988, IMT recorded its largest annual production in history - 42,000 tractors and 35,000 machines.

Between 1990 and 2000, changing economic circumstances led to significant changes in production. A long-term co-operation was established with the Perkins company, and the first engines complying to the EU 2000/25/EC standards were built in 2005. In 2008, the Serbian Privatisation Agency launched a tender process for the sale of IMT. In 2012, IMT introduced a new "S" series of tractors. Offer of the new generation of tractors together with purchasing power demanded customisation of tractor accessory. Mostly new models have join of traditional and modern look, thanks to the Belgrade professional schools, Faculties of Design and IMT design studio.

In July 2013, IMT exported tractors in Kazakhstan, ex-Yugoslavia markets, Ecuador and African market. The model which has been exported in Kazakhstan was labelled "Baikonur" (derives from Baikonur Cosmodrome) and it was models 539, 549, 555.11. The company ceased production in August 2015 and went into bankruptcy procedure, with 186 million dollars of accumulated debt.

On 2 April 2018, the company was sold to the Indian manufacturing company TAFE.

== Popular products ==
The most popular of the IMT tractors were the IMT 533 (with 33 hp) and IMT 539 (39 hp). These tractors become popular in Yugoslavia, because they were reliable, easy to handle, manoeuvrable and capable. Their popularity resulted in the advancement of mechanisation and modernisation in rural areas. A more advanced model was later produced in 1965 under the designation IMT 555. The reliability of these three models comes from the characteristics of the engine. Mainly for the fuel pump developed internally by IMT. These engines were renowned for lasting 20000 working hours before needing an overhaul.

IMT 5200-5500 models were among the ten largest tractors on the world market in the 1980s and 1990s. These series were contemporary for that period. Characteristics of these series were: ≈500 hp, V12 diesel FAP and Mercedes-Benz engine, 4WD, 4X4 chassis, synchro gearbox shifter (16 forward and 4 reverse),16 t (35,274 lb), hydrostatic power steering, dual clutch, 3-way adjustable seats, complete safety programs for passengers and drivers, big luggage spaces and air brakes. Additional accessories of 5200-5500 models were: manual A/C, cigarette lighter and ashtray, manual sun or moon roof and radio/cassette recorder.

Other historical models of this company worth mentioning are: 528,530-539P, 542-549 (standard and Deluxe versions), 550–558, 560–569, 570–579, 585–589, 590–597, 5100, 5135–5136, 5170, 5210, 5220, 5270 and 5500.

== Quality and certificates ==
New series of tractors have EC standards. EC stand for European emission standards for engines used in new non-road mobile machinery. IMT products have Stage II and IIIA (model IMT 555.11).

== Products ==
=== Tractors ===
IMT produces the following tractor models:

- IMT 539S
- IMT 549S
- IMT 550S
- IMT 553S
- IMT 555S
- IMT 539
- IMT 536/546
- IMT 549
- IMT 550.11
- IMT 560
- IMT 577
- IMT 2050
- IMT 2065
- IMT 5106/5136
- IMT 5135
- IMT 577/587/597
- IMT 507/508

IMT 539 De luxe

IMT 528

IMT 533

IMT 539 P

IMT 539 DLI

IMT 5500

IMT 555

IMT 558

IMT 540

=== New series of tractors and offer ===
Series 2000, are equipped with: polyester engine cover, synchronised gear shifter, 2 WD, adjustable steering by height, synchronised gear shifter, engines by Perkins or John Deere with EC Stage II standard, easy handling and maintenance. Series 2000, in accessory part refers to A/C, 4WD, heating and hydraulic power steering regulation of position and draft.

At 79 (in 2012) Agriculture Fair in Novi Sad, IMT presented new generation of tractors with mark "S" (539 S, 549 S, 550 S and 555 S). Standard equipment offered: better anti acoustic and rust protection (with viscoelastic deadener ), modern design of cabin, synchronised gear shifter with 10 speeds (forward) and 2 speeds (reverse), polyester engine cover, EC IIIA standard, 4 WD, hydraulic power steering regulation of position and draft. They have been adjusted for attachment and work with implements of large width, mounted or semi-mounted. Accessories for these series includes: A/C, A/C powered by solar panels, car radio (with/without handsfree), seat heating and heating+ventilation (HV).

In IMT at 2013 was announced reproduction of older version of IMT 5360 with governments stimulatives. These type includes the same standard equipment and accessory as series "S".

=== Other ===
Besides tractors, IMT also produces a number of agricultural machinery. Ploughs, trailers, maize planters, seed drills, cultivators and loader forklifts.

== Gallery ==
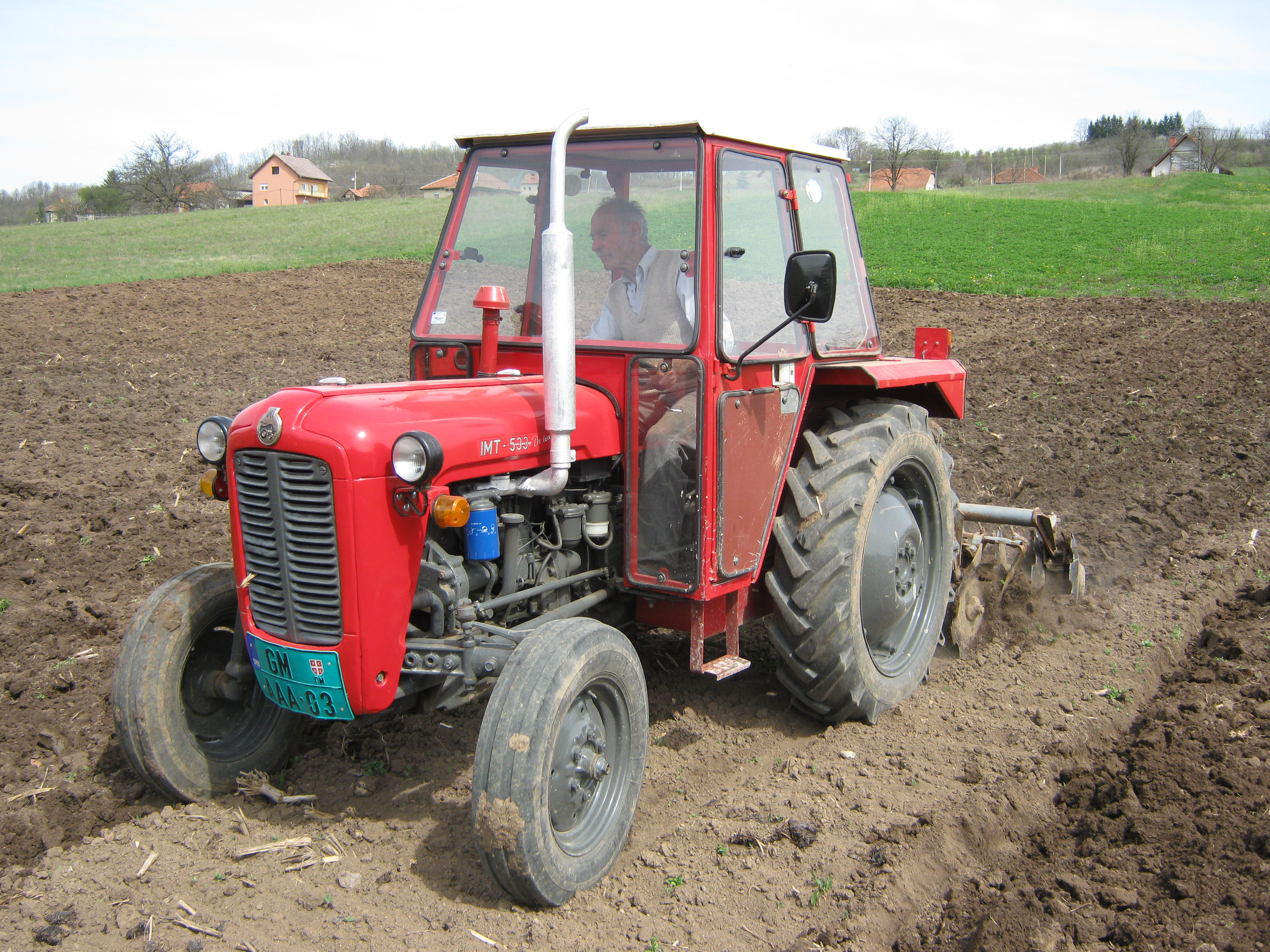
IMT 533 Deluxe from 1973 in Gornji Milanovac, Serbia.

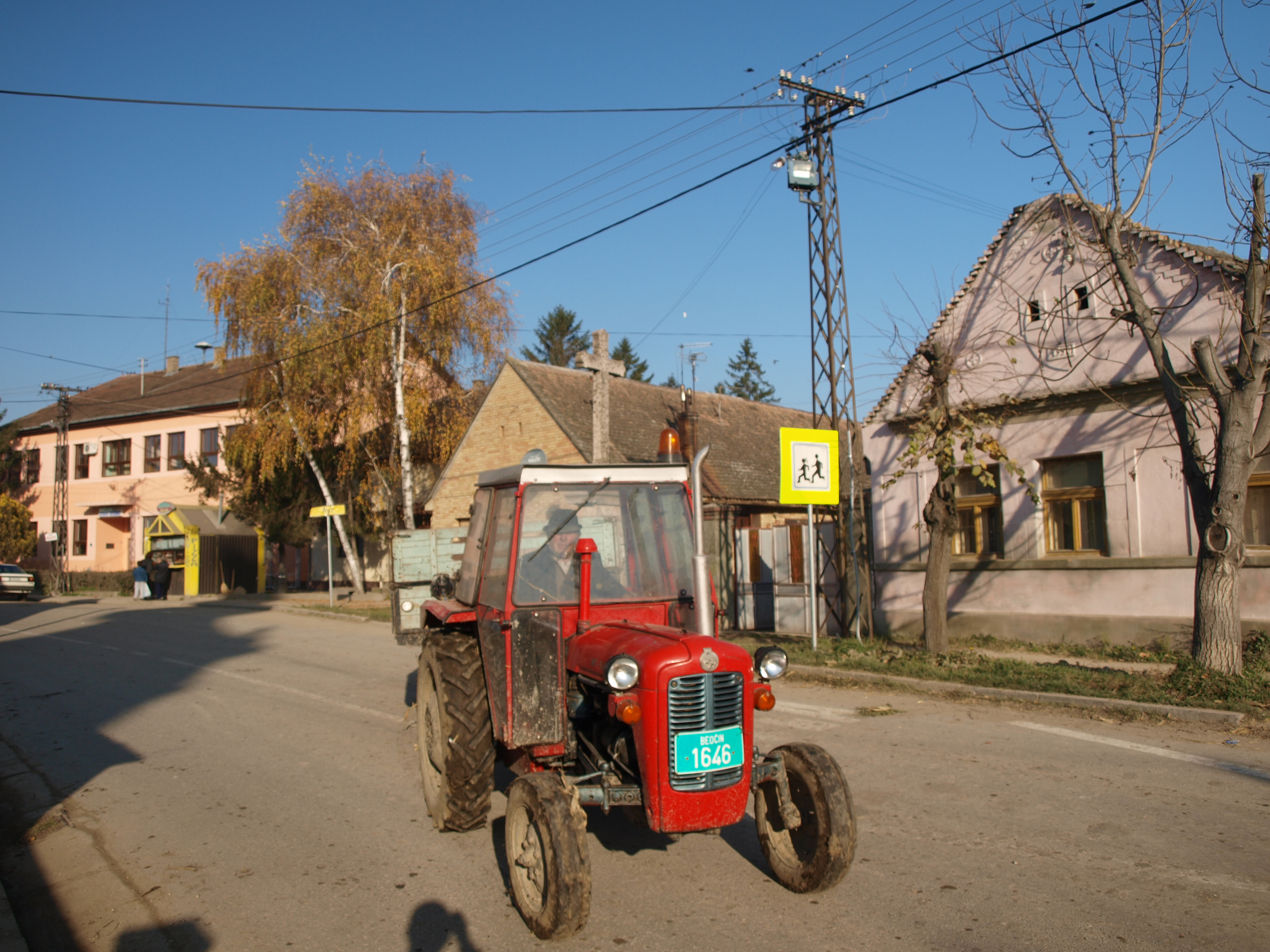
IMT 539 in Susek, Serbia.

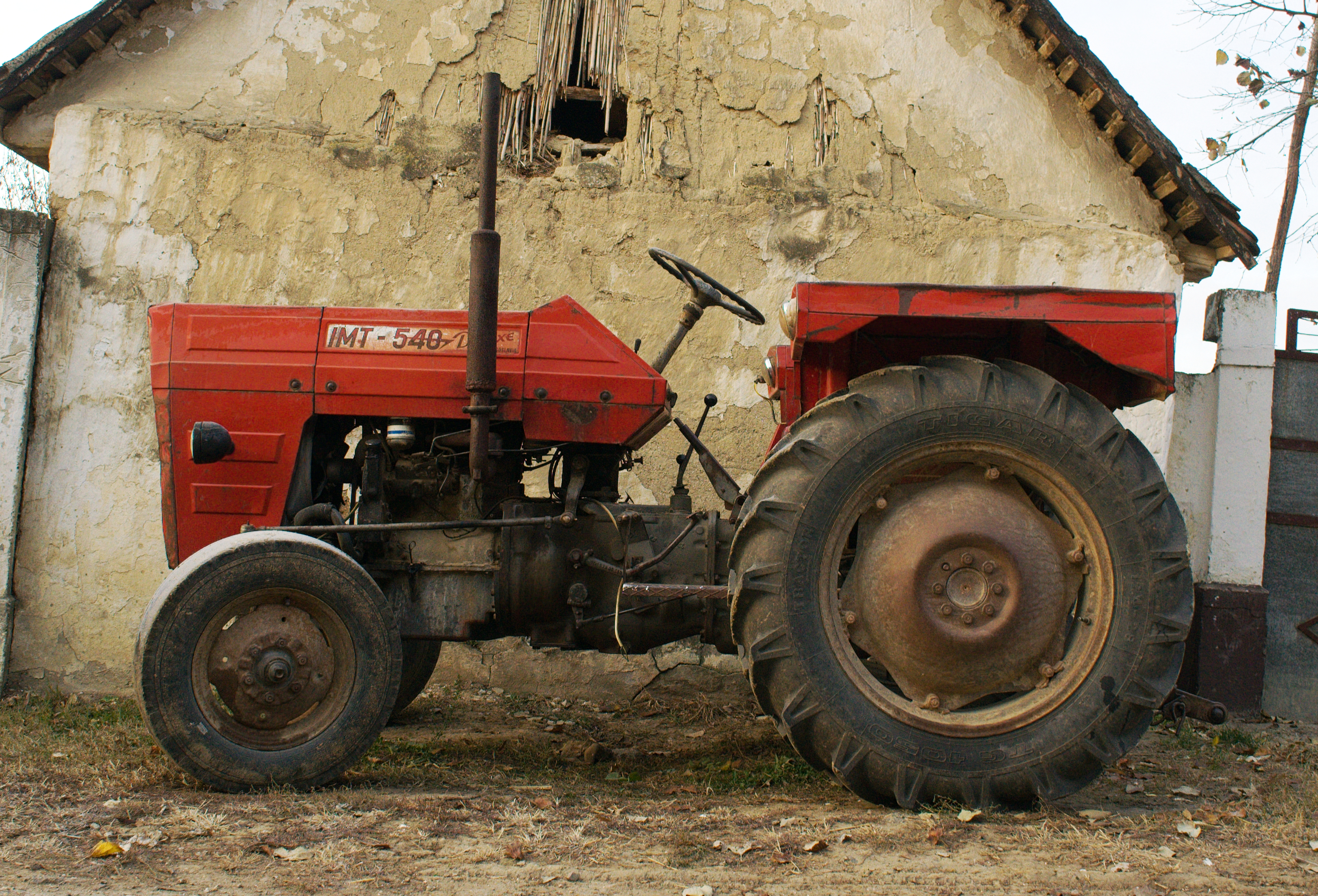
IMT 540 de Luxe in Srem, Serbia.

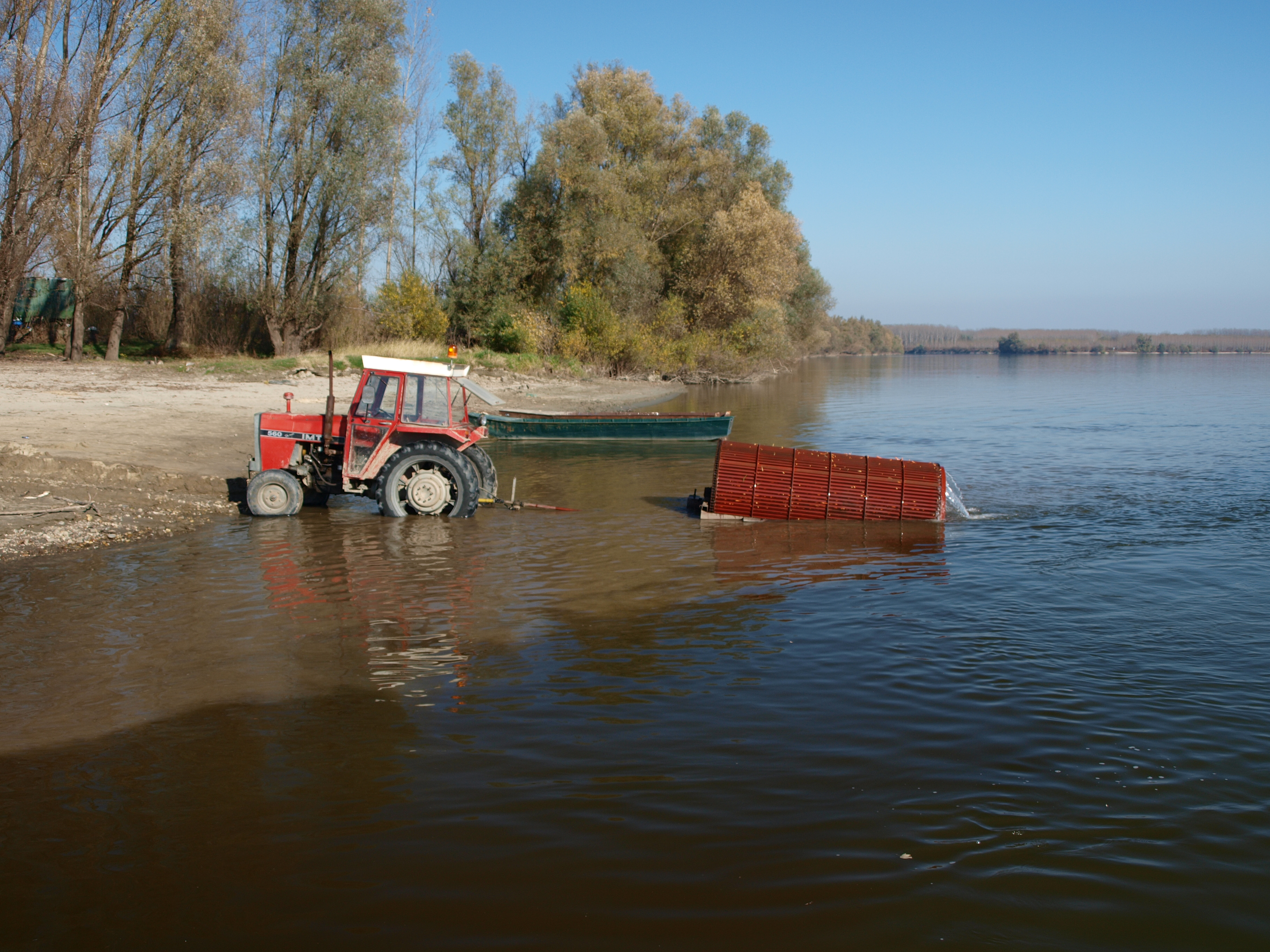
IMT 560 De luxe tractor with a sort of "cage" machine cleaning plenty of carrots in river water; Danube riverbank at Banoštor village in Serbia.

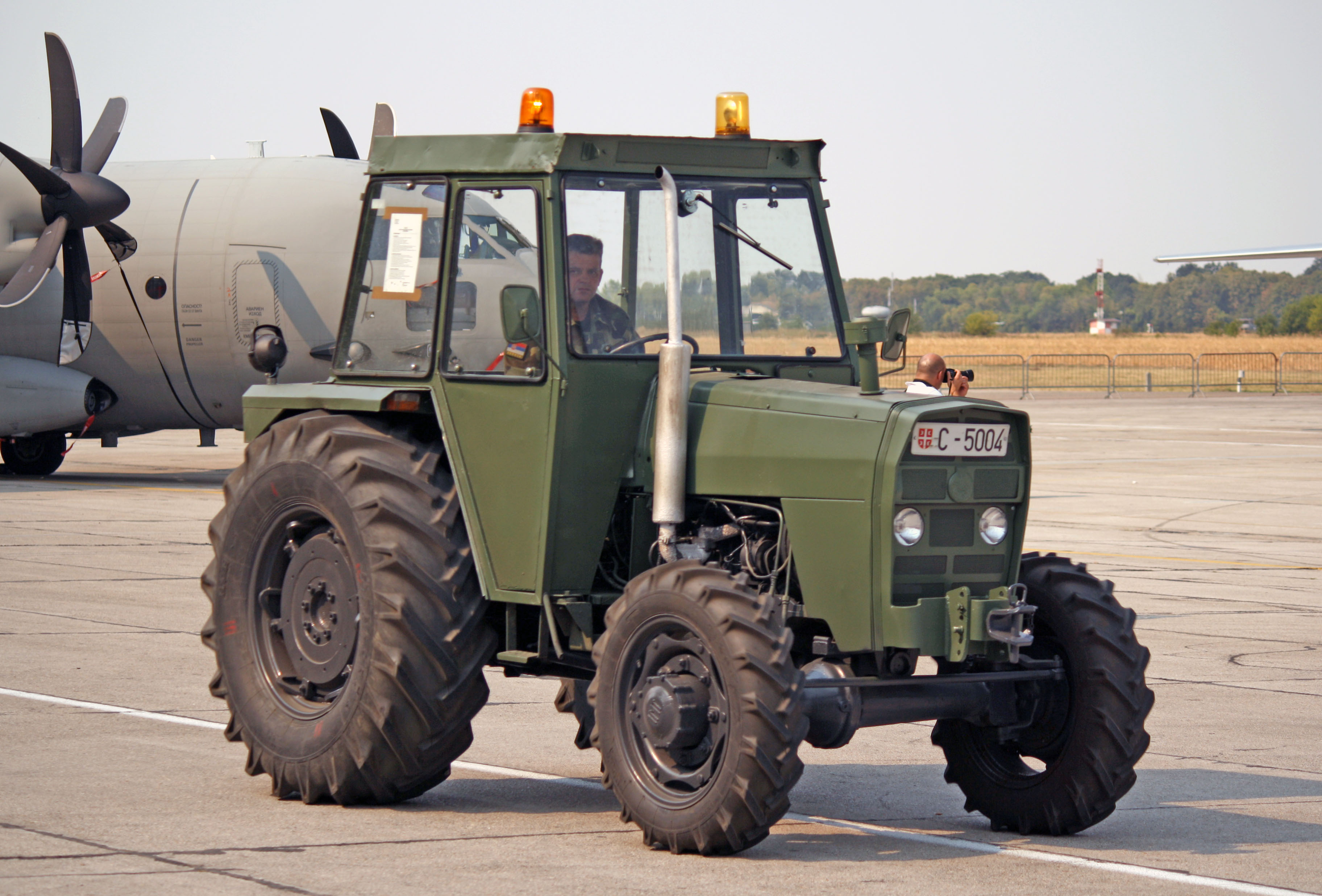
IMT-577DV tractor of Serbian Air Force 204th Air Brigade at Batajnica Air Base, Serbia.

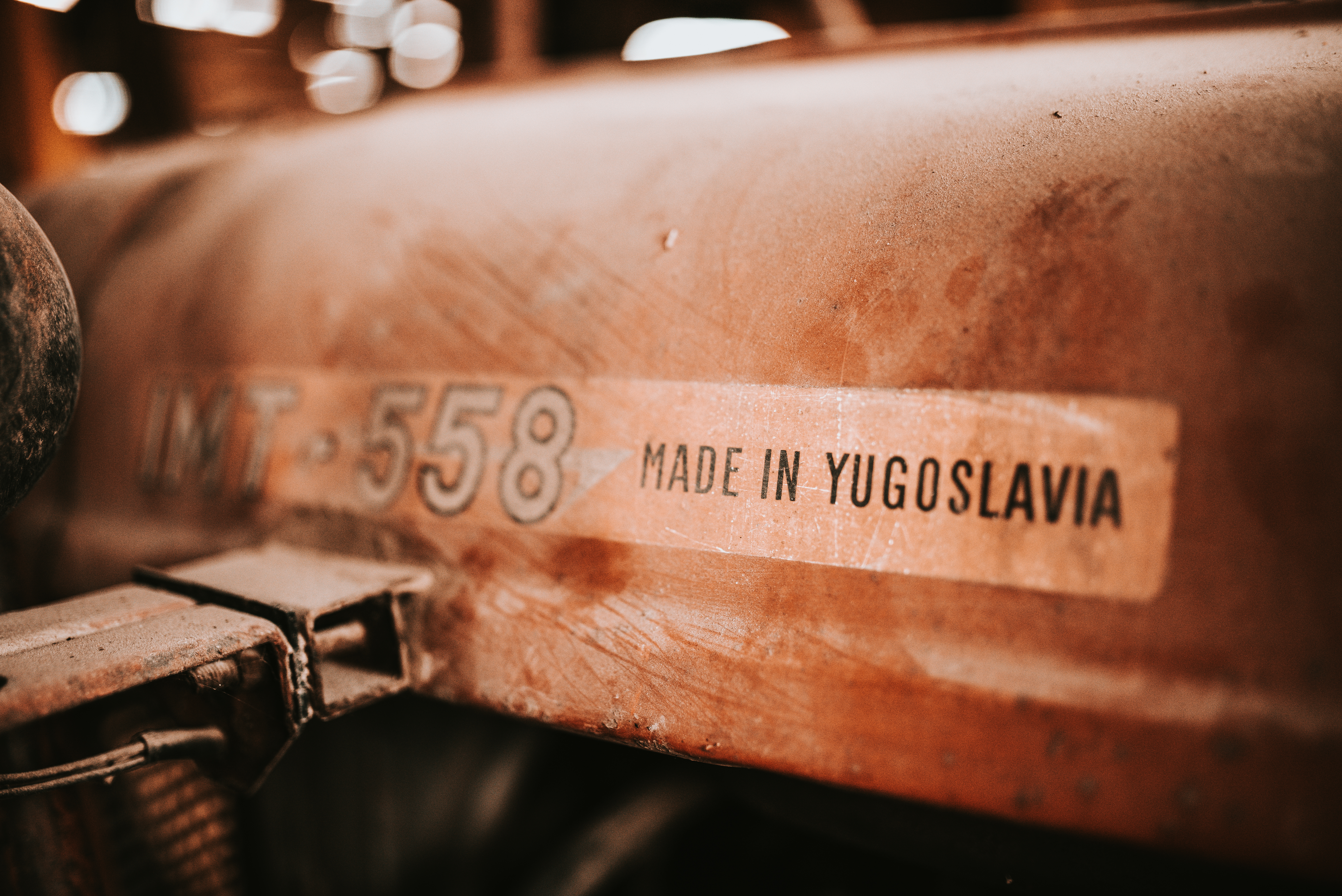
IMT 558 with "Made in Yugoslavia" signature
