= The Madras Times =

- Type: Daily newspaper
- Language: English
- Headquarters: Madras
- Country: India

The Madras Times was an English-language newspaper which was published in the then Madras Presidency from 1835 to 1921.

== History ==
Madras-historian, S. Muthiah claims that The Madras Times was founded as a bi-weekly in 1835–36, though most sources point to 1859, the year of its supposed acquisition by Gantz and Sons, as the founding date of the newspaper. Gantz and Sons also acquired The Spectator, the first major newspaper in South India. The paper was converted to a daily in 1860.

The Madras Times flourished throughout the second half of the 19th century. During the 1870s and 1880s, the paper was edited by William Digby Seymour, the celebrated Indophile. The Madras Times was purchased by business magnate John Oakshott Robinson in 1921. The paper was subsequently merged with The Mail.

== Orientation ==
The newspaper was liberal in its views and favoured amicable relationship between the British who ruled India and the Indian inhabitants. The paper was edited by Charles Cornish and Henry Cornish in 1860s. The duo were later embroiled in a dispute with the management and quit to start The Madras Mail which was the Times' most popular rival and opponent throughout the late 1800s.
