= Gujarat Tea Processors & Packers =

FMCG company

Wagh Bakri tea group

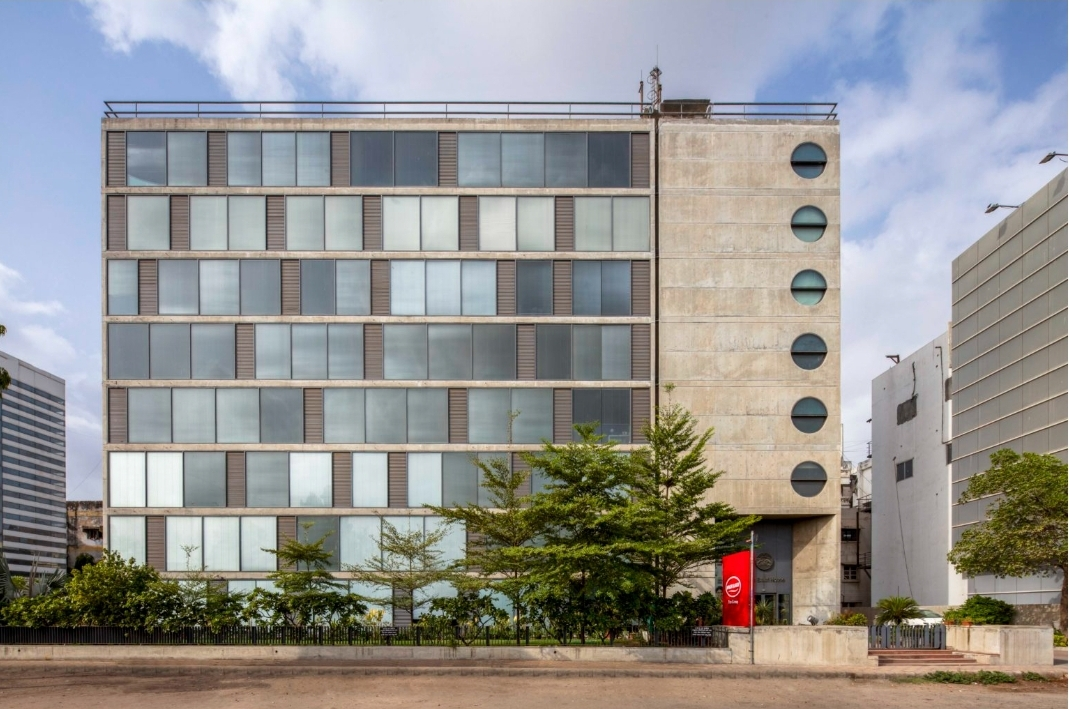
- Headquarters in Ahmedabad
- Type: Private
- Industry: Food and beverages
- Founded: 1915; 111 years ago (Ahmedabad) as Gujarat Tea Processors & Packers Ltd
- Founder: Narandas Desai
- Successor: Wagh Bakri Tea Group
- Headquarters: Ahmedabad, Gujarat, India
- Key people: Piyush Desai, chairman & managing director; Parag Desai, executive director
- Products: Tea, flavored tea
- Number of employees: 1,000–5,000
- Website: www.waghbakritea.com

Gujarat Tea Processors & Packers Ltd (d/b/a Wagh Bakri tea group) is an Indian multinational FMCG company, headquartered in Ahmedabad. The company was founded on September 22, 1980.

According to report by Forbes India GTPPL is the third-largest packaged tea company in India. It markets regular leaf, dust, and flavored tea under its major brand. GTPPL leads the market share in Gujarat at 70%, where its flagship brand 'Wagh Bakri' ranks 7th in the national market. The company also offers other brands including Good Morning, Mili, and Navchetan.

The company owns and operates fifteen tea lounges across the country. Additionally, its products are sold in the US, Canada, the Middle East, Europe, Australia, New Zealand, Fiji, Malaysia and Singapore. Exports contributed to about 5% of the total sales of the company as of March 2021.

== History ==
In 1915, businessperson Narandas Desai returned to India after gaining experience in the tea business. Desai was responsible for tending to a tea garden in South Africa of felicitates. Upon his return to India, Desai created Gujarat Tea Depot Co., which was established soon after.

In 1934, the ‘Wagh Bakri’ brand was born. Before then, 'Wagh Bakri' was referred to as Gujarat Tea Depot Co. The company was renamed to Gujarat Tea Processors & Packers Ltd. Wagh is Gujarati for tiger, and Bakri is goat. The tiger represents the upper class, whereas the goat represents the lower class, drinking tea from the same cup. It symbolizes harmony and shows how tea is a great leveler. Gujarat Tea Processors & Packers Ltd launched the ‘Wagh Bakri’ Tea brand in Rajasthan, Madhya Pradesh, and other states in India.

It was between 2007 and 2009, when ‘Wagh Bakri’ Tea brand was launched in the states of Maharashtra, Delhi, Uttar Pradesh, and NCR (National Capital Region) India. The company also launched of a Tea Lounge under the brand name ‘Wagh Bakri Tea Lounge’ in Mumbai. Wagh Bakri Tea Lounge serves variety of flavored tea and snacks. Taking the lounge facility further, Wagh Bakri Tea Lounge was launched in Delhi. The company launched another Tea Lounge at Bharat Diamond Bourse in Mumbai, Maharashtra. On 23 October 2023, Parag Desai, executive director, died due to a brain haemorrhage caused by injuries sustained during a fall outside his house.

== Operations ==
The company processes and packs tea leaves from a tea factory located in Kheda District, Gujarat, India and has its head office based in Ahmedabad City, Gujarat. Packaged tea is distributed through a supply chain and a distributor network.

== Awards ==
The Tea Group got an award named the Generational Legacy Award for Outstanding Contribution to the Indian Economy by Hurun India in October 2024. They were given by the Hurun India Family Business Awards in India.

== Gallery ==
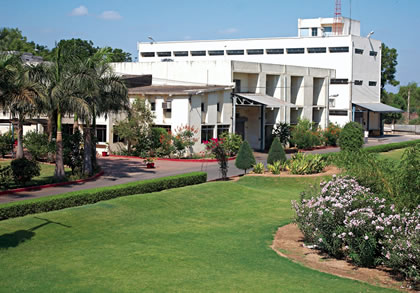
Wagh Bakri Tea Factory at Dholka

== See also ==
- History of tea in India
