= The Mail (Madras) =

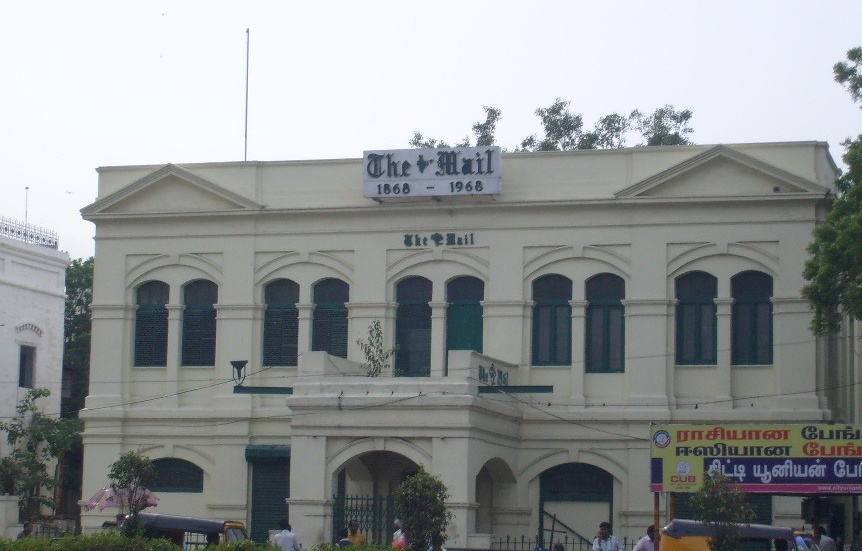
Office of The Mail in Anna Salai, Chennai

The Mail, known as The Madras Mail till 1928, was an English-language daily evening newspaper published in the Madras Presidency (later Madras State, and then, Tamil Nadu) from 1868 to 1981. It was the first evening newspaper in India which is now operating as a news and media website.

== History ==
The Madras Mail was started by two journalists, Charles Lawson and Henry Cornish on 14 December 1868. Lawson and Cornish had earlier served as editors in The Madras Times before resigning from editorship after a tiff-off with Gantz & Sons which owned the newspaper. Soon, the Madras Mail emerged as a formidable rival to both The Madras Times as well as The Hindu.

In 1921, the newspaper was purchased by European businessman John Oakshott Robinson who added it to his business conglomerate. In 1945, the newspaper was purchased by Indian business magnate S. Anantharamakrishnan and the paper was owned by Anantharamakrishnan and his family till its liquidation in 1981.
