= Batliboi =

Indian engineering company

Batliboi Limited
- Company type: Public
- Traded as: BSE: 522004
- Founded: 1892; 134 years ago
- Founder: Jehangir Framji Batliboi
- Headquarters: Surat and Bangalore, India
- Key people: Nirmal Bhogilal (Chairman & MD)
- Website: batliboi.com

Batliboi Ltd is one of the oldest Indian engineering companies, founded in 1892. The company is involved in Machine Tools, Textile Air Engineering, Textile Machinery, Air Conditioning, Environmental Engineering, Wind Energy, Electrical Engineering, and International Marketing and Logistics. Batliboi Ltd. has been registered in Bombay Stock Exchange.

== History ==
It was founded by Jehangir Framji Batliboi. In 1916, the company was acquired by Bhogilal Leherchand, a diamond trader. It went public in 1978.
