= Darashaw =

Indian Financial Services company

Darashaw & Co. Pvt, Ltd.
- Company type: Private
- Industry: Stock broker
- Founded: 1926; 100 years ago
- Founder: Mr. Darashaw Master
- Headquarters: Mumbai, Maharashtra, India
- Key people: Mr Darashaw K Mehta, Managing Director
- Website: Official Website

Darashaw & Co. Pvt. Ltd. is an Indian brokering and investment banking company founded in 1926. The company was historically the sole broker to the Nizam of Hyderabad, a significant player in the capital markets at the time. The company is headquartered in Mumbai and operates 13 regional offices across India.

Darashaw is active in the Indian Debt Market and maintains a dedicated desk for handling debt-related transactions. The company's business structure is organized into Pan-national Strategic Business Units. Darashaw offers Retirement Benefit Services, which include payroll outsourcing, retirement benefits investment intermediation, advisory, fund management, and consulting.
