= Chelpark =

Indian stationery company

Chelpark Company Private Ltd.
- Type: Subsidiary (1943–69); Private limited
- Industry: Stationery
- Founded: 1943; 83 years ago
- Founder: Chellaram family in association with Parker Pen
- Headquarters: Bangalore, India
- Products: Fountain pens, inks

Chelpark Company Private Limited is an Indian stationery manufacturing company based in Bangalore. Chelpark is one of the oldest manufacturers of fountain pen ink in the country.

Originally a subsidiary of the Parker Pen Company in India, the company was renamed 'Chelpark', after the Bangalore-based Chellaram family took over operations. The Moti and Sona were Chelpark's most notable fountain pens.

== History ==
Chelpark started as the Indian subsidiary of Parker Pen Company. Parker in partnership with TTK Group, sold fountain pen ink in India. After the Parker Pen Company discontinued its partnership with the TTK in 1943, they needed someone to handle its Indian subsidiary. The Chellaram family, who already traded in Parker products in west Africa, were asked to take over operations in India. The Chellaram family agreed on condition that they would take no part in the company's operational management.

After Parker agreed to the terms, both companies started gaving a local identity to the Quink Parker ink by renaming it. An advertising campaign was launched that showed the Parker label being replaced by Chelpark label. Chelpark promoted its brand primarily through on-ground advertising, including school essay contests, teacher demonstrations and campus activities.

In 1969, due to changes in policies by the Indian Ministry of Finance, the partnership came to an end. Parker sold its entire share in the operation as it was deemed unprofitable. Chelpark also started expanding to other office stationery products. After the Chellaram family acquired the majority shares, the business was rebranded as "Chelpark Company Limited". In 1985, it became "Chelpark Company Private Limited" and the head office shifted from Madras to Bengaluru.

In 2010s, Chelpark stopped manufacturing pens and inks. It was due to low demand for fountain pens and inks. There is no clear date regarding when Chelpark products stopped selling fountain pens.

== Reception ==
According to Harish Bijoor, a brand expert, Chelpark's success is often attributed to the quality of its ink and pen nibs. Their ink was known for being anti-clogging and non-corrosive, appealing to a wide range of users, from professionals to students.

== See also ==
- Parker Pen Company
