= Aravind Laboratories =

Indian cosmetic manufacturing company

- Industry: Cosmetic
- Founded: 1938; 88 years ago in Triplicane, Madras Presidency, British India
- Founder: K. Vasudevan
- Headquarters: Chennai, Tamil Nadu, India
- Area served: India
- Key people: K. Vasudevan (Founder and chairman); R. Rajagopal (MD); D. Hari Prasad (MD)
- Products: Eyetex, Saandhu, Kanmai, 11-in-one
- Brands: Eyetex, Eyetex Dazller, Dazller Eterna, Pallavi, Divyaa and Poornima
- Number of employees: 1,400 (2012)

Aravind Laboratories is an Indian cosmetic manufacturing company, founded in 1938. It is based in Chennai, Tamil Nadu, India. The company is known for its Eyetex range of cosmetics.

== History ==
The company was started with a small store in Triplicane in 1938 by K. Vasudevan, an assistant to Carnatic singer M.S. Subbulakshmi. Vasudevan started making Kajal (Kohl) under the name of Eyetex brand. In its initial days, the company manufactured Kajal and Kumkum liquid in glass bottles. It manufactured kanmai, a shiny, jet-black substance that was used to accentuate the eyewash first sold at Pushpavanam Stores in Triplicane, Tamil Nadu. Vasudevan also made saandhu, a deep-red liquid used to draw bindis. The company was acquired by A.V. Srinivasan, a chemist in 1958. The company set up its first manufacturing unit in Ramapuram in 1968, where its factory is currently located, as of April 2016. In 1981, the 11-in-one, one of Aravind's popular products, was launched. The product consists of 11 colours of liquid saandhu packed in a circular box. In 2002, the company began selling colour cosmetics like eyeliner, nail polish, lipstick, mascara, face-wash, scrub and lip gel, under the brand-name Dazller. They contribute 45% of Aravind's turnover. Aravind Laboratories garnered a turnover of ₹24.50 crore (US$3 million) in the year 2007. The company also claims for introducing the 'buy one get one free' marketing strategy to market the product by selling a 2-in-1 pack for the price of one, as reported by The Hindu Business Line. Eyetex was the cosmetic partner of Star Plus's dance reality show, Nach Baliye of season 9 in 2019.
