= Khimji Poonja Freight Forwarders =

Customs house agency in India

Khimji Poonja Freight Forwarders Pvt Ltd
- Company type: Private
- Industry: Freight Forwarding
- Founded: 1922
- Headquarters: Mumbai, India
- Key people: Dilip Mulani
- Website: khimjipoonja.com

Khimji Poonja Freight Forwarders Pvt. Ltd. is an established custom house agency and a freight forwarding company based out of Mumbai, India. The company provides customs clearing services along with other allied logistics like Air and Sea freight forwarding, Surface Transport, Insurance, Warehousing and door to door delivery of goods. Khimji Poonja also assists its clients in all aspects of International transportation encompassing import and export Sea freight, Airfreight, Heavy lifts, Break bulk and all allied services.

== History ==
- 1922: The company was set up and registered in 1922 by Mr. Khimji Poonja. The company dealt in cotton, oil seeds, bullion then.
- 1946: In 1946, the company established a clearing and forwarding department which is now one of the leading contributors to the company's activities.

== Affiliations ==
- Khimji Poonja has met the professional standards of the International Air Transport Association (IATA)
- Khimji Poonja has been approved as an Individual Member of International Federation of Freight Forwarders Associations (FIATA)
- Khimji Poonja is the Member of The Bombay Custom House Agents Association (BCHAA)
- Khimji Poonja has been approved as an Associate Member for Federation of Freight Forwarders Associations in India (FFFAI)
- Khimji Poonja is an Active Member of The Air Cargo Agents Association of India (ACAAI)
- Khimji Poonja is the Member of the Bombay Chamber of Commerce and Industry (BCCI)

== Certification ==
Khimji Poonja received an ISO Standard 9001:2008 certification by ISOQAR till 22 November 2013 for their Quality Management System.

== See also ==
- Freight Forwarder
