= Godavari Biorefineries =

Indian sugar manufacturer

Godavari Biorefineries Limited
- Company type: Public
- Traded as: NSE: GODAVARIB; BSE: 544279
- Founded: 1956
- Headquarters: Mumbai, India
- Area served: India
- Key people: Samir Somaiya (Chairman and Managing Director)
- Website: Godavaribiorefineries.com

Godavari Biorefineries Limited, formerly The Godavari Sugar Mills Ltd, is an Indian company which operates two sugar refineries and manufactures more than 20 products from renewable resources.

== History ==
On Oct 2024, the company have raised ₹166 crore (US$17 million) from anchor investors, one day ahead of the IPO. The company opened its initial public offering (IPO) in 23 Oct 2024 with total size of ₹555 crore. The offering consists of a fresh issue of equity shares worth ₹325 crore and an Offer-for-Sale (OFS) of 65.27 lakh shares valued at ₹230 crore by promoters and an investor.

In December 2024, the company has signed an international licence agreement with US based company Catalyxx Inc., to get the exclusive rights in utilising advanced technology for converting ethanol into biobutanol and other higher alcohols.

On Jan 2025, according to the SEBI Regulations, the company has received ₹93 crore (US$9.7 million) as the Demand Notice received for Non-Payment of Goods and Service Tax (GST) on clearance of Extra Neutral Alcohol (ENA) for the period from Jul 2017 to Mar 2021. The Authority demand ₹46.84 crore as non-payment of GST and ₹ 46.84 as penalty.

== Financials ==
Year	Revenue (in crores)	Profit/loss (in crores)	Ref.
FY 2023	₹1,686.67	12.30 ▲	
FY 2024	₹1,870.25	23.41 ▼	
