= ULJK Group =

Indian Financial services company

ULJK GROUP
- Company type: Public
- Industry: Financial Service, Real Estate Advisory
- Founded: 1903 in Mumbai, Maharashtra, India
- Headquarters: Mumbai, Maharashtra, India
- Key people: Madhavi Umesh Vora (chairperson)
- Products: Institutional Trading; Real Estate Advisory; Institutional Research; Investment Banking Advisory; Portfolio Management; Mutual Funds; Derivatives; Arbitrage
- Number of employees: 100
- Website: uljk.in

ULJK Group is a Financial Institution Company, located at Bombay Stock Exchange (BSE), Dalal Street, Kala Ghoda, Mumbai (formerly Bombay), Maharashtra, India. The company was established in the year 1903. The group name ULJK stands for the four generations who contributed in creating and developing the organization – Umesh Vora, Laldas Vora, Jamnadas Vora and Khushaldas Vora.

== History ==
Based out of the Bombay Stock Exchange towers, ULJK GROUP has 113 years old history with respect to providing financial services and advisory. The company was established in the year 1903. Laldas Vora, late partner was the President of Bombay Stock Exchange for 9 years and had contributed in overseeing the construction of the Bombay Stock Exchange Tower. ULJK Group is now in its 5th family generation of serving the financial services community.

== Corporate overview ==
=== Subsidiaries ===
ULJK Group has a number of subsidiaries. These are listed below:

- ULJK Securities Pvt. Ltd. (BSE & Category I Merchant Banker)
- ULJK Financial Services Pvt Ltd (NSE)
- ULJK Commodities Pvt. Ltd. (MCX)

=== Headquarters ===
ULJK's headquarters is located in Stock Exchange Towers (Bombay Stock Exchange), Dalal Street, Fort, Mumbai.

=== Board of directors ===
As of January 2017, the board of directors have the following members:

- Madhavi Umesh Vora – Chairperson

== Products and services ==
- Institutional Trading
- Real Estate Advisory
- Institutional Research
- Investment Banking
- Portfolio Management
- Mutual Funds
- Derivatives
- Arbitrage
