= C. Hayavadana Rao =

Indian polyglot

Rao Bahadur Conjeevaram Hayavadana Rao
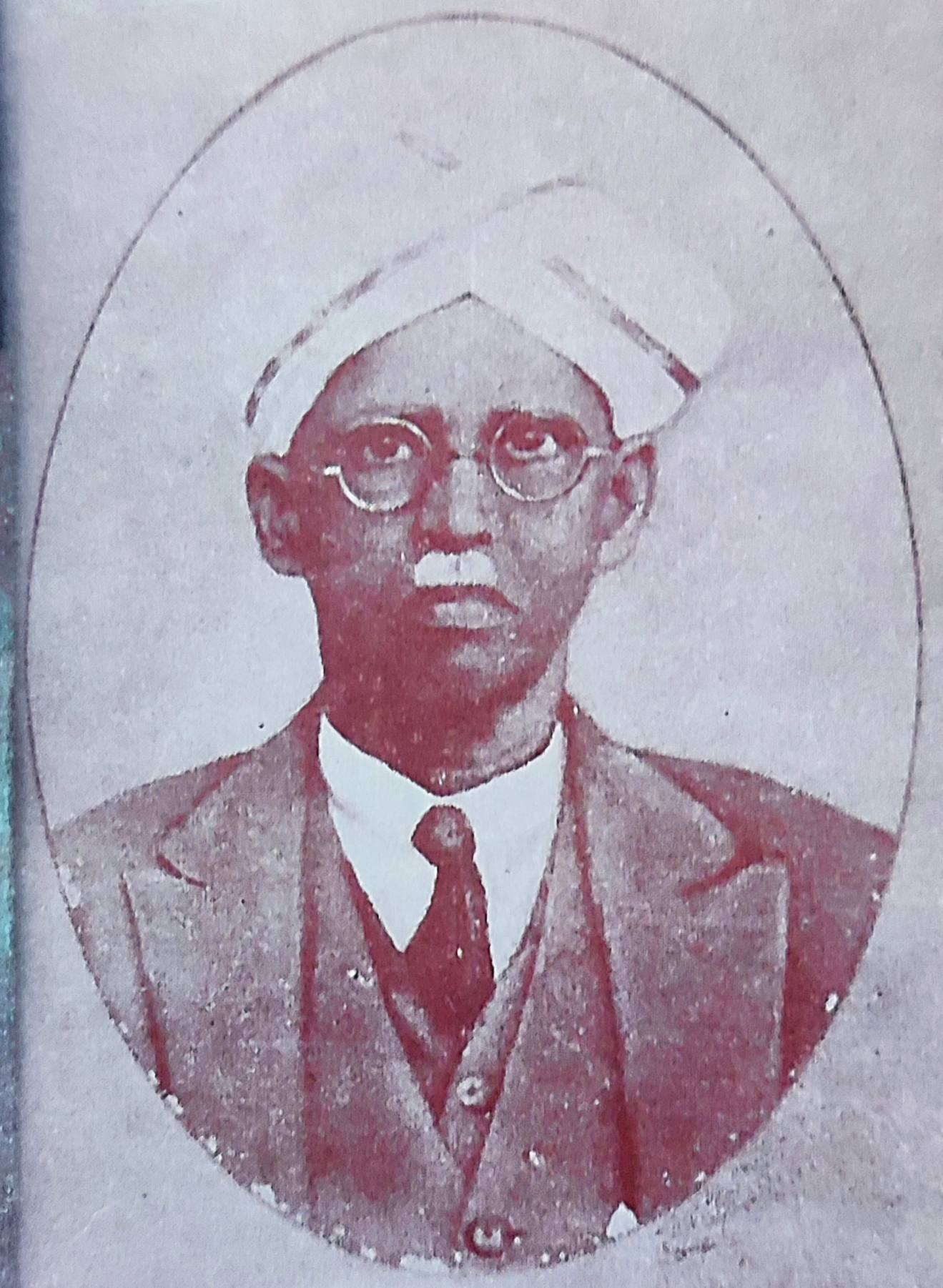
- Born: 10 July 1865; Hosur, Salem District, British India
- Died: 27 January 1946 (aged 80); Bangalore, Mysore kingdom
- Occupations: Historian, anthropologist, economist

Rao Bahadur Conjeevaram Hayavadana Rao (10 July 1865 – 27 January 1946) was an Indian historian, museologist, anthropologist, economist and polyglot. He was a member of the Royal Anthropological Institute, Indian Historical Records Commission and a fellow of the Royal Society of Economics. A road near Ashram Citcle (Basavanagudi), Bengaluru "Sri Hayavadana Rao Road" is named in his honour.

== Early life ==
Hayavadana Rao was born on 10 July 1865 in the town of Hosur in the then Salem district of Madras Presidency in a Kannada-speaking family. After graduating in history, Rao studied law and economics and joined the Government Museum, Madras as a curator. Rao worked as a curator till his retirement and compiled "The Indian Biographical Dictionary". Rao was a polyglot and was fluent in English, Latin, French, German, Kannada, Tamil, Telugu, Marathi and Sanskrit.

== Mysore Kingdom ==
In 1924, Rao was appointed the head of a committee formed to revise the Mysore Gazetteer written by B. L. Rice. The revised version comprising seven volumes was published in 1927. Rao followed this with a three-volume History of Mysore (1399-1799) chronicling the Wodeyar Dynasty.

== Later life and death ==
Rao died on 27 January 1946 in Bangalore.

== Works ==
- Rao, C. Hayavadana (1910). New Indian tales: nineteen amusing and instructive tales. G. A. Natesan.
- Rao, C. Hayavadana (1915). The Indian Biographical Dictionary .
- Rao, C. Hayavadana (1931). Indian caste system: A study.
- Rao, C. Hayavadana (1936). The Dasara in Mysore: Its Origin and Significance.
- Rao, C. Hayavadana (1948). History of Mysore (1399-1799 A.D.). Government Press.

== References and sources ==
Sources

- "HAYAVADANA RAO C., 1865-1946". classicalkannada.org. Archived from the original on 30 March 2012.
