= Tractors and Farm Equipment Limited =

Tractor manufacturer in Chennai, India

Tractors and Farm Equipment Limited (TAFE)
- Type: Privately held company
- Industry: Agricultural machinery
- Founded: 1960
- Founder: S. Anantharamakrishnan
- Headquarters: Chennai, Tamil Nadu, India
- Area served: Worldwide
- Key people: Mallika Srinivasan (Chairman); Lakshmi Venu (Vice Chairman); Sandeep Sinha (CEO)
- Products: Tractors; Diesel Engines; Diesel generators Hydraulic pumps Hydraulic cylinders Farm equipments Engineering plastics Plantations
- Brands: Massey Ferguson India, Eicher Tractors, TAFE Tractors, TMTL-Eicher Engines, TAFE Power
- Number of employees: 5000-10,000
- Parent: Amalgamations Group
- Subsidiaries: TAFE Motors and Tractors Limited (TMTL)
- Website: www.tafe.com

Tractors and Farm Equipment Limited (TAFE) (/ˈtæfeɪ/) is an Indian agricultural machinery manufacturer based in Chennai, India. TAFE is one of the largest tractor manufacturer in the world and the second largest in India by volume.

== Description ==
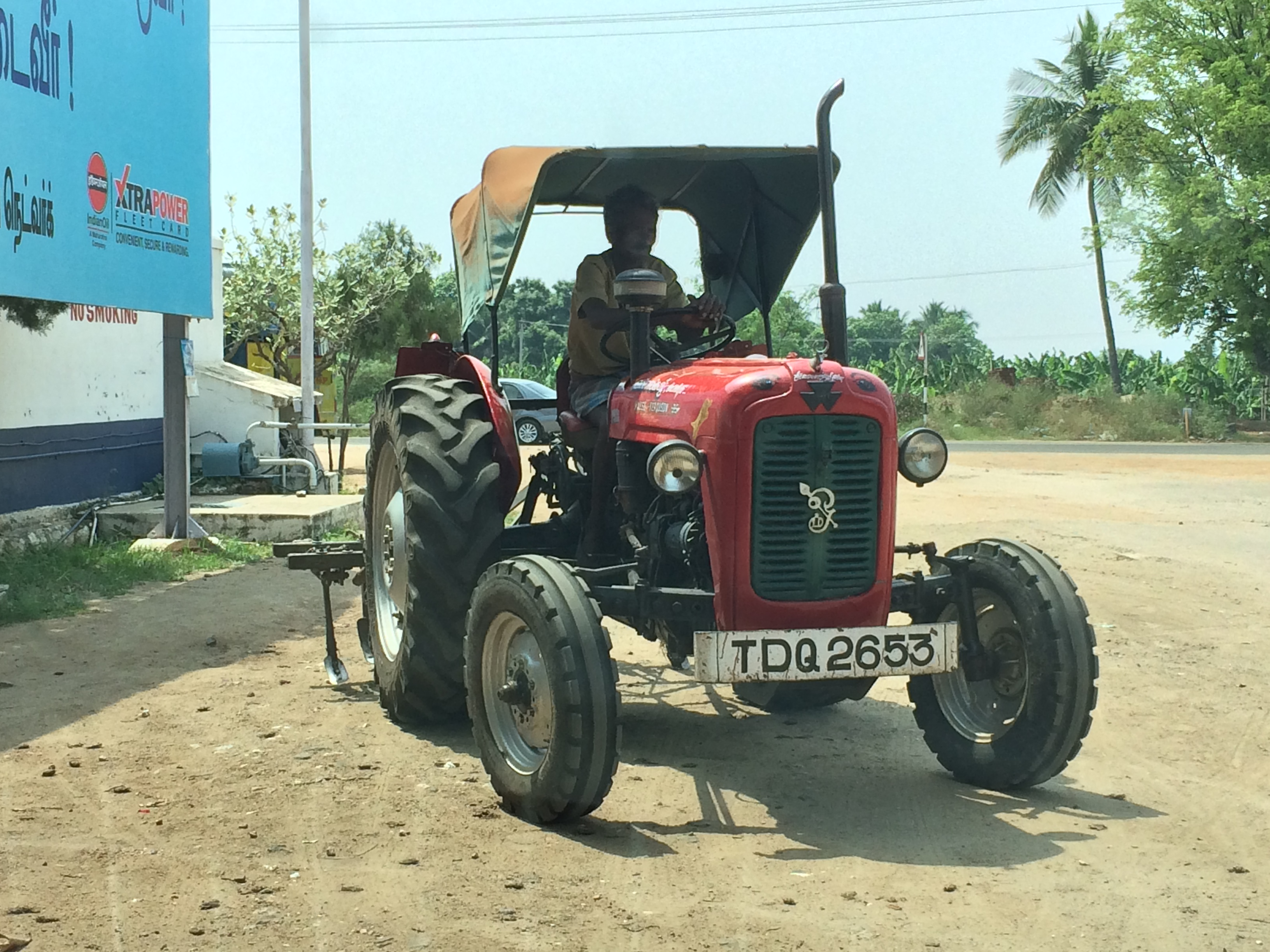
The long time best selling TAFE Massey Ferguson 25hp model

TAFE – Tractors and Farm Equipment Limited, is an Indian tractor manufacturer incorporated in 1960 at Chennai, with an annual turnover excess of INR 13,700 crores. One of the largest tractor manufacturer in the world and the second largest in India by volumes, TAFE wields about 25% market share of the Indian tractor industry with a sale of over 200,000 tractors (domestic and international) annually. TAFE is also a significant shareholder in AGCO Corporation, USA – an $14.4 billion US tractor and agricultural equipment manufacturer.

TAFE has a distribution network of over 1600 dealers which sells its tractors under four brands – Massey Ferguson India, TAFE Tractors, Eicher Tractors and IMT. TAFE exports tractors, and independently, for use in farms in over 80 countries all over the world.

Besides tractors, TAFE and its subsidiaries have business interests in areas such as farm-machinery, diesel engines and gensets, engineering plastics, gears and transmission components, hydraulic pumps and cylinders, passenger vehicle franchises and plantations.

== Manufacturing ==
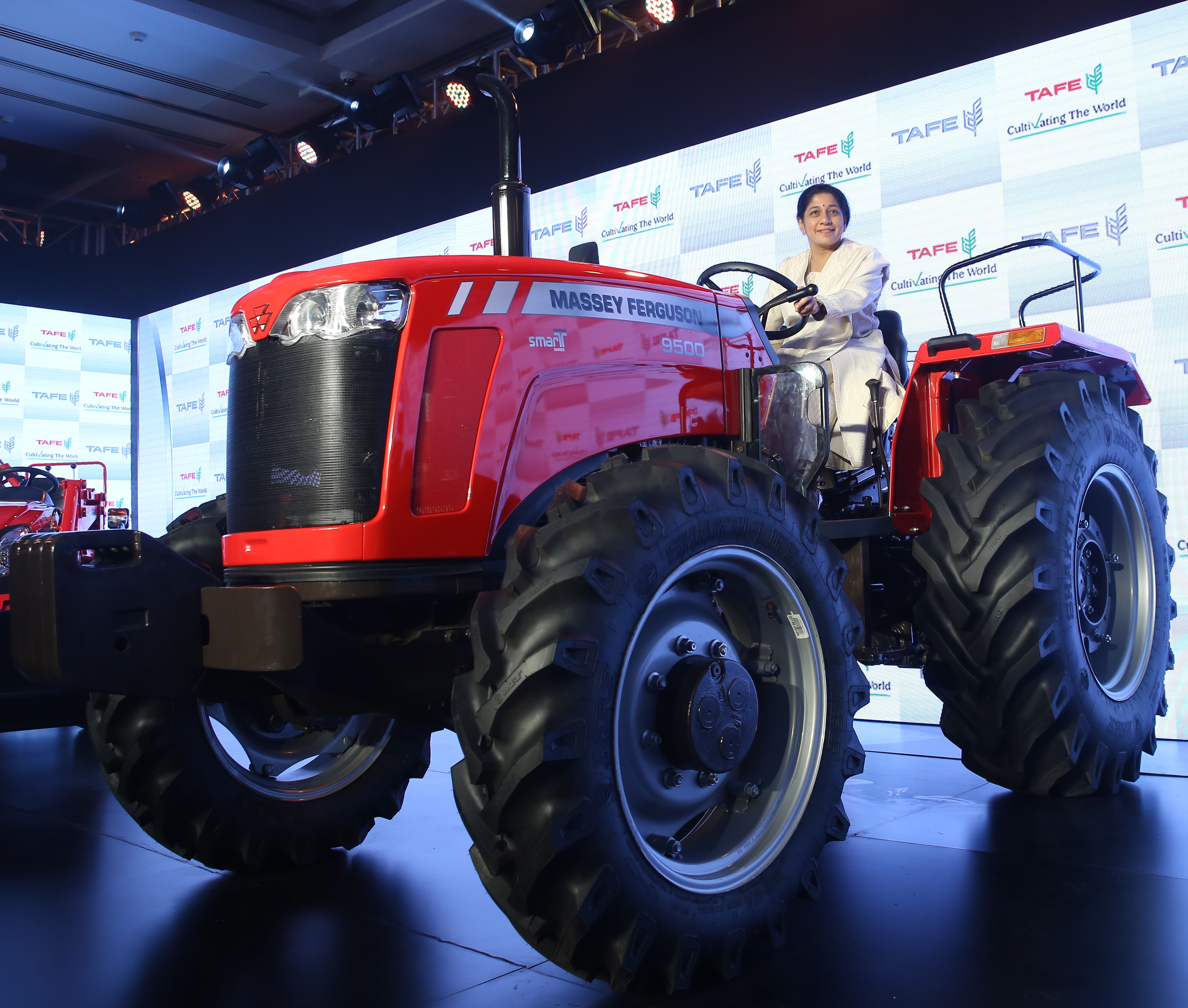
TAFE Chairman and CEO Mallika Srinivasan on a MF 9500 SMART tractor in 2016

TAFE's plant at Turkey manufactures Stage 5 tractors for the Turkey market. TAFE acquired Eicher's tractors, gears and transmission components and engines business in 2005 through a wholly owned subsidiary, TAFE Motors and Tractors Limited (TMTL). With six tractor plants, an engines plant, two gears and transmission components plants, two engineering plastics units, two facilities for hydraulic pumps and cylinders, and a batteries plant besides other facilities. Recently TAFE acquired Faurecia's Indian Interior Business of Group FORVIA - The French Global Automotive Supplier, in December 2022. TAFE employs over 3,500 engineers, as well as a number of specialists in other disciplines.

TAFE is a part of The Amalgamations Group based at Chennai, one of India's largest light engineering groups, comprising 40 companies, involved in the design, development and manufacture of diesel engines, automobile components, light engineering goods, plantations and services.

=== Joint manufacturing ===
To enhance and complete the extensive range of engines produced by the Deutz AG across emission standards for both domestic and export markets, TAFE Motors and Tractors and Deutz AG will work together to jointly manufacture 30,000 engines in the 2.2L (50-75 hp) and 2.9 L (75-100 hp) displacements under license at TAFE Motors' manufacturing facility in Alwar, Rajasthan.

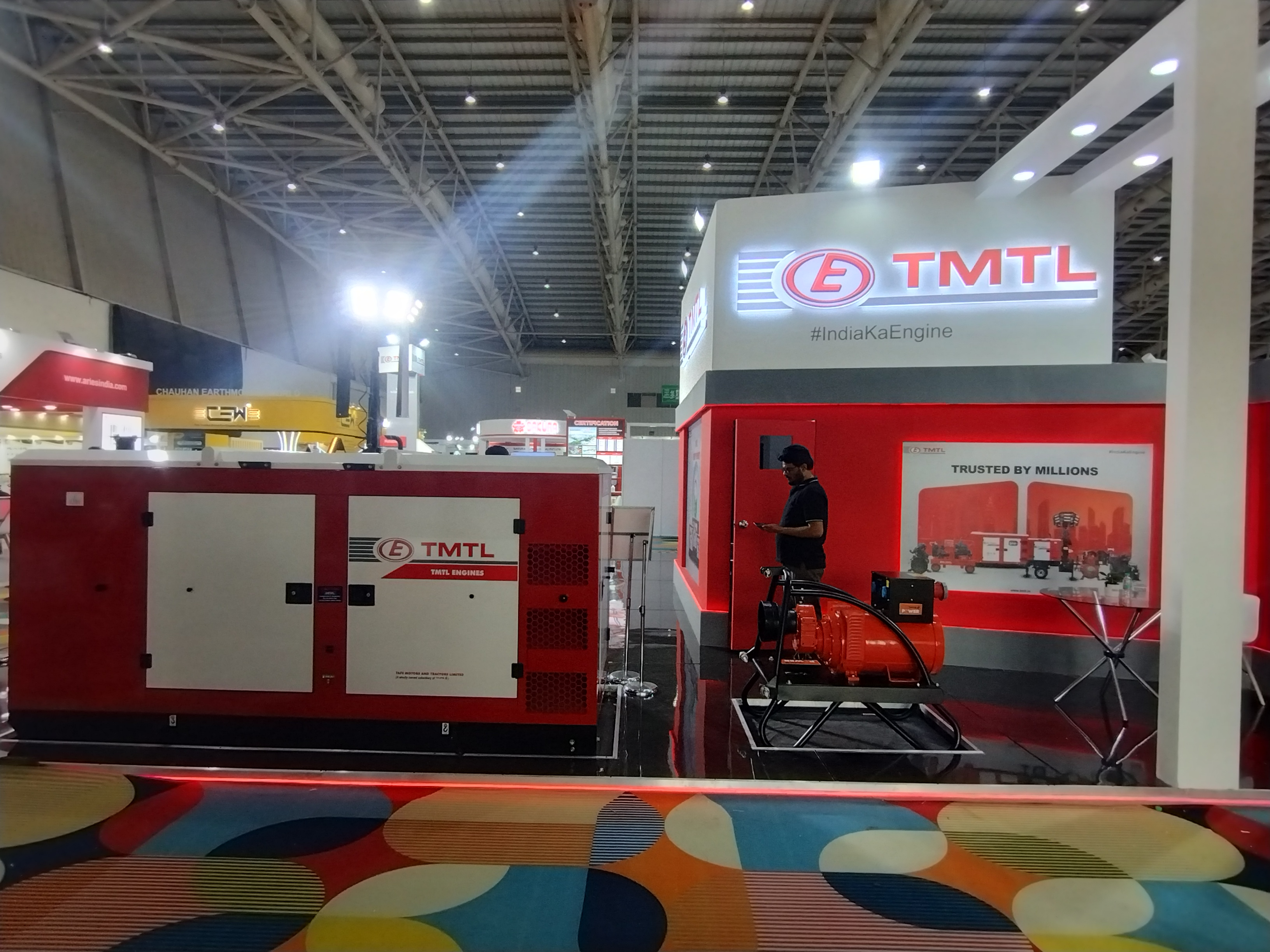
TAFE Motors and Tractors Ltd. (TMTL) at EXCON 2025, BIEC

== See also ==
- Tractor manufacturers of India
