= Kerala Soaps =

Soap manufacturer

Kerala Soaps and Oil. Kozhikode
- Founded: 2010
- Headquarters: Nadakkavu, Kozhikode, Kerala, India
- Products: Kerala Sandal, Thrill, Vep, Kairali, Coaltar, Washwell.
- Parent: Kerala State Industrial Enterprises Limited
- Website: keralasoaps.net

Kerala Soaps is a state-owned soap-manufacturing company in the state of Kerala, India, producing the erstwhile brands, manufactured by Kerala Soaps and Oils Limited. The company was founded in 1914, and reconstituted as a state-owned company in 1963 in the Kozhikode district of Kerala. The company operates as a subsidiary of Kerala State Industrial Enterprises Limited. After four decades of operation, the company was locked down in 2002 owing to heavy losses, and in a general atmosphere of state divestment.

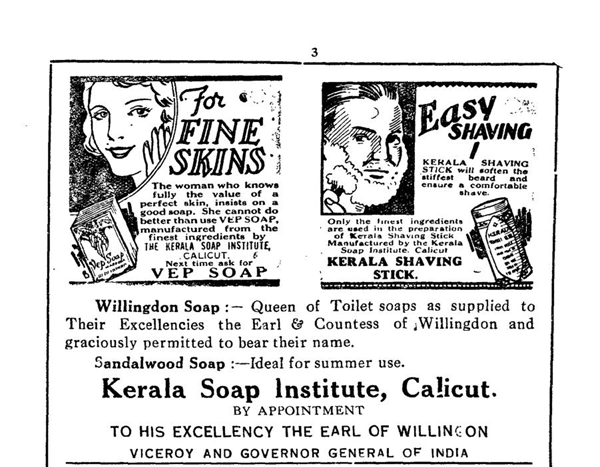
An advertisement of Kerala Soap Institute, Calicut from 1937

After remaining closed for eight years, aimed at tapping on the popularity of its legacy brands, operations restarted on 1 January 2010, under a new management. The original company Kerala Soaps and Oils Limited was known for its legacy brands, including Kerala Sandal, a bathing bar made of sandalwood extract harvested from the forest of Kerala.
