= S. Anantharamakrishnan =

Indian businessman (1905–1964)

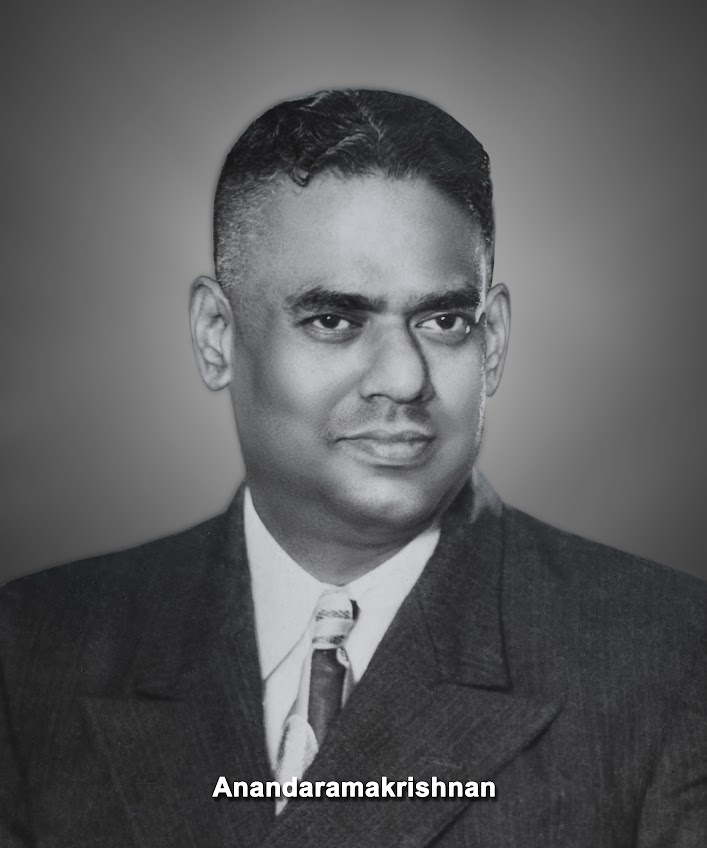
- Born: 1905; Alwarkurichi, Tinnevely District, Madras Presidency, British India (present day Tirunelveli, Tamil Nadu, India)
- Died: 18 April 1964 (aged 58–59); Madras, Madras State (present day Tamil Nadu), India
- Occupation: Businessman
- Children: 4 (incl. A. Sivasailam)

Sivasailam Anantharamakrishnan (1905 – 18 April 1964), affectionately called J, was an Indian industrialist and business tycoon who founded and led the Amalgamations Group of industries from 1945 to 1964.

Anantharamakrishnan was born in Tirunelveli in 1905 and had his education in Tirunelveli and Madras. In 1935, he joined the Simpson Group as a secretary and in 1938, became the first Indian director in the management of Simpson Group. He served as the Chairman of the Group from 1953 till his death in 1964.

Anantharamakrishnan is remembered for his successful business practices, efficient management of the labour unions and for triggering the growth of the automobile industry of Chennai which has earned the city the epithet "Detroit of India". As a result, he himself came to be remembered as the "Henry Ford of South India".

== Early life ==
Anantharamakrishnan was born in Alwarkurichi Village of Ambasamudram Taluk in Tirunelveli District on 11 November 1905. He had his schooling at Government High School, Tirunelveli and graduated from Government College of Commerce in Madras. In 1930, he joined Fraser and Ross Limited as an accountant.

== Early years with Simpson and Co ==
Anantharamakrishnan joined Simpsons Group, a British-owned South Indian business conglomerate as Secretary in 1935. He became one of the three directors and the only Indian director (the other two being European) in the board of Simpsons group when Sir Alexander MacDougall, Chairman of Simpson's, and W. W. Ladden, managing director of the company founded a holding company in 1938. Anantharamakrishnan's induction marked the partial Indianization of Simpsons group which was, till then, completely owned by Europeans. The very next year, it was converted into a public limited company. This eventually became the Amalgamations Group in 1941. Anantharamakrishnan, also called "J", was responsible for the rapid expansion of the Amalgamations group in the 1940s. Anantharamakrishnan took over Amalgamations Group in 1945, though he officially became its Chairman only in 1953.

== Expansion of the Amalgamations Group ==
In 1922, John Oakshott Robinson of Spencer's had purchased the Madras newspaper The Madras Mail and the Higginbotham's and merged the companies with his printing company Associated Printers and the Spencer's to form the Associated Publishers. In 1945, Anantharamakrishnan purchased Associated Publishers on behalf of Amalgamations and added the new companies to the group. According to popular Chennai historian S. Muthiah, the successful takeover was the result of an overheard conversation at a Hotel Connemara. This takeover is regarded as over of the biggest business deals of post-colonial Madras.

During the period 1938–1955, the group also promoted a finance company called Simpson and General Finance, an advertising company (Madras Advertising Company), Wheel-Precision Forgings, Speed-a-way and Wallaces Castwright. Amco Batteries was acquired in year 1955. India Piston was established in 1949. This company produces pistons, piston rings, piston pins and cylinder liners. Addison Paints and Chemicals was established in 1947. With Indian independence and Indianization of commercial establishments in the country, the Europeans in the board left handing the company to Indians. Consequently, Anantharamakrishnan became the Chairman of the Amalgamations group in 1953.

Anantharamakrishnan died an untimely death on 18 April 1964 at the age of fifty-nine.

== Commemoration and legacy ==
Anantharamakrishnan is highly regarded for his business acumen and is credited with a large-scale increase in the production of automobiles in Chennai city that have earned Chennai, the epithet "Detroit of India". A former employee, in an interview, recounted that Anantharamakrishnan was strongly against the use of political lobbying in order to secure business interests.

Former President of India, R. Venkataraman, regarded the Simpson Group Worker's Union as one of the best organized worker's unions. Anantharamakrishna is, himself, known to have authored a 6-page publication titled "Industrial disputes — How to prevent them".

A book on Anantharamakrishnan was released during his birth centenary on 12 November 2005 by former Supreme Court of India judge Ratnavel Pandian in the presence of his sons, A. Sivasailam and A. Krishnamoorthy.

The Anantharamakrishan Prize and the Anantharamakrishnan Memorial Lecture have been instituted by the Amalgamations Group in his honor.

== Publications ==
- Anantharamakrishnan, S. (1956). Industrial disputes — How to prevent them.
