= Biecco Lawrie =

Defunct public sector undertaking

- Type: Public sector undertaking
- Industry: Petroleum; Electricity
- Predecessor: British India Electric Construction Co
- Founded: 1919; 107 years ago in Calcutta, British India
- Defunct: 10 August 2018
- Fate: Shut down
- Headquarters: Kolkata, West Bengal, India
- Owner: Oil Industry Development Board (OIDB); Government of India
- Number of employees: 275 (2018)

Biecco Lawrie Co. Limited (BLL) was an Indian public sector undertaking under the ownership of the Ministry of Petroleum and Natural Gas, Government of India, headquartered in Kolkata. It was originally established in 1919 as British India Electric Construction Company Limited.

== History ==
The company was originally established in 1919 in Calcutta, British India as the British India Electric Construction Company (BIECCO). It began as a manufacturer of tea garden machinery and also produced shell cases, food containers, and camouflage sets for the military during World War II. In 1932, the company started producing affordable fans for the public.

== Service ==
BLL ran four business operations—switchgear manufacturing, electrical repair, projects division, and lubricating oil blending and filling facility.

The company had a lubricating oil blending plant with an annual capacity of 12,000 kilolitres. Additionally, the company manufactured switchgears and also untertook small power distribution projects, while also marketing products such as kerosene, paraffin wax, bitumen, and furnace oil. It also had a separate turnkey project and electrical repair division.

As of fiscal 2007, the company incurred aggregated revenue of ₹525 million (US$5.6 million).

== Shut down ==
The company has over a decade accumulated ₹ 153.95 crore loss, with negative net worth of ₹ 78.88 crore at the end of the FY 2017–18. On 10 October 2018, the Government of India decided to shut down Biecco Lawrie after approval by the Cabinet Committee on Economic Affairs (CCEA). Its employees were given Voluntary Retirement Scheme (VRS) / Voluntary Separation Scheme (VSS). Although the Ministry of Petroleum and Natural Gas had made attempts to revive the company by selling, oil companies refused to buy the firm. 67.33 per cent stake of the company is held by Oil Industry Development Board (OIDB) and 32.33 per cent is with the government. The remaining 0.44 per cent shares are held by others.
