= J L Morison (India) =

Indian consumer goods company

J L Morison (India) Ltd
- Company type: Public
- Industry: Consumer goods
- Founded: 1934
- Headquarters: Mumbai
- Key people: Mr. Raghu Nandan Mody, Chairman, Mrs. Sakshi Mody, Promoter Director
- Products: Baby Care, Hair Care (bigen hair color), Oral care (emoform tooth paste)
- Parent: Rasoi Group

J L Morison (India) Ltd. is an FMCG company based in Mumbai, India. The company has three lines of products – baby care: Morisons Baby Dreams, hair dyes: Bigen and toothpaste for sensitive teeth: Emoform.

== Brands ==
Morisons Baby Dreams is the company's own flagship brand which has a range of baby products for babies from birth to 2 years. The categories include- feeding, hygiene, apparels, toys, mommy needs, grooming, baby gear.

Bigen is a hair colour brand owned by Hoyu company from Japan. JLM is licensee partner and exclusive manufacturer, distributor and marketer for the brand in India.

Emoform-R is a sensitive toothpaste brand owned by Switzerland-based Dr. Wild and Co. JLM is the licensee partner and exclusive manufacturer, distributor and marketer for the brand in India.

== Manufacturing ==
The company has a factory located in Waluj, Aurangabad which exclusively manufactures all the Bigen products for the India market and many products.

== Distribution ==
The company has four main channels of distribution- traditional trade, modern trade, e-commerce and Canteen Store Dept. These are serviced through a country-wide depot network.
