= Higginbotham's =

Indian publisher and bookseller

Coordinates: 13.0652°N 80.2664°E

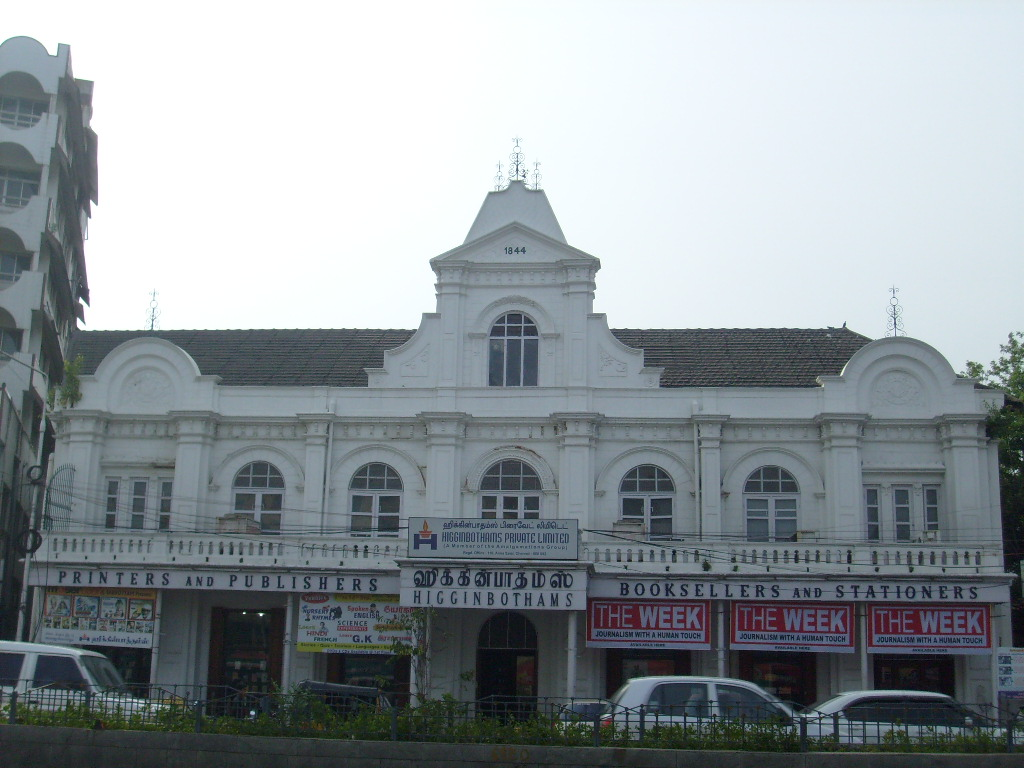
- The first Higginbotham's store in Anna Salai, Chennai.
- Type: Private
- Founded: Madras, Madras Presidency, British India (1844; 182 years ago)
- Founder: Abel Joshua Higginbotham
- Headquarters: Chennai, Tamil Nadu, India
- Number of locations: 22
- Area served: South India
- Parent: Amalgamations Group

Higginbotham's is an Indian bookstore chain and publisher based in the city of Chennai. The company's first bookstore at Mount Road, Chennai is India's oldest bookshop still in existence, founded in 1844. The company's second bookstore in Bangalore, located at M. G. Road, opened in 1905 and is the oldest existing bookstore in the city. Since 1949, Higginbotham's has been owned by the Amalgamations Group. In the late 19th century, the company published books under the name Higginbotham & Co.

== History ==
An English librarian named Abel Joshua Higginbotham established Higginbotham's after reportedly arriving in India as a British stowaway. The captain of the ship ejected him from the ship at Madras port, after he was discovered on board. In the 1840s, he found employment as a librarian with a bookstore named Wesleyan Book Shop run by Protestant missionaries. However, the store suffered heavy losses and the missionaries who ran the business decided to sell their shop for a low price. Higginbotham purchased the business, set up his own store and called it "Higginbotham's" in the year 1844. Higginbotham's is, therefore, India's oldest bookstore in existence. It soon gained a reputation for quality. John Murray, in his Guidebook to the Presidencies of Madras and Bombay in 1859, describes Higginbotham's as the "premier bookshop of Madras". In March 1859, in a letter to Lord Macaulay, Lord Trevelyan, the Governor of Madras wrote:

Among the many elusive and indescribable charms of life in Madras City, is the existence of my favourite book shop 'Higginbotham's' on Mount Road. In this bookshop I can see beautiful editions of the works of Socrates, Plato, Euripides, Aristophanes, Pindar, Horace, Petrarch, Tasso, Camoyens, Calderon and Racine. I can get the latest editions of Victor Hugo, the great French novelist. Amongst the German writers, I can have Schiller and Goethe. Altogether a delightful place for the casual browser and a serious book lover.

Higginbotham's started selling stationery and also publishing and printing their own books from the 1860s onwards. When the British Crown took over the governance of India from the British East India Company by the Queen's Proclamation of 1858, Higginbotham's printed copies of the Proclamation in English and Tamil and distributed them all over the Presidency. Higginbotham's were appointed as the "official booksellers to His Royal Highness, the Prince of Wales" during the latter's visit to India in 1875. Its first publication ‘Sweet Dishes: A little Treatise on Confectionary' by Wyvern, came out in 1884. Higginbotham's became official book-supplier to government and to various institutions, with different customers from British Prime Minister Clement Attlee (in office 1945–1951) to the last Maharaja of Mysore, Jayachamaraja Wodeyar. Abel Joshua Higginbotham served as the Sheriff of Madras in 1888 and 1889. From 1890 to 1920, Higginbotham's were the sole suppliers to the Connemara Public Library. James Higgs, who was the managing director from 1890 onwards, was a prominent Freemason who had previously served as the Grand Deacon of England and the Deputy District Grand Master of Master.

Higginbotham's was renamed Higginbotham & Co in 1888. Abel was Sheriff of Madras during 1888 and 1889. During this period, he involved his son C. H. Higginbotham in the business. On Abel's death in 1891, the firm passed on to the hands of his son C. H. Higginbotham. C. H. expanded the business beyond Madras, and across South India. Since 1944, Higginbotham bookstalls were established in many railway stations on the South Indian Railway and the Southern Mahratta Railway. In 1904, the company's diamond jubilee year, the bookstore shifted to its current location on Mount Road. The new bookstore was specifically built for the firm, and designed to house books. Its high, sloping roof provided improved air circulation, and very few windows were built to prevent dust from entering. In 1929, Higginbotham's had as many as 400 employees.

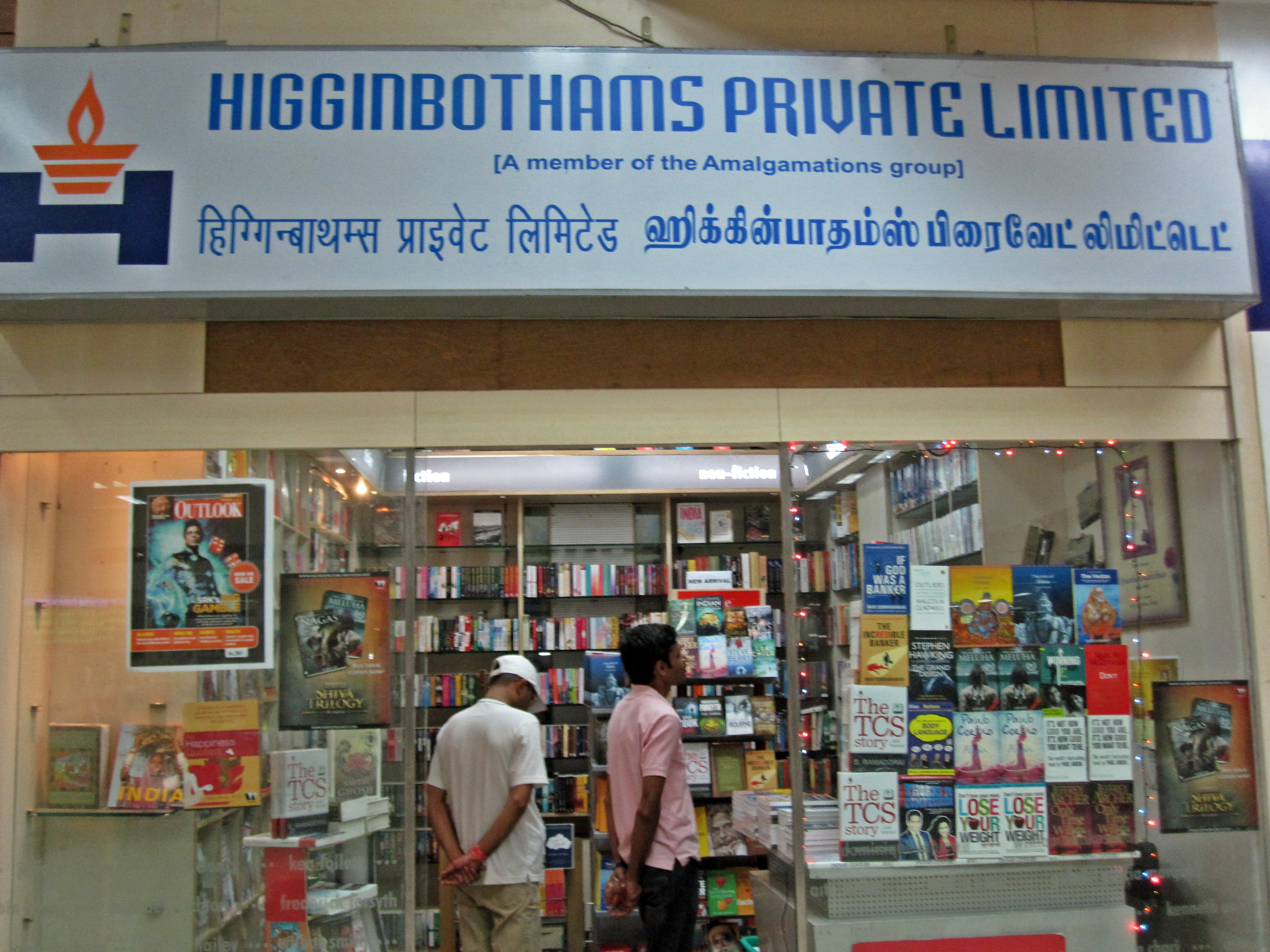
Higginbotham's store inside the Anna international terminal, Chennai Airport

Higginbotham's opened its first bookstore in Bangalore at M.G. Road (then known as South Parade) in 1905. The store was located in a two-storey Graeco-Roman-style building constructed in 1897. This is the oldest bookstore in existence in the city.

In 1925, John Oakshott Robinson of the Spencer's conglomerate purchased Higginbotham's, and merged the company with his printing firm Associated Printers, to establish Associated Publishers. Associated Publishers was acquired by S. Anantharamakrishnan of Amalgamations Group in 1945, and has remained a part of the conglomerate ever since. Some of Higginbotham's famous customers included Clement Attlee, Chakravarti Rajagopalachari and S. Radhakrishnan. Rev. Miller, a pioneer of the Madras Christian College, was another regular at Higginbotham's.

Higginbotham's was the largest bookstore in India until the 1990s. In 1989, renovations helped restore the original look to the Mount Road building.

In mid-2015, the Bangalore bookstore was closed for renovations to revamp its interiors. The store was re-opened in February 2017.

== Branches ==
Higginbothams has a chain of 22 outlets spread across the South Indian states of Tamil Nadu, Andhra Pradesh, Karnataka and Kerala.

== See also ==
- Heritage structures in Chennai
- A H Wheeler & Co
