= Amalgamations Group =

Indian conglomerate

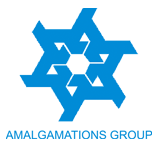
- Type: Public limited
- Industry: Conglomerate
- Founded: 1945; 81 years ago
- Founder: S. Anantharamakrishnan
- Headquarters: Chennai, Tamil Nadu, India
- Key people: A. Krishnamoorthy (Chairperson)
- Products: Tractors; Diesel engines; Automobile parts; Tea plantation; Retail stores
- Revenue: ₹83 billion (2020)
- Net income: ₹30.44 billion (2020)
- Number of employees: 12,000 (2016)
- Website: www.amalgamationsgroup.co.in

The Amalgamations Group, formerly called Simpson Group, is an Indian business conglomerate based in Chennai which has several business interests in Manufacturing Tractors, Automobile ancillaries, Plantation, Trading and services.

The group today has over 47 companies with 50 manufacturing plants.

== Businesses ==
The most notable businesses operated by the group are as follows:

- Tractors and Farm Equipment Limited
- Amco Batteries
- Simpsons & Company
- Bimetal Bearings
- India Pistons
- T. Stanes & Co
- Higginbotham's
- Addisons Paint

== History ==
The Amalgamations Group was established by S. Anantharamakrishnan who during the early 1940s was a Director at Simpsons & Co.

In 1945, he took over the management and later consolidated several British owned companies with interests in plantation, engineering, trading and services. According to popular Chennai-based historian S. Muthiah, the successful takeover was the result of an overheard conversation at a Hotel Connemara.
