= Ghulam Mohammad =

Ghulam Mohammad (Arabic: غلام محمد), also spelled Ghulam Mohammed, Ghulam Muhammad, Ghulam Muhammed, Gholam Mohammad, Gulam Mohammad etc., is a male Muslim given name popular in Afghanistan, Bangladesh and Pakistan. It may refer to:

- Nawab Sayyid Ghulam Muhammad Ali Khan I Bahadur (died 1825), twice Nawab of Banganapalle in India
- Ghulam Muhammad Khan (1763–1828), briefly Nawab of Rampur
- Ghulam Muhammad Sultan Sahib (1795–1872), son and heir of Tipu Sultan, the Indian warrior-emperor of Mysore
- Ghulam Muhammad Ghouse Khan (1824–1855), twelfth and last Nawab of the Carnatic
- Ghulam Muhammad Tarzi (1830–1900), Governor of Baluchistan
- Ghulam Muhammad Ali Khan (1882–1952), fifth Prince of Arcot
- Malik Ghulam Muhammad (1895–1956), Governor-General of Pakistan
- Ghulam Muhammad Ghobar (1897–1978), Afghan historian, journalist, political figure, and poet
- Ghulam Mohammad Farhad (1901–1984), Afghan engineer and Pashtun nationalist
- Ghulam Mohammad Khan (born 1927), Indian Parliamentarian from Moradabad
- Ghulam Mohammed (composer) (1903–1968), Indian film score composer
- Bakshi Ghulam Mohammad (1907–1972), Prime Minister of Jammu and Kashmir
- Ghulam Mohammed Sadiq (1912–1971), Prime Minister of Jammu and Kashmir
- Ghulam Mohammad Shah (1920–2009), Indian politician, Chief Minister of Jammu and Kashmir
- Ghulam Mohammad A. Fecto (1922–2007), founder and chairman of Fecto Group
- Gulam Mohammed Sheikh (born 1937), Indian painter, writer and art critic
- Ghulam Mohammad Saznawaz (died 2014), master of Kashmiri Sufiyana music
- Ghulam Muhammad Qasir (1944–1999), Pakistani poet
- Ghulam Muhammed Quader (born 1948), Bangladeshi minister
- Golam Mohammad Siraj (born 1950), Bangladeshi politician
- Ghulam Mohammed (politician) (born 1953), Indian politician
- Ghulam Mohammed Baloch (1959–2009), Baloch nationalist politician
- Gholam Mohammad Nousher (born 1964), Bangladeshi cricketer
- Golam Mohammad Hasibul Alam (born 1964), Bangladeshi civil servant
- Ghulam Mohammed Abdul Khader (died 1993), seventh prince of the House of Arcot
- Ghulam Muhammad Khan Mahar (died 1995), Pakistani politician
- Ghulam Muhammad Malik, Pakistani Lieutenant General, commander of the X Corps, Rawalpindi of the Pakistan Army
- Ghulam Muhammad Zaz (born 1941), musical instrument maker
- Ghulam Mohammad (cricketer, born 1976) (born 1976), Pakistani cricketer
- Ghulam Mohammad (cricketer, born 1898) (1898–1966), Pakistani cricketer
- Golam Mohammad, Bangladeshi major general
- Ghulam Muhammad (Gilgit-Baltistan politician), Pakistani politician
- Ghulam Mohammad Vastanvi (1950–2025), Indian Islamic scholar
- Ghulam Mohammad Sadiq, Pakistani Islamic scholar and politician

== See also ==
- Kot Ghulam Muhammad
- Ghulam Muhammad Abad
- Ghulam (disambiguation)
- Mohammad
