= Prince of Arcot =

Official Indian Noble Title

- أميرِ أركوٹ
- Imperial

Incumbent
- Nawab Muhammed Abdul Ali, the present Prince of Arcot
- Nawab Muhammed Abdul Ali since July 1993

Details
- Style: His Highness Serene Highness
- Heir apparent: Nawabzada Mohammed Asif Ali
- First monarch: Azim Jah, 1st Prince of Arcot
- Formed: 1867
- Residences: Amir Mahal, Chennai
- Website: Official website

The Prince of Arcot (also known as Amir-e-Arcot) is a hereditary and titular position held by the head of the House of Arcot, a noble Muslim family based in Chennai, Tamil Nadu, India. Although it holds no sovereign power, the title continues to carry ceremonial, religious, and cultural significance in South India.

== History ==
The Arcot title originates from the Nawab of the Carnatic dynasty. In 1855, following the death of Ghulam Muhammad Ghouse Khan without a male heir, the British East India Company annexed the Carnatic using the Doctrine of Lapse.

In 1867, Queen Victoria created the title of Prince of Arcot in favour of Azim Jah, a close relative of the Nawabs of the Carnatic, recognising his family’s long loyalty to the British Crown.

== List of Princes of Arcot ==
	Name	Reign	Notes
1	Azim Jah	1867 –1874	First Prince; granted title by Queen Victoria.
2	Sir Zahir-ud-Daula Bahadur	1874 – 1879	Eldest son of Azim Jah.
3	Intizam-ul-Mulk Bahadur	1879 – 1889	Younger brother of Zahir-ud-Daula.
4	Sir Muhammad Munawar Khan Bahadur	1889 – 1903	Died during the Delhi Durbar of 1903.
5	Ghulam Muhammad Ali Khan Bahadur	1903 – 1952	Held the title “His Highness”; active in civic bodies.
6	Ghulam Mohiuddin Khan Bahadur	1952 – 1969	Continued ceremonial functions.
7	Ghulam Mohammed Abdul Khader	1969 – 1993	Seventh Prince.
8	Muhammed Abdul Ali	1993 – present	Current Prince; noted for philanthropy and interfaith dialogue.

== Role and Recognition ==
Although the abolition of royal privileges in 1971 removed constitutional recognition for Indian princes, the Prince of Arcot continues to be regarded as a traditional community leader and a custodian of Muslim endowments in Tamil Nadu. The Prince oversees the Prince of Arcot Endowments, managing mosques, schools, and charitable trusts in India and abroad.

== Amir Mahal ==
The Prince resides at Amir Mahal in Chennai, a 19th-century Indo-Saracenic palace that continues to serve as the seat of the family.

== Legal status, controversies, and criticism ==
The legitimacy of continuing to use the title “Prince of Arcot” and the maintenance of his privileges have occasionally been subjects of public debate and legal scrutiny.

=== 2019 Madras High Court case ===
In 2019, a public interest litigation was filed before the Madras High Court seeking the withdrawal of the Prince’s title, pension, and government maintenance of Amir Mahal. The petitioner argued that such privileges contradicted the Constitution of India, especially after the 1971 abolition of princely recognition.

A Division Bench comprising Justices S. Manikumar and Subramonium Prasad dismissed the PIL, holding that:

- The Prince’s pension and privileges were administrative arrangements, not constitutional entitlements.
- The title’s continued ceremonial use did not violate Article 363A or any existing legal provision.
- The petition lacked merit and was “misconceived and without substance.”

=== Criticism and public debate ===
Scholars and commentators have periodically questioned whether hereditary titles such as “Prince of Arcot” align with the egalitarian principles of the Indian Republic. Critics argue that the continued government maintenance of Amir Mahal and payment of pensions may symbolically contradict the abolition of royal privileges.

However, supporters claim that the title is purely honorary and that the Prince’s social and charitable work justify limited government support for the upkeep of historical properties and endowments.

== See also ==
- Nawab of the Carnatic
- Amir Mahal
- Carnatic Wars
- Carnatic Sultanate
