= Thiru. Vi. Ka. Salai =

Main street in the downtown region of Chennai, Tamil Nadu, India

Thiru Vi Ka High Road
- General Patters Road, Westcott Road, Royapettah High Road
- Interactive map of Thiru Vi Ka High Road
- Maintained by: Corporation of Chennai
- Length: 2.17 mi (3.49 km)
- Location: Chennai, India
- Coordinates: 13.0507497°N 80.2683518°E
- North end: Anna Salai, Chennai
- South end: Lazarus Church Road, Mylapore, Chennai

Thiru Vi Ka Salai, or the Thiru Vi Ka High Road, is one of the main streets in the downtown region of Chennai, Tamil Nadu, India. Running from north to south, the street branches off of the arterial Anna Salai north of the LIC Building and ends at Luz Corner in Mylapore, continuing as the Ramakrishna Mutt Road. The street connects the neighbourhoods of Royapettah, Mylapore and Gopalapuram. The street includes three individual stretches formerly known as General Patters Road, Westcott Road and Royapettah High Road, respectively. The longest stretch, formerly known as the Royapettah High Road, runs to a length of 1.17 km (0.73 mi). The presence of numerous automobile dealers on the northern end of the street resulted in Chennai coming to be known as The Detroit of India.

== History ==
The original Woodlands Hotel was located on Royapettah High Road, whose garden space is presently occupied by a namesake cinema complex. The street is also known for the presence of princely properties of the Arcot Nawab family, including the Amir Mahal and Acharya Graha. It is said that Amir Mahal and Acharya Graha were connected with a tunnel. The Acharya Graha housed the Regional Provident Fund office before the office was moved to its present premises on the same street. Previous owners of the Acharya Graha include Justice S. Subramania Aiyer, the Zamindar of Arni, and Congress associate T. M. Srinivasan. When it was owned by T. M. Srinivasan, the property had several Congress visitors including Mahatma Gandhi and Balgangadhar Tilak. Jammi Buildings, from which Jammi Pharmaceuticals, an outgrowth of the clinic and pharmacy established in Mylapore by Ayurvedic physician Jammi Venkataramanayya in 1928 known for its then popular household name 'Jammi Liver Cure', operated from 1949 till the 1980s, is one of the oldest landmarks on the street.

On the southern side of the street, the Sanskrit Academy was established in 1927 to promote Sanskrit learning. Several Sanskritic organisations, including the Madras Sanskrit College, were founded in the first quarter of the 20th century. In the 1950s, the Kuppuswami Sastri Research Institute was established, which now has about 50,000 books in Sanskrit and on Indology, besides 1000 olas (palm-leaf manuscripts) in Grantham, Tamil and Sanskrit. The Madras Law Journal, the oldest in South India, was established in the campus in 1891 and moved out in 2006–2007 when it was acquired by an international publisher. When the area west of the Madras Sanskrit College towards the southern part of the street, known as the Dhobi Ghat, was gifted in 1915, it became the permanent location of the Student's Home, a home for destitute boys founded in 1905 in a temporary location by C. Ramaswamy Aiyangar and C. Ramanujachari. In the 1920s, the home expanded to include a high school and a college.

By the middle of the 20th century, Anna Salai had become the hub of automobile manufacturers in South India, including conglomerates such as Simson, Addison Motor Company, Royal Enfield, South India Automotive Company, George Oaks of the Amalgamations Group, Standard Motor Products of India, and TVS Motor Company. This, coupled with low rental rates in the nearby streets, resulted in automobile spare manufacturers and dealers opening shops in the region, including Pudupet, Chintadripet, General Patters Road, Whites Road, State Bank Street and so forth. General Patters Road became the hub of automobile service and spare dealers. This resulted in the region coming to be called The Detroit of India. The stretch was also home to theaters such as Jayapradha and Melody.

On 19 October 1952, at the house of Telugu leader Bulusu Sambamurti, in a street off Royapettah High Road leading to the present-day Vidya Mandir School, Gandhian Potti Sriramulu embarked on a fast-unto-death, demanding the creation of a new Andhra state for the Telugu-speaking people, leading to the formation of the state of Andhra Pradesh the following year. The old tile-roofed house was later demolished to make way for a memorial for Potti Sriramulu.

== The street ==
Thiru Vi Ka Salai is connected with Anna Salai at the northern end. The northernmost stretch branching off Anna Salai on its eastern side and abutting the Express Estate was formerly known as General Patters Road, running to a length of 0.97 km. From then on, the street was known as the Royapettah High Road. The initial stretch of the Royapettah High Road was in turn known as the Westcott Road for the first 530 meters and the remaining 2 km as the Royapettah High Road. The street also has a flyover that connects the neighbourhoods of Royapettah and Mylapore. The southern end of the street is connected to the Kutchery Road at the Luz Corner Junction. Railway stations that are connected to the main street are the Thirumayilai railway station and the Mundagakanniamman Koil railway station of the Chennai MRTS, both near the southern end of the street. The Royapettah underground station of the Chennai Metro is under construction near the Government Royapettah Hospital at the northern side of the street.

=== Traffic junction ===
The five-road junction near the northern end of the Royapettah flyover, connecting Avvai Shanmugam Salai and Masilamani Street with the Royapettah High Road stretch of the Thiru Vi Ka Salai is a critical traffic junction on the street. The junction is one of the busiest in South Chennai owing to various factors such as being a bus route and the presence of several commercial establishments, headquarters of political parties, auto-gas filling stations, and a residential area. It is also one of the junctions with five arms, one of which leads to a residential colony.

== Major landmarks and memorials ==
The city's largest peripheral hospital, the 712-bed Government Royapettah Hospital, is located on the northern part of the street. Other important landmarks on the street include Sathyamurthi Bhavan (the headquarters of the Tamil Nadu Congress Committee), the historic Royapettah Police Station, Provident Fund office, Madras Sanskrit College, Valluvar Statue, and the Luz Anjaneya Temple.

The house where Potti Sriramulu fasted to death now stands as the Potti Sreeramulu Memorial Building, which promotes arts and culture and also houses a Telugu library.

== Development ==
Royapettah High Road is one of the major roads that are being developed under the phase I of the Mega Streets Project. In 2016, the Greater Chennai Corporation sent a proposal to the Tamil Nadu government on widening the road and began the work on preparation of land plan schedule.

== See also ==
- Transport in Chennai
