= Royapettah =

Neighbourhood, in Chennai district, in Tamil Nadu State, in India

- Neighbourhood
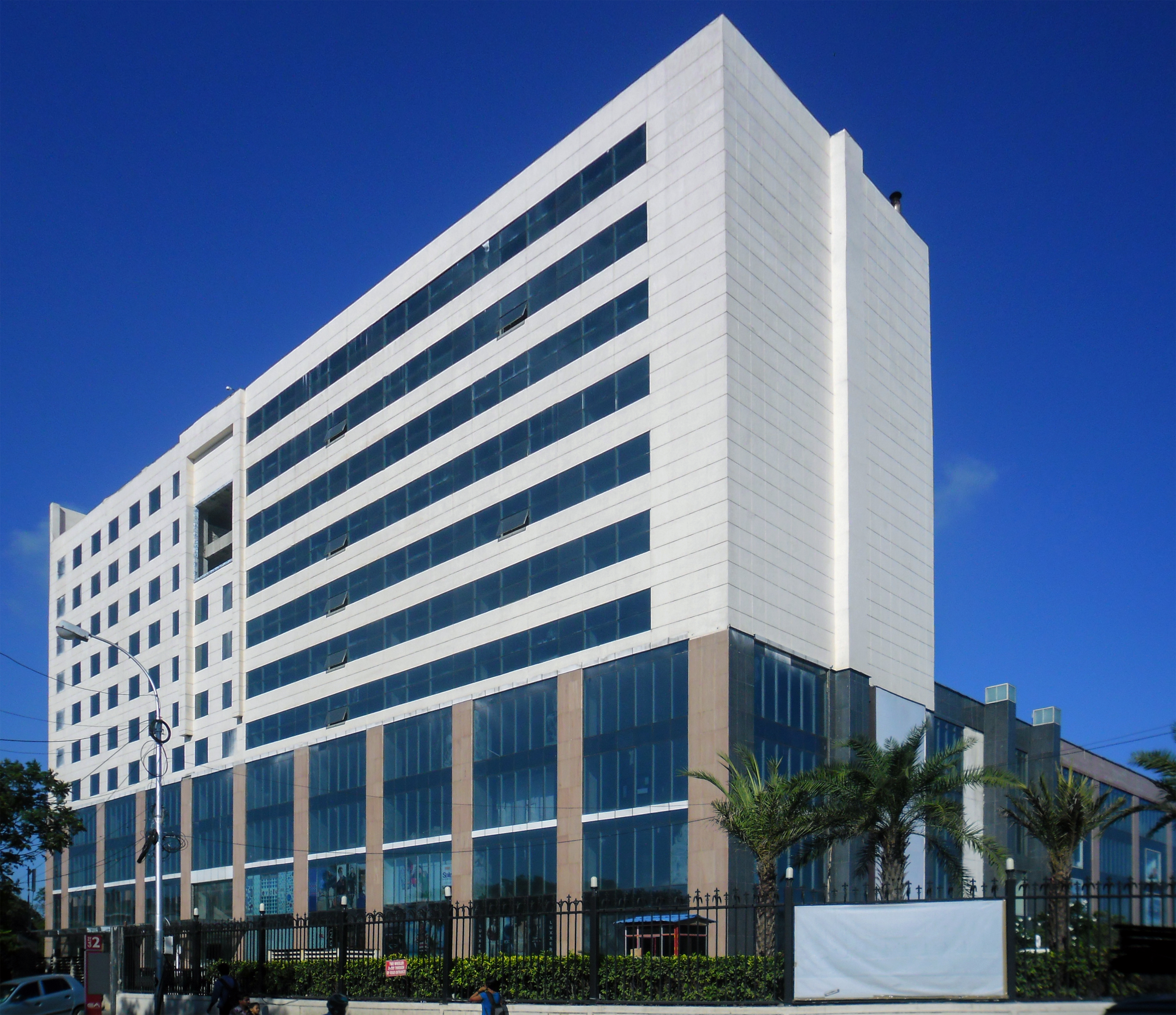
- Express Avenue

- Location within Chennai Location within Tamil Nadu Location within India
- Coordinates: 13°03′14.0″N 80°15′50.6″E
- Country: India
- State: Tamil Nadu
- District: Chennai
- Taluk: Egmore
- Metro: Chennai
- Zone & Ward: 9 & 118
- Elevation: 9 m (30 ft)

Population (2011)
  - Total: 14,912

Languages
  - Official: Tamil
- Time zone: UTC+5:30 (IST)
- PIN: 600014
- Telephone code: 044
- Vehicle registration: TN-06
- Civic agency: Greater Chennai Corporation
- Planning agency: CMDA
- City: Chennai
- LS: Chennai Central (Lok Sabha constituency)
- VS: Thousand Lights
- MP: Dayanidhi Maran
- MLA: Ezhilan Naganathan
- Website: http://www.chennaicorporation.gov.in/

Royapettah is a neighbourhood of Chennai, India.

== Location ==
Royapettah is located at the central part of the city of Chennai, with an elevation of 9 m (29 ft.) above mean sea level. The neighbourhood comes under Teynampet Zone (number 9) and ward number 118 (old number 112) of the Chennai Corporation.

Royapettah (Tamil Nadu)

=== Boundaries ===
Royapettah is bounded in the direction of Northwest by Nungambakkam, North by Chintadripet, Northeast by Chepauk, West by Gopalapuram, East by Triplicane, Southwest by Teynampet, South by Mylapore and Southeast by Marina Beach.

== History ==
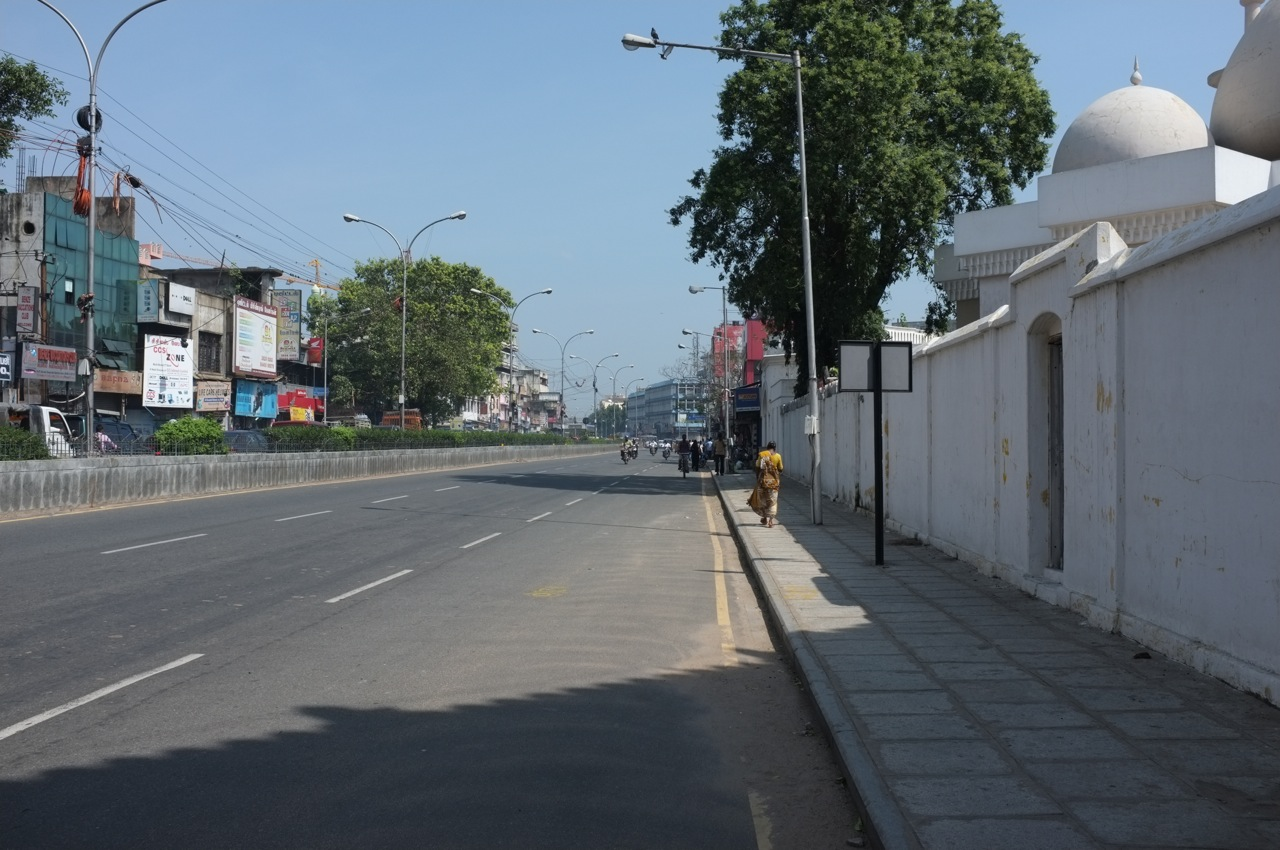
Anna Salai near the Thousand Lights Mosque

Royapettah, along with the suburbs of Nungambakkam and Teynampet, was part of the Great Choultry Plain, as the British had it in their records back in 1721. Soon after the arrival of the British in the city in the early 17th century, a large Eurasian population started settling in Royapettah and surrounding regions in the 17th and 18th centuries. Muslim settlements started appearing in the neighbourhood from the latter half of the 18th century. In 1798, the British East India Company constructed the Amir Mahal to house its administrative offices. When the Company annexed the Carnatic kingdom in 1855 with the Doctrine of Lapse, the Chepauk Palace, the official residence of the Nawabs, was auctioned off and purchased by the Madras government. The Nawab moved to a building called Shadi Mahal on Triplicane High Road and lived there. However, the British granted the Amir Mahal to the Prince of Arcot and the office building was soon converted into a palace by Robert Chrisholm. In 1876, the Nawab moved in with his family into the Amir Mahal, which has since been the residence of the Nawabs of Arcot.

The Purification Church was apparently the first church built in the neighbourhood around 1769. However, this was replaced in 1848 by the Presentation Church, also known as the Wallajahpet Church. This was built on a 21-ground plot granted by the Nawab in 1813. The Subramania Swamy Temple located adjacent to the church was built around 1889 in the area now known as Zam Bazaar. The Thousand Lights Mosque was built in 1810. In 1819, the first Methodist chapel in India was opened in Royapettah by the Methodist missionary James Lynch who settled down in the neighbourhood a year before. The church grew into the Wesley Church, which was dedicated in 1853.

In 1819, the Madras Eye Infirmary (MEI) was founded in the neighbourhood. It remains the oldest specialist eye hospital in Asia and the second oldest in the world. Modelled on Moorfields Eye Hospital in London, the hospital was moved to Egmore in 1884 and became the Government Ophthalmic Hospital in 1886. The Government Royapettah Hospital was opened in 1911. The first superintendent of the hospital was Col. C. Donovan.

In 1858, Monahan Girls' School, one of the oldest Protestant schools, was opened in Royapettah. In 1928, the neighbourhood had one of the earliest school for physical education in the Wesley School. The Royapettah post office appeared in 1834 as a subsidiary of the General Post Office at George Town. With the opening of the Woodlands Hotel in 1938 and the Modern Hindu Hotel on General Patter's Road, the neighbourhood became the home to the first Indian-style, vegetarian hotels in the city.

In the 1930s, a clock tower was built in the neighbourhood. Gani and Sons, formerly known as the South India Watch Company, provided the clock instrument for the clock tower.

By the middle of the 20th century, Anna Salai had become the hub of automobile manufacturers in South India, including conglomerates such as Simson, Addison Motor Company, Royal Enfield, South India Automotive Company, George Oaks of the Amalgamations Group, Standard Motor Products of India, and TVS Motor Company. This, coupled with low rental rates in the nearby streets, resulted in automobile spare manufacturers and dealers opening shops in the region, including Pudupet, Chintadripet, General Patters Road, Whites Road, State Bank Street and so forth. General Patters Road became the hub of automobile service and spare dealers. This resulted in the region coming to be called The Detroit of India.

== Demographics ==
As of Census of India 2011, the total population of Royapettah was 14,912, including 7,444 males and 7,468 females.

== Politics ==
Royapettah comes under the Thousand Lights Assembly constituency and the Chennai Central Lok Sabha constituency. The suburb hosts the headquarters of the All India Anna Dravida Munnetra Kazhagam, an Indian regional political party founded by the former chief minister of Tamil Nadu M. G. Ramachandran. The headquarters, known as the Puratchi Thalaivar M.G.R. Maaligai, is located at V. P. Raman Salai.

== Facilities ==
The Government Royapettah Hospital, which serves as the chief healthcare institution in the neighbourhood, is the city's largest peripheral hospital and its limit extends up to Chengalpattu. Second in the government sector next only to the Rajiv Gandhi Government General Hospital, the Royapettah Government Hospital has a full-fledged emergency department, including triage area, resuscitation bay and colour-coded zones, per the Tamil Nadu Accident and Emergency Care Initiative (TAEI) guidelines.

== Transportation ==
Located centrally within the city, Royapettah is well connected to other neighbourhoods of Chennai, with several bus routes passing through it. Whites road, Avvai Shanmugam Salai and Royapettah High Road are the primary streets in the neighbourhood. The city's arterial Anna Salai tangentially touches the western periphery of the neighbourhood. Royapettah has a flyover on Royapettah High Road. There are plans to build a 5-kl/day sewage treatment plant along the pliers of the flyover and is under construction.

Royapettah is served by the LIC and Thousand Lights metro stations on the Blue Line of the Chennai Metro, which runs along the western periphery of the neighbourhood. The Royapettah metro station on the Purple Line of the Chennai Metro is under construction.

== See also ==
- Neighbourhoods of Chennai
