= Muhammed Abdul Ali =

Nawab of the Carnatic in India (born 1951)

- Princes of Arcot

8th Prince of Arcot
- Reign: July 1993 – present
- Predecessor: Ghulam Mohammed Abdul Khader
- Born: August 9, 1951 (age 75); Arcot, Tamil Nadu, India
- Spouse: Sayeeda Begum
- Issue: Nawabzada Mohammed Asif Ali Nawabzada Mohammed Naser Ali
- House: House of Arcot
- Father: Ghulam Mohammed Abdul Khader
- Mother: Shamsunissa Begum
- Religion: Islam

Al-Hajj Nawab Ghulam Muhammad 'Abdu'l 'Ali Khan Bahadur; (born 9 August 1951) is the current and eighth titular Prince of Arcot and head of the House of Arcot in Tamil Nadu, India. He succeeded his father, Ghulam Mohammed Abdul Khader, as Prince in July 1993. Although the princely title is no longer legally recognised, it continues as a hereditary distinction acknowledged by the Government of India for ceremonial and cultural purposes.

== Early life and education ==
Muhammed Abdul Ali was born on 9 August 1951 in Arcot, Tamil Nadu, as the eldest son of Nawab Ghulam Mohammed Abdul Khader and Shamsunissa Begum.

He undertook the pilgrimage (Hajj) to Mecca in 1966, along with his family and staff, a notable religious journey in his youth.

== Accession ==
Following the death of his father in July 1993, Abdul Ali acceded as the eighth Prince of Arcot. His succession was ceremonially acknowledged at the family seat, Amir Mahal, in Chennai.

Under post-independence protocol, the Prince of Arcot retains a place in the Indian order of precedence roughly equivalent to that of a state cabinet minister, in recognition of historical standing.

== Public life ==
Abdul Ali has continued the family's tradition of civic and charitable engagement. He served twice as Sheriff of Madras (now Chennai), in 1984–85 and 1988–89.

He founded the organisation Harmony India in the early 1990s to promote communal amity, secularism, and national integration.

He also presides over the All India Muslim Educational Society (AIMES) and the Carnatic Family Association.

Abdul Ali oversees the "Prince of Arcot Endowments", which administers various mosques, charitable trusts, and religious properties in Tamil Nadu, as well as endowed properties in Mecca and Medina. The body operates under the "Prince of Arcot Endowment Act, 1922".

== Recognition and awards ==
In April 2023, the Indo-Australian Association of Chennai conferred upon him the Meritorious Service Award for promoting inter-faith harmony and communal peace.

In 2019, the Madras High Court dismissed a public interest litigation seeking to revoke his title and associated privileges, finding the title use and related facilities permissible under existing arrangements.

== Personal life ==
Muhammed Abdul Ali is married to Sayeeda Begum. They have two sons:

- Nawabzada Mohammed Asif Ali, the heir-apparent and current Dewan to the Prince of Arcot; and
- Nawabzada Mohammed Naser Ali.

He resides at Amir Mahal, Chennai, and is known for his interests in literature, art, and horticulture.

== Legacy ==
Although no longer a ruling figure in constitutional terms, Abdul Ali remains a prominent cultural and community leader in South India. He is consulted in inter-faith dialogues, heritage initiatives, and continues to represent the Carnatic nobility in ceremonial and philanthropic functions.

== See also ==
- Nawab of the Carnatic

Titles of nobility
Preceded by Ghulam Mohammed Abdul Khader	Prince of Arcot; 4 July 1993–present	Incumbent; Heir: Mohammed Asif Ali
