= Azim Jah =

- Amir of Arcot
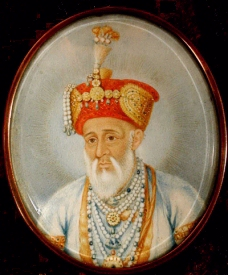
- Old Azim Jah

1st Prince of Arcot
- Reign: 1867 - 1874
- Predecessor: Ghulam Muhammad Ghouse Khan (As Nawab of Arcot)
- Successor: Zahir-ud-Daula
- Born: 1802
- Died: 1874 (aged 71–72)
- Religion: Islam

Azim Jah (27 May 1802 – 14 January 1874) was the brother of Azam Jah, the eleventh Nawab of the Carnatic and uncle of Ghulam Muhammad Ghouse Khan, the twelfth and last Nawab of the Carnatic. He held the title Nawab of Arcot from 1867 to 1874.

== Early life ==
Azim Jah was the younger brother of Azam Jah, the eleventh Nawab of the Carnatic. He became the heir-apparent and regent when Ghulam Muhammad Ghouse Khan succeeded Azam Jah on the former's death in 1825. Azim Jah served as the regent from 1825 to 1842 during Ghouse Khan's minority. In 1842, Ghouse Khan was formally installed as the monarch.

== Claim to the throne ==
Ghouse Khan ruled as the Nawab of the Carnatic from 1825 to 1855. On his death in 1855, the throne became vacant and in the absence of a legitimate male heir to Ghouse Khan, the state was formally annexed by the British according to the Doctrine of Lapse. Azim Jah protested claiming that he was the legitimate successor to the throne but met with little success.

== Assumption of the title "Amir-i-Arcot" ==
After protracted negotiations and court cases, finally, in 1867, Azim Jah was granted the title of Nawab of Arcot or Amir-i-Arcot by Queen Victoria and given a political pension. The Letters Patent issued by the Queen was formally presented to Azim Jah at a banquet held by the Governor of Madras on 12 April 1871.

As Kalas Mahal or the Chepauk Palace, the official residence of the princes of the Carnatic had been taken over by the British in 1859, Azim Jahn constructed a new residence, the Amir Mahal, in Royapettah.

== Death ==
Azim Jah died in 1874. He was succeeded to his title by his son Zahir-ud-Daula.

Preceded by Ghulam Muhammad Ghouse Khan (as the Nawab of the Carnatic till 1855)	Nawab of Arcot; 1867 - 1874	Succeeded by Zahir-ud-Daula
