= Sheriff of Madras =

Titular position of authority for a year

The Sheriff of Madras was an apolitical titular position of authority bestowed for one year on a prominent citizen of Madras. The post was abolished in 1998.

The position of Sheriff of Madras was created in the Madras Charter of 1726 which came into force on 17 August 1727. As the executive arm of the Jurisdiction the sheriff was sworn in for a period of one year to carry out such duties as the summoning of people to the High Court, the provision of jurors, the attaching and sealing of properties and, if required, the arranging of their auction. The sheriff had an office and staff and in the order of precedence ranked just below the mayor. From the mid-1800s the position lost its powers and responsibilities and became primarily ceremonial.

Mumbai (Bombay) and Kolkata (Calcutta) continue (2017) to maintain their similar posts.

== Some Sheriffs of Madras ==
- 1727 August Nicholas Morse, first sheriff
- 1746-53 No Sheriffs
- 1770 Hon Edward Monckton
- 1776 Hon Basil Cochrane
- 1779 William Jackson
- 1805 John Oakes
- 1824 John Savage
- 1828 George Lys
- 1831 Patrick Grant
- 1843-45 John Bruce Norton
- 1845: John Findley McKennie
- 1846 Leonard Cooper, solicitor (died 1852)
- 1854 Captain Christopher Biden
- 1885-86 John Henry Taylor
- 1886, 1887 Rajah Sir Savilai Ramaswamy Mudaliar, 158th Sheriff of Madras and first Indian Sheriff
- 1888, 1889 Abel Joshua Higginbotham, bookseller
- 1892 Pundi Runganadha Mudaliar, writer, educationist and politician
- 1893 Cawasji Edulji Panday, first Parsi Sheriff
- 1896 Nawab Syed Muhammad Bahadur, first Muslim Sheriff
- 1909 December 7 - Rao Bahadur M. Venkatasawmy Naidu Garu
- 1922 Muthiah Chettiar, banker
- 1924 December 20 to 1925 December 19 - Dewan Bahadur Saravana Bhavanandam Pillai, playwright
- 1925 December 20 - C.E.Wood
- 193n William Wallace Ladden, businessman
- 1933 Khan Bahadur Mohammed Musa Sait, businessman
- 1935 Ghulam Mohiuddin Khan Bahadur, 6th Prince of Arcot
- 1938 Ganapathi Agraharam Annadhurai Ayyar Natesan
- 1940 December 20 -Diwan Bahadur V. Shanmuga Mudaliyar
- 1949-50 R. Ramanathan Chettiar, member of Lok Sabha
- 1952 P.V.S. Vencatachellum, businessman
- 1955-56 R.E. Castell
- 1956-57 Mrs Mary Clubwala Jadhav
- 1960 C.S. Loganatha Mudhaliar, industrialist
- 1961 R.M. Dave, philanthropist and mayor
- 1964 T.S. Narayanaswami, industrialist
- 1967-1968 Maruthai Pillai, industrialist
- 1969-70 Anantharamakrishnan Sivasailam, industrialist
- 1973-74 A.M. Buhari, restaurateur
- 1974-75 Rangaswami Ramakrishnan
- 1978 A.B. Ananthakrishnan
- 1980-81 Dr.P.M.Rex Pinheiro.
- 1983 Sarojini Varadappan, social worker
- 1984-85 Nawab Muhammed Abdul Ali
- 1985-87 M. Saravanan (producer)
- 1988 Nawab Muhammed Abdul Ali
- 1989-91 Narayanaswami Srinivasan, industrialist
- 1992-93 Suresh Krishna, businessman
- 1997 K. Chockalingam, surgeon (last sheriff)

== See also ==
- Sheriff of Mumbai
- Sheriff of Kolkata
