= Zahir-ud-Daula =

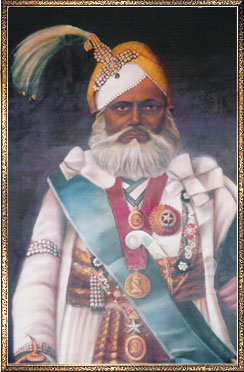
Zahir-ud-Daula Bahadur

Sir Zahir-ud-Daula Bahadur GCSI (died 16 June 1879) was the titular Nawab of Arcot from 1874 to 1879.

== Early life ==
Zahir-ud-Daula was the son of Azim Jah, the first Nawab of Arcot and cousin to Ghulam Muhammad Ghouse Khan, the twelfth and last Nawab of the Carnatic.

== Reign ==
Zahir-ud-Daula was recognized as the titular Nawab of Arcot or Amir-i-Arcot on the death of his father Azim Jah in 1874. In 1876, he moved the official residence to the Amir Mahal. He also participated in the Delhi Durbar of January 1877, during which the proclamation of Queen Victoria as the Empress of India was made. Zahir-ud-Daula was awarded the GCSI and the honour of a 15-gun salute.

== Death ==
Zahir-ud-Daula died in 1879 and was buried with state honours.

Preceded by Azim Jah	Nawab of Arcot; 1874 - 1879	Succeeded by Intizam-ul-Mulk
