= C. V. Karthik Narayanan =

Indian automotive industrialist and translator

C. V. Karthik Narayanan (1938–2017) was an Indian automotive industrialist and literary translator. He founded and oversaw Standard Motor Products of India, also known as STAMPRO, maker of the popular Standard marque of cars, including the iconic Standard, which he ultimately merged with the operations of A. C. Muthiah, in the process making Chennai a leading centre of ancillary automotive manufacturing and services, in an early iteration of 'Make in India'. In later life he was chairman of UCAL Automotive Services and a Director of TVS Group companies managed by Suresh Krishna.

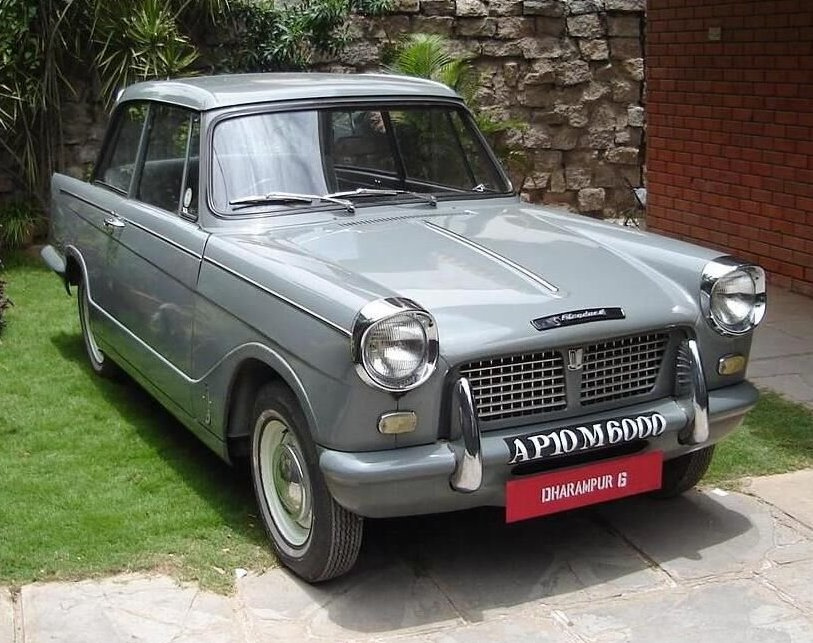
Example of a classic 1965 car of Standard marque, owned by the royal family of Dharampur

He served as both President of the Automotive Research Association of India and President of the Society of Indian Automobile Manufacturers, while playing a central role in the Confederation of Indian Industry as a member of its National Council and Chairman of its Southern Region subdivision (CIISR). He was also a member of the Institute of Engineering and Technology, a member of the Senate of Annamalai University, Trustee of the Music Academy and the Chatnath Trust, and Honorary Consul of Serbia.

He additionally translated Kalki's Ponniyin Selvan saga into English.
