= Muhammad Munawar Khan =

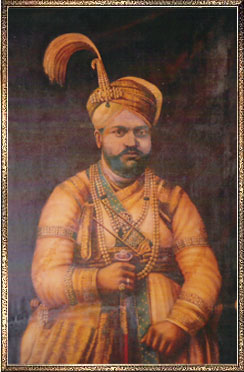
Muhammad Munawar Khan Bahadur

Sir Muhammad Munawar Ali Khan KCIE (died 3 January 1903) was the 4th Prince of Arcot from 1889 to 1903.

Muhammad Munawar Khan was the nephew of Intizam-ul-Mulk, the third Prince of Arcot, and succeeded his uncle in May 1889. The Prince of Arcot was the leader of the Muslim community of the Madras Presidency, a position including duties he ′zealously and jealously discharged′. He was made a Knight Commander of the Order of the Indian Empire (KCIE) in the 1897 Diamond Jubilee Honours. He was exempted from appearing in civil courts. Khan ruled until his death in early 1903, in Delhi while attending the 1903 Delhi Durbar to celebrate the coronation of King Edward VII. He was buried in Madras.

Khan was succeeded by his eldest son Ghulam Muhammad Ali Khan (1882–1952) as 5th Prince of Arcot, who was in turn succeeded by his brother Ghulam Mohiuddin Khan (1890–1969) as 6th Prince of Arcot.

Preceded by Intizam-ul-Mulk	Nawab of Arcot; 1889 - 1903	Succeeded by Ghulam Muhammad Ali Khan
