= Mary Clubwala Jadhav =

Indian philanthropist

Mary Jadhav MBE
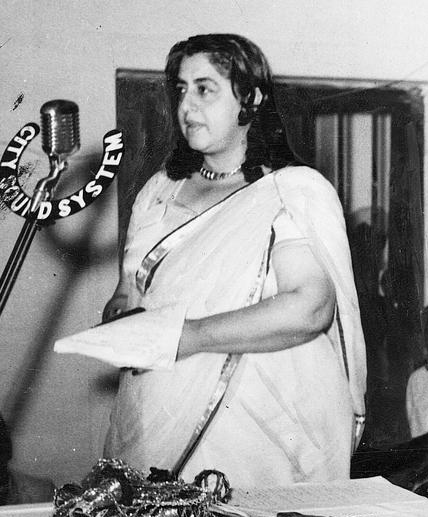
- Mary Clubwala Jadhav speaking at the VI Madras Annual State Conference of Social Work at Salem on 13 November 1954

Sheriff of Madras
- In office 1956 - 1957
- Preceded by: R.E. Castell
- Succeeded by: R.M. Dave

Personal details
- Born: Mary Patel; 10 June 1905 Ootacamund, Madras Presidency, British India
- Died: 1975 (aged 65–66) India
- Spouse(s): Nogi Clubwala; Major Chandrakant Jadhav
- Children: 1
- Parent(s): Rustom Patel (father); Allamai (mother)
- Occupation: Philanthropist
- Awards: Member of the Order of the British Empire (1941) Padma Shri (1955); Padma Bhushan (1968); Padma Vibhushan (1975)
- Nickname: The Darling of the Army

Mary Jadhav MBE (née Patel; 1909–1975), also known as Mary Clubwala Jadhav, was an Indian philanthropist who has been awarded Padma Shri and Padma Vibhushan, one of the India's highest civilian honors for her social work.

She founded many NGOs in Chennai and across India, and is often credited with setting up the oldest organized social-work bodies in the country. Her organization Guild of Service operates more than a dozen units related to orphanages, female literacy, the care and rehabilitation of disabled people, etc.

== Early life ==
Mary was born on 10 June 1909 in Ootacamund in the then Madras Presidency to Rustom Patel and Allamai, member of the 300-strong Parsi community of Madras city. She was schooled in Madras and married Nogi Clubwala at the age of 18. They had a son, Khusro, in 1930. Nogi Clubwala died due to an illness in 1935. After this she devoted herself to social work. She later remarried to Major Chandrakant K Jadhav, an Indian army officer who was also working in the same areas of social work.

== Activities ==
In 1942, with World War II raging, Clubwala founded the Indian Hospitality Committee with helpers drawn mostly from the Guild of Service. A large number of Indian troops were stationed in and around Madras and they had very few amenities. Mrs. Clubwala persuaded women from all communities and walks of life to join in the effort to organise mobile canteens, hospital visits, diversional therapy and entertainment programmes. The public donated generously to the War Fund started by the Hospitality Committee which continued its efforts after the War by helping ex-servicemen and their families rehabilitate themselves. The victorious 14th Army presented Mary a Japanese sword in appreciation of her tremendous efforts. Mrs. Clubwala was called "the Darling of the Army" by General Cariappa.

She started Madras School of Social work in 1952, the first school of social work in South India and second in India (after Tata Institute of Social Sciences-Mumbai). She was appointed Sheriff of Madras in succession to Mr. R. E. Castell for one year in 1956, and was the first woman to hold that office. She also honored the Duke of Edinburgh on his visit to Madras (now Chennai) in 1961.

On her 110th birth anniversary, Guild of Service announced that they'll release a book on her life and that of the guild.

== Awards ==
- Member of the Order of the British Empire (MBE) (1941 New Year Honours)
- Padma Shri (1955)
- Padma Bhushan (1968)
- Padma Vibhushan, the second highest civilian honor of India (1975).
