= Ulhas Bapat =

Indian musician (1950–2018)

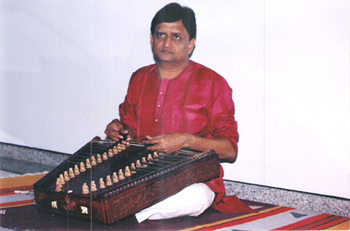
- Born: 31 August 1950
- Died: 4 January 2018 (aged 67); Mumbai
- Known for: Santoor

Pandit Ulhas Bapat (31 August 1950 – 4 January 2018) was a santoor player from India.

Bapat studied under Zarin Daruwala Sharma, K. G. Ginde and Wamanrao Sadolikar. In the film industry, he made his debut with R. D. Burman in the film Ghar in 1978 and continued playing for him until the film 1942: A Love Story.
