= Intizam-ul-Mulk =

Nawab Intizam-ul-Mulk Bahadur (died 16 May 1889) was the younger brother of Zahir-ud-Daula, the second Prince of Arcot. He succeeded his brother on his demise and ruled from 1879 to 1889.

== Reign ==
Intizam-ul-Mulk was the younger son of Azim Jah and the younger brother of Zahir-ud-Daula, the first and second Nawabs of Arcot. According to his father Azim Jah's wishes, Intizam-ul-Mulk succeeded Zahir-ud-Daula as Nawab in 1879.

Intizam-ul-Mulk reigned from 1879 to 1889. He was entitled to a 15-gun salute and was the last prince of Arcot to be exempted from appearance in civil courts.

Preceded by Zahir-ud-Daula	Nawab of Arcot; 1879 - 1889	Succeeded by Muhammad Munawar Khan
