= Bahar I Azam Jahi =

Persian chronicle

Bahar I Azam Jahi is a Persian pilgrimage chronicle, it is a compilation of various pieces of information by Ghulam Abdul Qadir Nazir. Azam Jah of the Carnatic appointed the author to record the events during his pilgrimage journey to the Nagore Dargah from Madras and return via Trichinopoly and Arcot. The pilgrimage was undertaken in 1823, and the author's job was to document everything they came across during their journeys, such as the name of the villages, tombs of saints, mosques, buildings, shops, streams, rivers, tanks, springs, gardens, and even the distance covered every day .

== Translation ==
The book was translated in English in 1950 by S.Muhammad Husayn Nainar. He was a M.A., L.L.B., and Ph.D. and professor and Head of the Department of Urdu, Arabic and Persia at the University of Madras. The book was printed by N. Ramaratnam at the Madras Law Journal Press at Madras.

== About Nawab ==
Ghulam Abdul Qadir Nazir accompanied Nawab Azam Jah who was the eldest son of Azim-ud-Daula. He became the second titular Nawab of the Carnatic in the year 1820, after the death of his father, Nawab Azim-ud-Daula.

== Sources ==
- S. Muhammad Husain Nainar (editor). Sources of the History of the Nawwabs of the Carnatic V. Bahar-i-A'zam-Jahi by Ghulam 'Abdu'l Kadir Nazir. Madras University Islamic Series No. 11. University of Madras, 1950.

== See also ==
- Azam Jah of the Carnatic
