= Areti Ketime =

Greek singer and santoor player (born 1989)

Areti Ketime Αρετή Κετιμέ
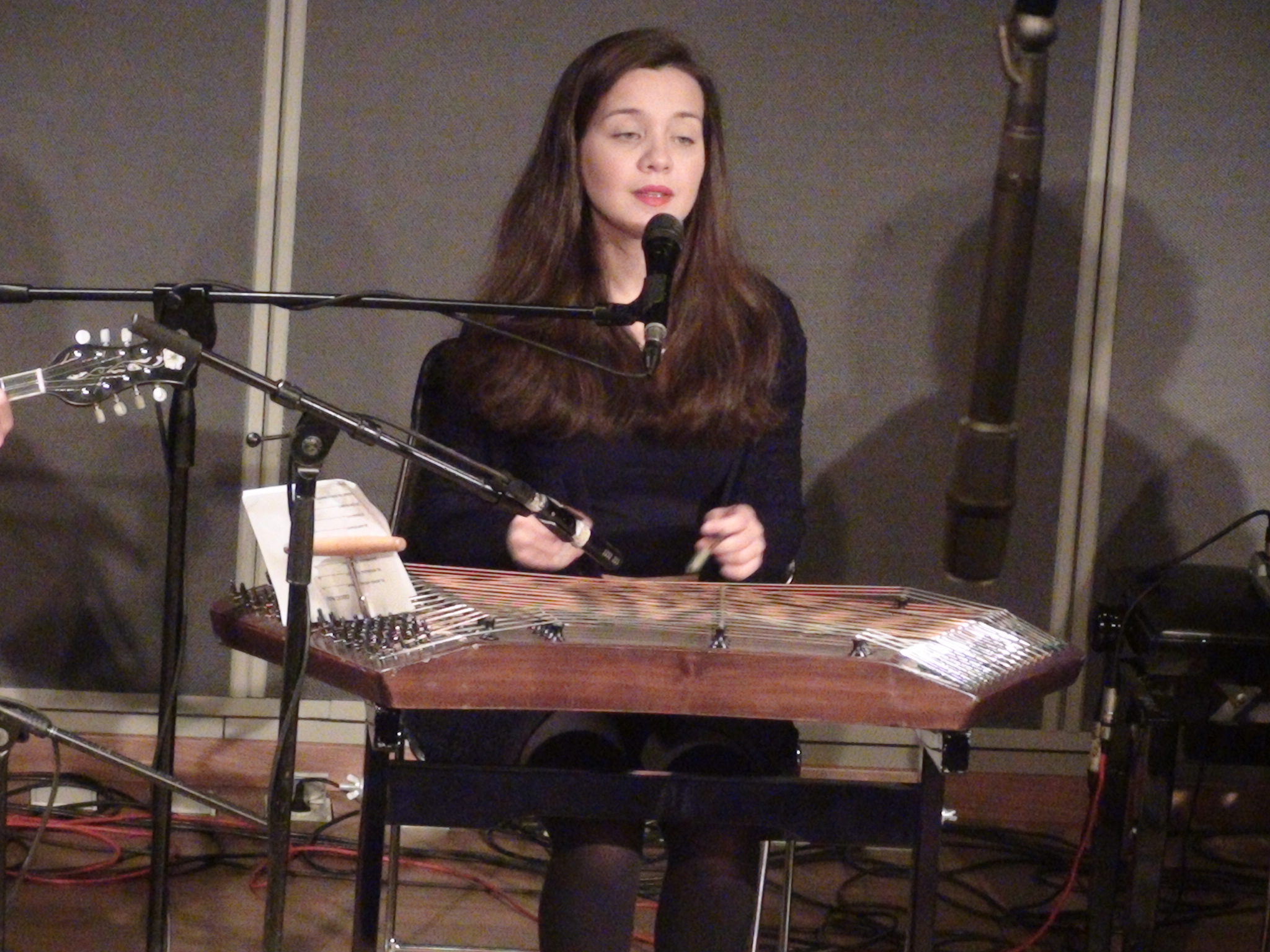

Background information
- Born: 26 July 1989 (age 37); Athens, Greece
- Genres: Folk; laïko
- Occupations: Singer; santoor player
- Instruments: Vocals; santoor
- Years active: 2002–present
- Label: The Spicy Effect

Areti Ketime (Greek: Αρετή Κετιμέ; born 26 July 1989) is a Greek singer and santur player. She sings traditional Greek songs of various music genres.

== Early life ==
Ketime was born and raised in Athens, Greece. She started learning how to play the santur at the age of six, from Aristidis Moschos and the Belarusian Angelina Tkatseva. At the age of 15 (in 2005), she became a professional performer.

== Career ==
In 2002, Greek musician and singer Yorgos Dalaras invited her to participate in his live appearances in Plaka together with Gerasimos Andreatos and Melina Aslanidou. In 2003, she participated in a show about Asia Minor's musical tradition show with Dalaras, Glykeria, and the orchestra Estoudiantina. In 2004, she participated in the opening ceremony of the Olympic Games in Athens, with the traditional song "Mes Stou Egeou Ta Nisia" ("Into the Islands of the Aegean").

In 2005, she participated in the Greek tragedy play "Oedipus Rex" in Epidaurus, as a member of the "Chorus" led by George Dalaras. In 2008, she took part in a concert titled Kyklamina ("Cyclamens") in which she performed a series of songs called Tragoudia tis Ksenitias ("Songs of Emigration") along with George Kotsinis in Aristi, Epirus.

In 2010, she teamed up with Turkish singer Dilek Koç in a concert titled "The songs of our mutual tradition", in which they mostly performed common-root songs of Greece and Turkey, at the Half Note Jazz Club.

In 2011, she performed the Byzantine Hymns of the Holy Week live on TV shows, along with Charilaos Taliadoros and Christos Chalkias.

In 2012 she performed a concert titled "Smirneiko Minore", with Glykeria and Dilek Koç. It was a tribute to the traditional music of Asia Minor.

In 2015, she participated as a musician in children's theatre version of Erotokritos directed by Ilias Karellas. In May 2015, Areti Ketime made her first North American tour, in which she was accompanied by a six-piece band of musicians and also by brothers Grigoris and Petros Papaemmanouil. Later in 2015, Ketime collaborated with German DJ Shantel on the bilingual song "EastWest/Dysi Ki Anatoli", from Shantel's new album Viva Diaspora.

During the 2015-16 season, Ketime participates in the children's theatre play "To Monon tis Zois tou Taksidion" ("The Only Journey of His Life").

In September 2017, it was announced that Areti was one of the 18 contestants participating in the Greek national final for the Eurovision Song Contest 2018. The song is written by her best friend Dimitris Karras. While the song was chosen as one of the final three songs in the selection, it was disqualified as Ketime's record label did not pay the €20,000 fee requested by ERT to finance the national final.

== Discography ==
- Me tin Foni tis Aretis ("With Areti's Voice") (2010)
- Kali sou Tihi ("Good Luck to You") (2011)
- Pinakas Zografikis ("Painting") (2012)
- Aidonaki mou ("My Nightingale") (2014)
