= R. Ramakrishnan =

Indian industrialist and politician (1946–2019)

R Ramakrishnan

Member of Parliament, Rajya Sabha

Sheriff of Madras

Personal details
- Born: 26 March 1946 Madras, Madras Presidency
- Died: 7 July 2019 (aged 73)
- Party: AIADMK
- Occupation: Politician, Industrialist, Philanthropist

Rangaswami Ramakrishnan (26 March 1946 – 7 July 2019) was an Indian industrialist and a member of Rajya Sabha from Tamil Nadu.

== Biography ==
Ramakrishnan was a graduate in commerce and held a master's degree in economics. He stood first at the university and was a gold medalist.

Ramakrishnan joined Indian Express Group of newspapers in 1965 where he rose to become its chief executive. He was appointed Sheriff of Madras in 1974-75 and was then elected to Parliament (Rajya Sabha) in 1980. He was a member of several Parliamentary Committees including the prestigious CQPIJ (Committee of Public Undertakings), Joint Select Committee of Chit Funds etc., the Press Council of India for two terms and was also the vice-president of the (Rajya Sabha). He also enjoyed the distinction of having been invited to address the 40th General Assembly of United Nations in 1985.

Ramakrishnan was a non-executive independent director of TVS Motor Co Ltd and has also served as a director of TVS Finance & Services Ltd, as well as a director of the TVS group of companies. Ramakrishnan has also been an additional non-executive and independent director of Ennore Coke Limited from 31 October 2008 to 25 December 2015. He also represented India at the World Coffee Conference held in September 2005.

He was appointed governing council member of the Rajaji Institute of Public Affairs and Administration by the president of India and was also the chairman of Sir C P Ramaswamy Aiyer Educational Trust. He was the chairman of Madras Race Club and served in the committee of Madras Race Club. He had been the governor for Rotary Club of Rotary District 3230, (District in India extending from Hosur, Chennai to Vedaranyam). He was a recipient of several awards including the highest Rotary "Service Above Self".
