= Santoor =

Indian musical instrument

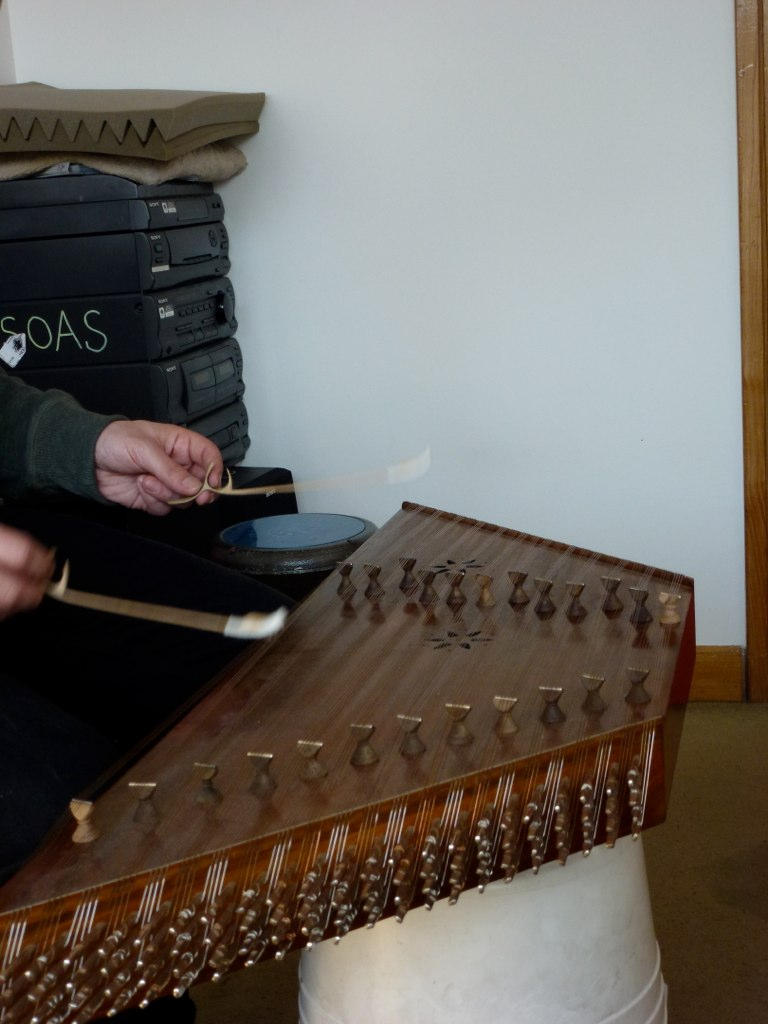
- A musician playing a santoor

String instrument
- Classification: Percussion instrument (chordophone), string instrument
- Hornbostel–Sachs classification: 314.122-4 (Simple chordophone sounded by hammers)
- Developed: Antiquity

Related instruments
- Hammered Dulcimer

Sound sample
- Imperial Salute of Iran (santoor)

The Indian santoor instrument is a trapezoid-shaped hammered dulcimer, and a variation of the Iranian santur. The instrument is generally made of walnut wood and has 25 bridges. Each bridge has 4 strings, making for a total of 100 strings. It is a traditional instrument in Jammu and Kashmir, and dates back to ancient times. It was called Shatha Tantri Veena in ancient Sanskrit texts.

== Development ==
In ancient Sanskrit texts, it has been referred to as shatatantri vina (100-stringed vina). In Kashmir the santoor was used to accompany folk music. It is played in a style of music known as the Sufiana Mausiqi. Some researchers slot it as an improvised version of a primitive instrument played in the Mesopotamian times (1600–900 B.C.) Sufi mystics used it as an accompaniment to their hymns. In Indian santoor playing, the specially-shaped mallets (mezrab) are lightweight and are held between the index and middle fingers. A typical santoor has two sets of bridges, providing a range of three octaves. The Indian santoor is more rectangular and can have more strings than its Persian counterpart, which generally has 72 strings. Musical instruments very similar to the santoor are traditionally used all over the world.

== Characteristics ==
The trapezoid framework is generally made out of either walnut or maple wood. The top and bottom boards sometimes can be either plywood or veneer. On the top board, also known as the soundboard, wooden bridges are placed, in order to seat stretched metal strings across. The strings, grouped in units of 3 or 4, are tied on nails or pins on the left side of the instrument and are stretched over the sound board on top of the bridges to the right side. On the right side there are steel tuning pegs or tuning pins, as they are commonly known, that allows tuning each unit of strings to a desired musical note or a frequency or a pitch.

== Technique ==
The santoor is played while sitting in an asana called ardha-padmasana and placing it on the lap. While being played, the broad side is closer to the waist of the musician and the shorter side is away from the musician. It is played with a pair of light wooden mallets held with both hands. The santoor is a delicate instrument and sensitive to light strokes and glides. The strokes are played always on the strings either closer to the bridges or a little away from bridges: the styles result in different tones. Strokes by one hand can be muffled by the other hand by using the face of the palm to create variety.

== Notable players ==
- Ulhas Bapat (1950–2018)
- Tarun Bhattacharya (b. 1957)
- Rahul Sharma (b. 1972)
- Shivkumar Sharma (1938–2022)
- Abhay Sopori
- Bhajan Sopori (1948–2022)
- R. Visweswaran (1944–2007)
- Varsha Agrawal (b. 1967)
- Mohammad Tibet Baqal (1914–1982)
- Harjinder Pal Singh (b. 1953)
- Areti Ketime (b. 1989)

== See also ==
- Ghulam Muhammad Zaz (b. 1941), the last known handcrafted santoor maker in Kashmir
