= Azim-ud-Daula =

Nawab of the Carnatic from 1801 to 1819

- Nawab of the Carnatic; Amir ul-Hind; Wala Jah; Umdat ul-Umara; Siraj ul-Mulk; Amir ud-Daula
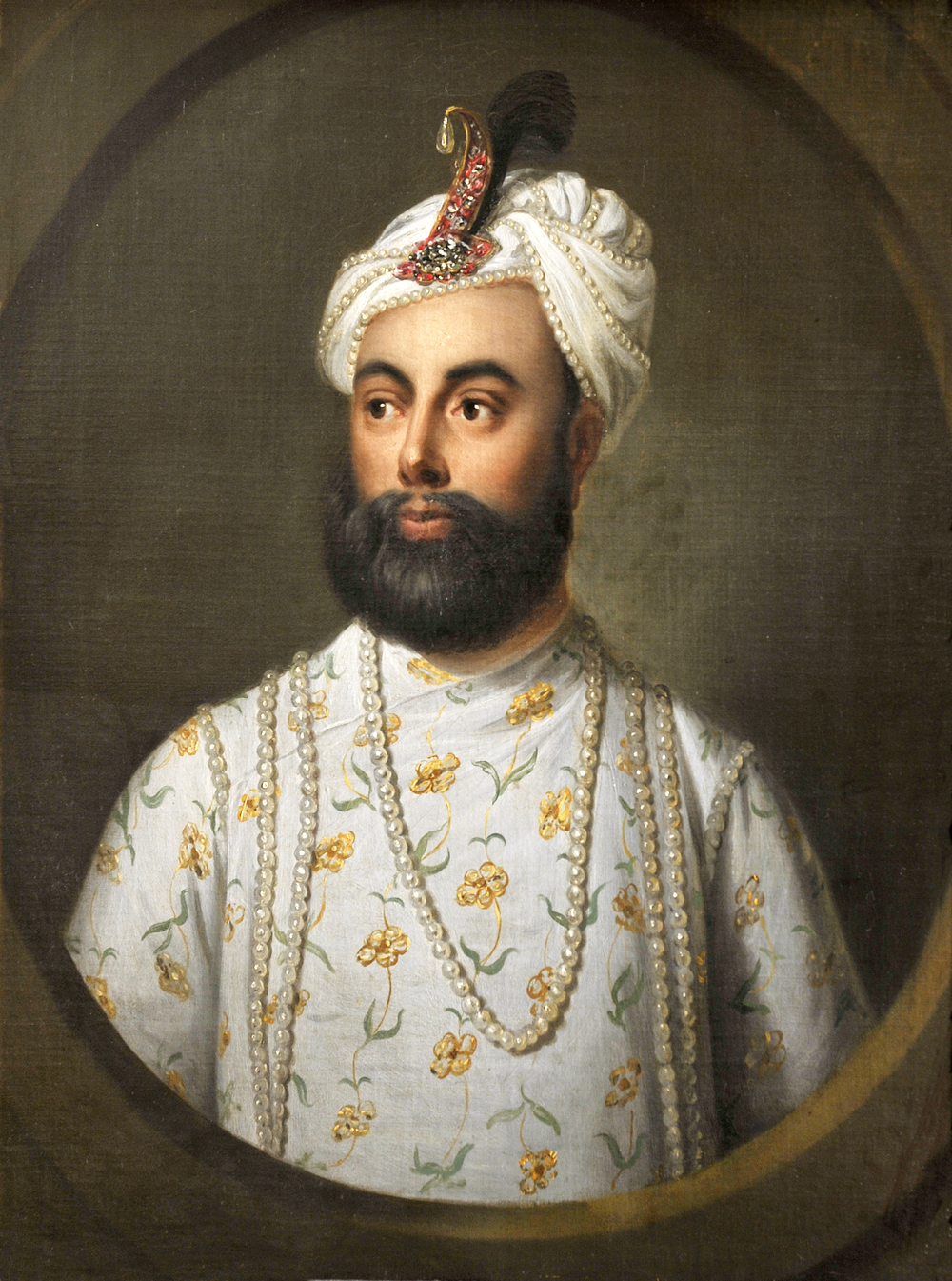
- Azim-ud-Daula

Nawab of the Carnatic
- Reign: 31 July 1801 – 2 August 1819
- Predecessor: Umdat ul-Umara
- Successor: Azam Jah
- Born: 1775
- Died: 2 August 1819 (aged 43–44); Chepauk Palace, Madras
- Burial: Hazrat Natthar Wali Dargah, Farangi-Gate, Trichinopoly
- Issue: seven sons
- Abdu'l Ali Khan
- Dynasty: Wallajah
- Father: Amir ul-Umara
- Mother: Azim un-nisa Begum
- Religion: Islam

Azim-ud-Daula (1775 – 2 August 1819) was the Nawab of the Carnatic from 1801 to 1819. He was the eldest son of Amir ul-Umara and nephew of Umdat ul-Umara.

== Treaty of 1801 ==
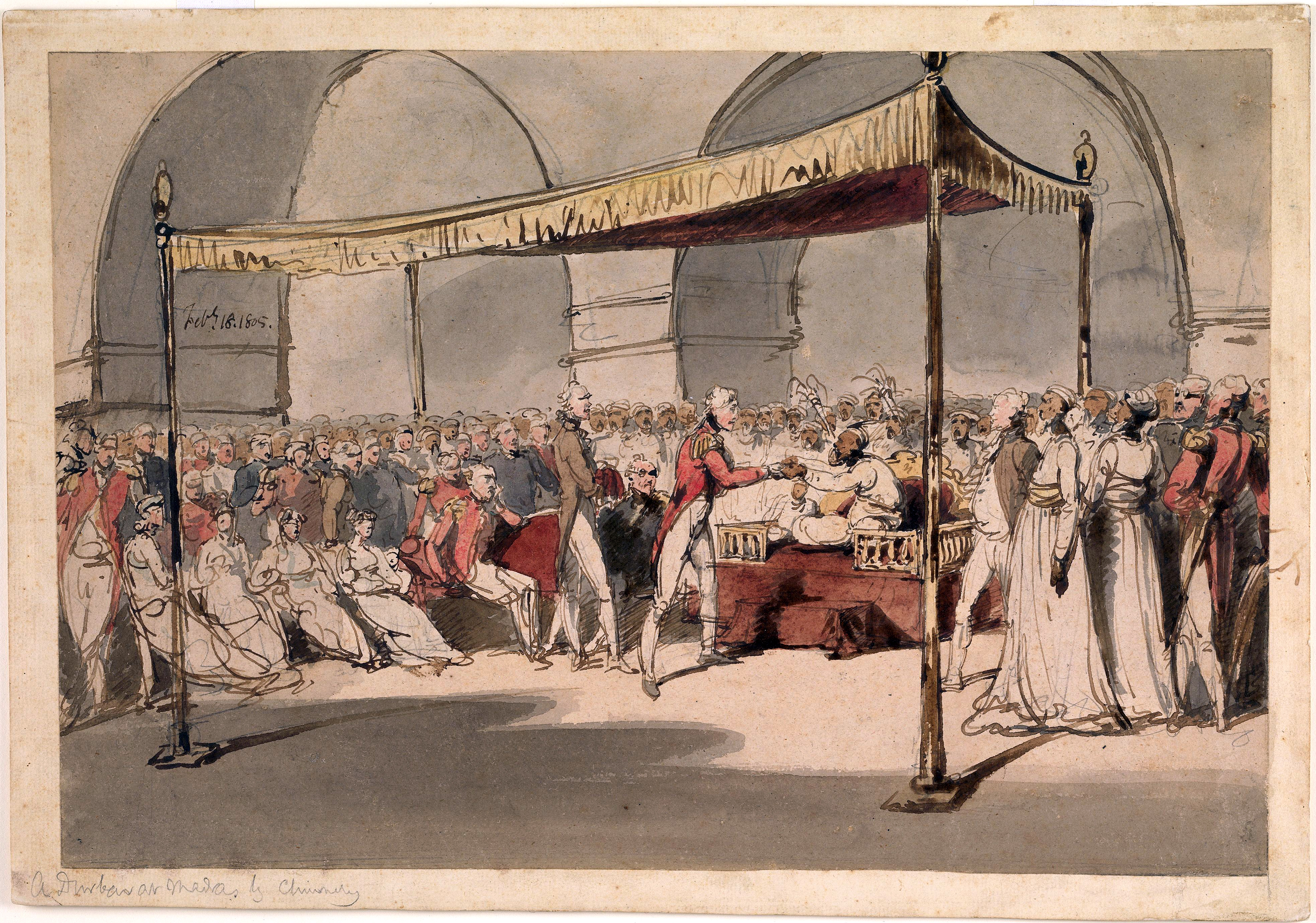
Azim-ud-Daula

He ascended the throne upon his uncle's death in 1801.

As soon as Azim-ud-Daula ascended the throne, he was compelled to sign a Carnatic Treaty handing over the civil and municipal administration of the Carnatic to the British East India Company.

Azim-ud-Daula was, therefore, reduced to the position of a mere titular ruler.

In return, Azim-ud-Daula was entitled to one-fifth of the total revenue of the state and the honour of a 21-gun salute.

A portrait of Azim-ud-Daula by Thomas Day hangs in the Museum at Fort George, Chennai.

Preceded by Umdat ul-Umara	Nawab of Carnatic; 1801–1819	Succeeded by Azam Jah
