= Umdat ul-Umara =

Nawab of the Carnatic from 1795 to 1801

- Nawab; Amir ul-Hind; Wala Jah; Umdat ul-Umara; Najim ul-Mulk; Azad ud-Daula
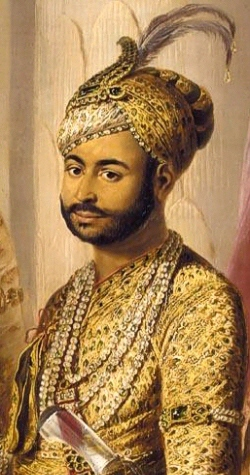
- Portrait of Umdat ul-Umara by Tilly Kettle, c. 1770

Nawab of the Carnatic
- Reign: 13 October 1795 – 15 July 1801
- Coronation: 16 October 1795
- Predecessor: Muhammad Ali Khan Wallajah
- Successor: Azim-ud-Daula
- Born: 8 January 1748
- Died: 15 July 1801 (aged 53); Madras
- Burial: Hazrat Natthar Wali Dargah, Farangi-Gate, Tiruchirappalli
- Issue: three sons and three daughters
Names
- Ghulam Husain Ali Khan
- Dynasty: Wallajah
- Father: Muhammad Ali Khan Wallajah
- Mother: Nawab Begum Sahiba
- Military career
- Allegiance: Mughal Empire
- Branch: Nawab of Arcot
- Rank: Subadar
- Conflicts: Fourth Anglo-Mysore War

Ghulam Husain Ali Khan (8 January 1748 – 15 July 1801) aka Ghulam Hussainy or Umdat ul-Umra, was the Nawab of the Carnatic state in the Mughal Empire from 1795 to 1801.

He was actually named by his grandfather, Anwaruddin Khan, as "Abdul Wali". But he was subsequently renamed as "Umdat ul-Umara", after the name of the court of the Mughal Emperor Shah Alam II.

== Early life ==
Umdat ul-Umara was the son of Muhammad Ali Khan Walahjah, a staunch ally of the British East India Company.

He was appointed Naib Subah of Nattharnagar (1759–1760), and Subah of Arcot (1760), and raised to the title of Umdat ul-Umara by Emperor Shah Alam II, through the intercession of Robert Clive, 12 August 1765.

== Reign ==
Umdat ul-Umara succeeded on the death of his father on 13 October 1795 and installed on the musnaid 16 October 1795. He ruled from 1795 to 1801. During his reign, the British East India Company demanded pieces of land as gifts.

Many members of the East India Company believed that Umdat ul-Umara, as the Nawab of Carnatic, had secretly provided assistance to Tipu Sultan during the Fourth Anglo-Mysore War. On the fall of Tipu Sultan in 1799, immediately, the British accused the Nawab of collaborating with Tipu Sultan, and demanded the entire administration of the kingdom as indemnity.

Umdat ul-Umara resisted the demands of the East India Company. He died, perhaps poisoned by the Company, soon afterwards. The British takeover of Umdat ul-Umara's domain occurred during the reign of his nephew and successor, Azim-ud-Daula. As soon as Azim-ud-Daula ascended the throne, on 31 July 1801 he was compelled to sign a Carnatic Treaty handing over the civil and municipal administration of the Carnatic to the British East India Company. This document provided that Azim-ud-Daula ceded all his lands to British rule, including the territory of the Polygars.

== See also ==
- Nawabs of the Carnatic
