= Azam Jah of the Carnatic =

Nawab of the Carnatic from 1819 to 1825

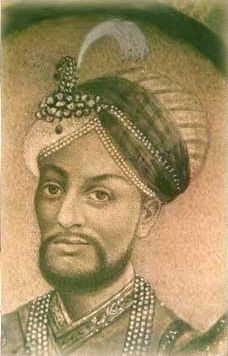
Azam Jah

Azam Jah (1797 – 12 November 1825) was the Nawab of the Carnatic Sultanate from 1819 to 1825.

Azam Jah ascended the throne on the death of his father Azim-ud-Daula in 1819. He ruled for a short period of time and died in 1825. Azam Jah was succeeded by his minor son Ghulam Muhammad Ghouse Khan.

Preceded by Azim-ud-Daula	Nawab of Carnatic; 1819–1825	Succeeded by Ghulam Muhammad Ghouse Khan

== See also ==
- Bahar I Azam Jahi
