= Ghulam Muhammad Ali Khan =

- Nawab of Arcot
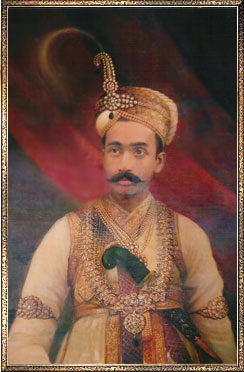
- Reign: 1903-1952
- Predecessor: Muhammad Munawar Khan
- Successor: Ghulam Mohiuddin Khan
- Born: 26 February 1882
- Died: 1952

Khan Bahadur Sir Ghulam Muhammad Ali Khan GCIE (1882–1952) was the fifth Prince of Arcot and ruled from 1903 to 1952.

== Early life ==
Ghulam Muhammad Ali Khan was born on 26 February 1882 to Muhammad Munawar Khan. He was educated at the Newington Court of Wards institution.

== Reign ==
Ghulam Muhammad Ali Khan succeeded to the throne on the death of his father Muhammad Munawar Khan in 1903. The next year he was nominated to the Madras Legislative Council and served from 1904 to 1906. In 1910, he was nominated to the Imperial Legislative Council of India representing the Muslims of Madras Presidency. He served as a member of the Imperial Legislative Council from 1910 to 1913. In 1916 he was re-nominated to the Madras Legislative Council and served a second term lasting from 1916 to 1919.

He also served as the President of the All India Muslim League. He was the principal nobleman and the chief representative of Muslims in Madras Presidency.

Ghulam Muhammad Ali Khan died in 1952 and was buried with full state honours.

== Honours ==
Ghulam Muhammad Ali Khan was honoured with the title of "Khan Bahadur" on 22 June 1897. He was made a Knight Commander of the Order of the Indian Empire on 1 January 1909. This was upgraded to a GCIE in 1917. He was allowed to use the honorific "His Highness" from 1935 onwards. He was also permitted to have a detachment of bodyguards.

Preceded by Muhammad Munawar Khan	Nawab of Arcot; 1903–1952	Succeeded by Ghulam Mohiuddin Khan
Preceded by	Member of the Madras Legislative Council; 1904–1906	Succeeded by
Preceded by	Member of the Imperial Legislative Council of India; 1910–1913	Succeeded by
Preceded by	Member of the Madras Legislative Council; 1916–1919	Succeeded by
