= Pundi Runganadha Mudaliar =

- A portrait of Pundi Runganadha Mudaliar
- Born: 1847; Madras
- Died: 10 December 1893 (aged 45–46); Madras
- Education: Presidency College, Madras
- Occupations: professor, translator, administrator

Rai Bahadur Pundi Runganadha Mudaliar (c. 1847 – 10 December 1893) or Poondi Ranganatha Mudaliar was a Tamil writer, educationist and politician.

== Early life ==
Runganadha Mudaliar was born in 1847 in Madras to Pundi Subbaraya Mudaliar who worked as a manager in the Madras Irrigation Company. Subbaraya Mudaliar was transferred to Avanashi when Runganadha was young but later moved to Madras following an incident of burglary.

Runganadha had his initial schooling at home where he learnt Tamil and English. At the age of thirteen, Runganadha enrolled in Pachaiyappa's High School. He completed his matriculation in 1862 and stood first in the province in the examinations. He joined the Presidency College, Madras and completed his graduation in February 1865 in first class, excelling in mathematics, English, philosophy and Tamil. Thomson, the principal of the Presidency College was pleased with him that he appointed him Assistant Master soon after his graduation in 1865.

== Educational career ==
On completion of his education, Mudaliar worked as a college professor. In 1881, he was confirmed as Professor of Mathematics at the Presidency College, Madras. Earlier, in 1872, he had been nominated fellow of the Madras University. From 1875 to 1893 he wielded great power and influence as a member of the syndicate of the Madras University.

In 1890, Mudaliar was appointed as the official Tamil translator to the Madras government. Two years later, he was appointed Sheriff of Madras.

== Later life ==
Mudaliar fell ill in December 1893 and took leave from work. However, the illness did not appear to be serious and he was expected to recover. But contrary to expectations, Mudaliar succumbed to the disease on 10 December 1893, on the fifth day of his leave.

== Legacy ==
Runganadha Mudaliar was acclaimed for his work in the Education Commission and for his efforts towards preservation of Indian languages. His sense of discretion was praised by his contemporaries. Runganadha Mudaliar was a scholar of Tamil literature and himself, composed some literary works. He was a patron of Dr. U. V. Swaminatha Ayyar, the great Tamil scholar. Prof. Mudaliar was appointed to assist Sir William Wilson Hunter in matters pertaining to the Madras Presidency when the latter undertook to prepare the second edition of The Imperial Gazetteer of India.

Runganadha Mudaliar entered politics in his later life and attended sessions of the Indian National Congress. He campaigned for India's independence and founded the Native Public Opinion newspaper. He also served as a Commissioner of Madras city.

== Works ==
- Kachi Kalambagam.
