= Ghulam Muhammad Zaz =

Indian artist

- Born: Kashmir
- Occupation: Artist
- Known for: Last santoor maker in Kashmir
- Awards: Padma Shri

Ghulam Muhammad Zaz is an artist from Kashmir, India. He is known for making santoors and other hand-crafted traditional musical instruments. He is known to be the last santoor maker in Kashmir.

On 26 January 2023, he was honored with the Padma Shri, the fourth-highest civilian award in India.

== Early life ==
Zaz was born in 1941, in the Zaina Kadal area of Srinagar. He was born into a family of string instrument craftsmen, with his father and grandfather passing down the art of santoor making to him at an early age. He has been making traditional Kashmiri musical instruments like the santoor, rabab and sarangi since 1953.
