= Ghulam Mohiuddin Khan =

- Nawab of Arcot
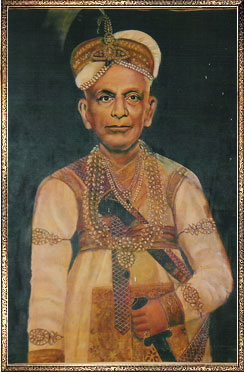
- Reign: 1952 - 1969
- Predecessor: Ghulam Muhammad Ali Khan
- Successor: Ghulam Mohammed Abdul Khader
- Died: 1969

Ghulam Mohiuddin Khan was the sixth Prince of Arcot and served from 1952 to 1969. He was the younger brother of Ghulam Muhammad Ali Khan, the fifth Prince of Arcot.

== Early life ==
During his period as prince, Ghulam Mohiuddin Khan served as the Sheriff of Madras and was also involved in welcoming dignitaries to the palace.

== Reign ==
Ghulam Mohiuddin Khan became Prince in 1952. During his reign, Mohiuddin Khan frequently received dignitaries as the then Prime Minister of India Jawaharlal Nehru, President of India Rajendra Prasad and other dignitaries. He visited the Kingdom of Saudi Arabia in 1966 to perform Haj as the guest of the King.

== Death ==
Mohiuddin Khan died in October 1969 after a brief illness and was succeeded by his son Ghulam Mohammed Abdul Khader.

Preceded by Ghulam Muhammad Ali Khan	Nawab of Arcot; 1952 - 1969	Succeeded by Ghulam Mohammed Abdul Khader
