= Ghulam Mohammed Abdul Khader =

Ghulam Muhammad Abdul Khader
- Nawab of Arcot
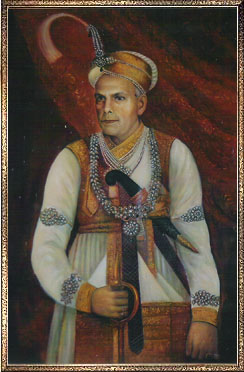
- Reign: 1969 - 1993
- Predecessor: Ghulam Mohiuddin Khan
- Successor: Muhammed Abdul Ali
- Died: 30 August 1993 (aged 80)

Ghulam Mohammed Abdul Khader was the seventh Prince of Arcot. He was the son of Ghulam Mohiuddin Khan, the sixth Prince of Arcot.

== Biography ==
He held the title from 1969, until his death in 1993. He was succeeded by Muhammed Abdul Ali who succeeded as the titular head of the family.

| Preceded by Ghulam Mohiuddin Khan | Nawab of Arcot; 1969 - 1993 | Succeeded by Muhammed Abdul Ali |
