= Standard Motor Products of India Limited =

- Company type: Automobile manufacturer
- Industry: Automotive
- Founded: 1948
- Defunct: 2006
- Fate: defunct
- Headquarters: Perungalathur, Chennai, Tamil Nadu, India
- Key people: C. V. Karthik Narayanan; A. C. Muthiah
- Products: Automobiles; Commercial Vehicles
- Number of employees: n/a

Standard Motor Products of India Limited otherwise known as Stampro for short, formerly known as Union Motors , was an Indian automobile manufacturer based in Chennai which produced Standard cars and light commercial vehicles in collaboration with Standard-Triumph of England. The company was established in 1948 and was in operation till 1988.

== Early history ==
Standard Motor Products of India, then known as STAMPRO was established by C. V. Karthik Narayanan, grandson of C. P. Ramaswami Aiyar. It was a joint venture between Union Motors India and Standard Motor Company in United Kingdom to assembly Standard range of cars in India. The factory was set up at then outskirts of Chennai, at Perungalathur, east of Tambaram in 1948.

== Production models ==
=== Vanguard and Standard models ===
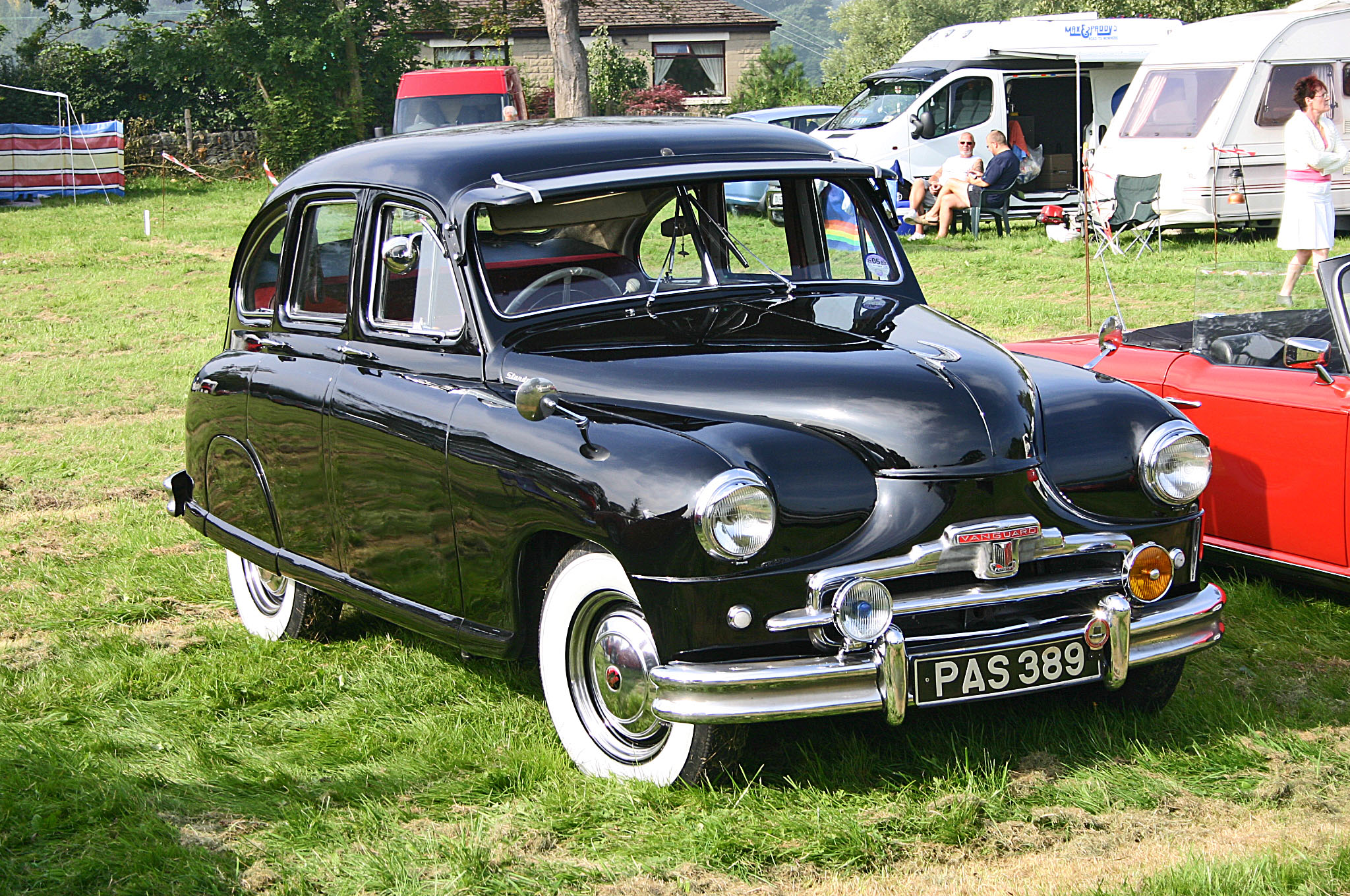
Standard Vanguard Phase IA

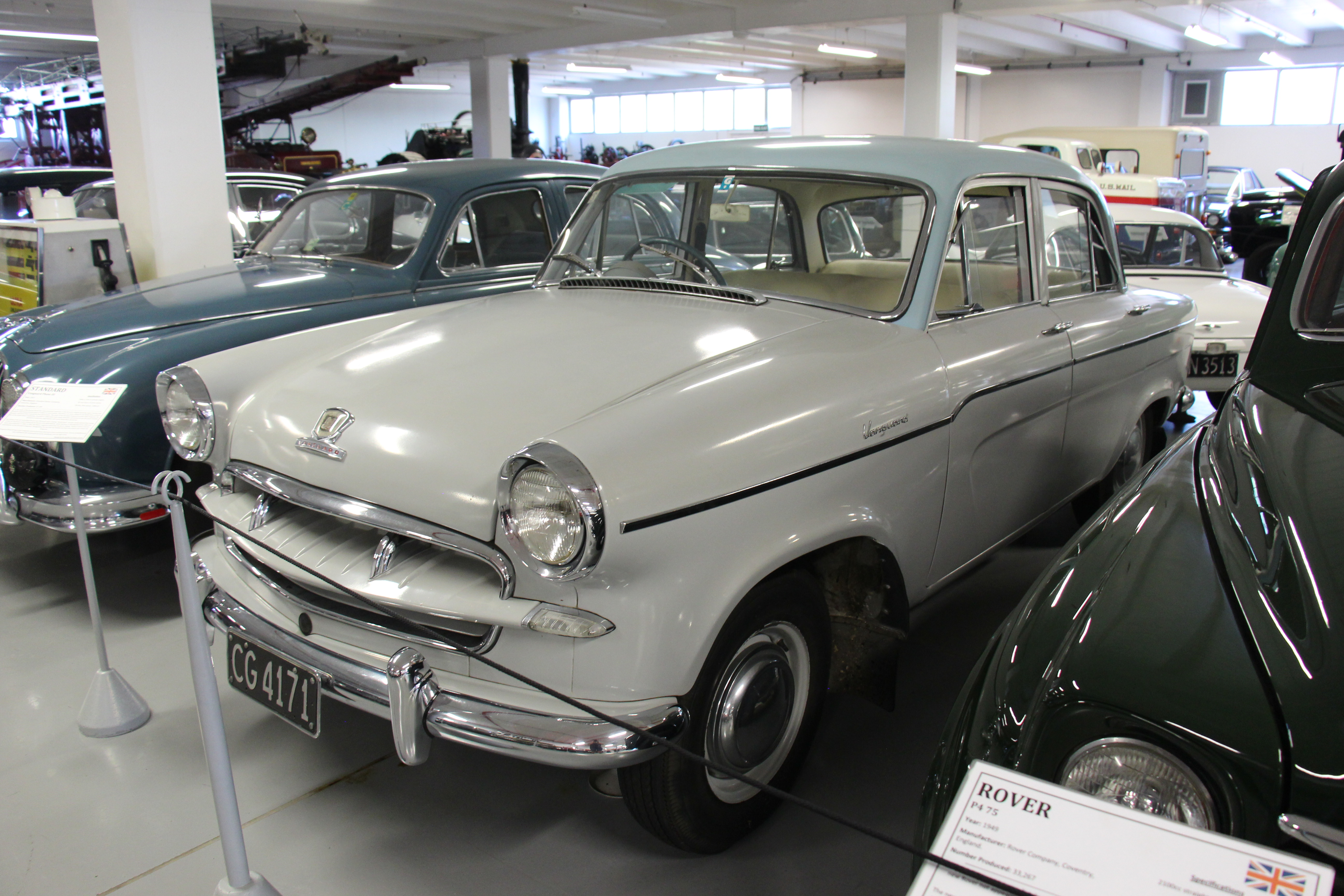
1957 Standard Vanguard Phase III Sedan

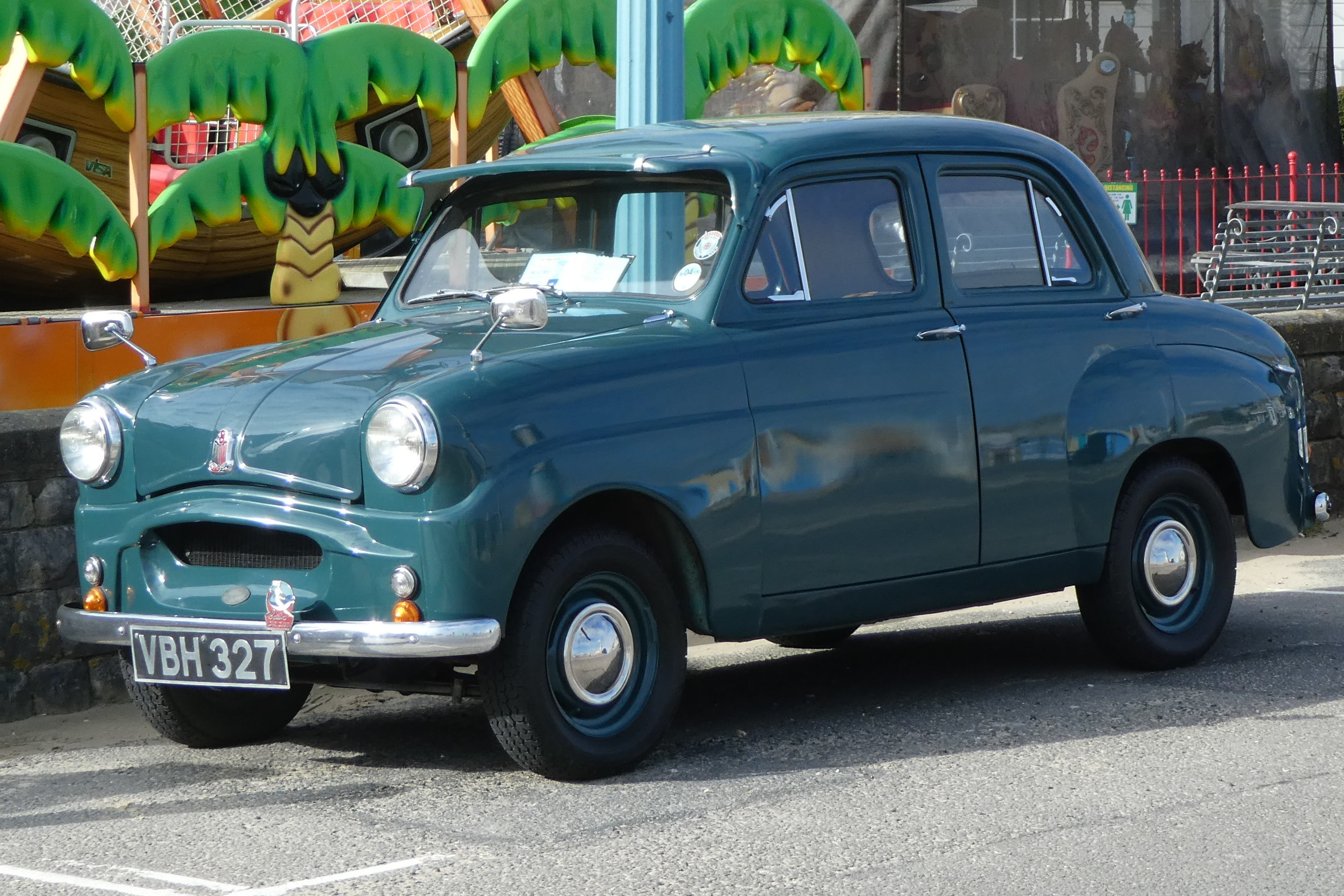
1955 Standard 8

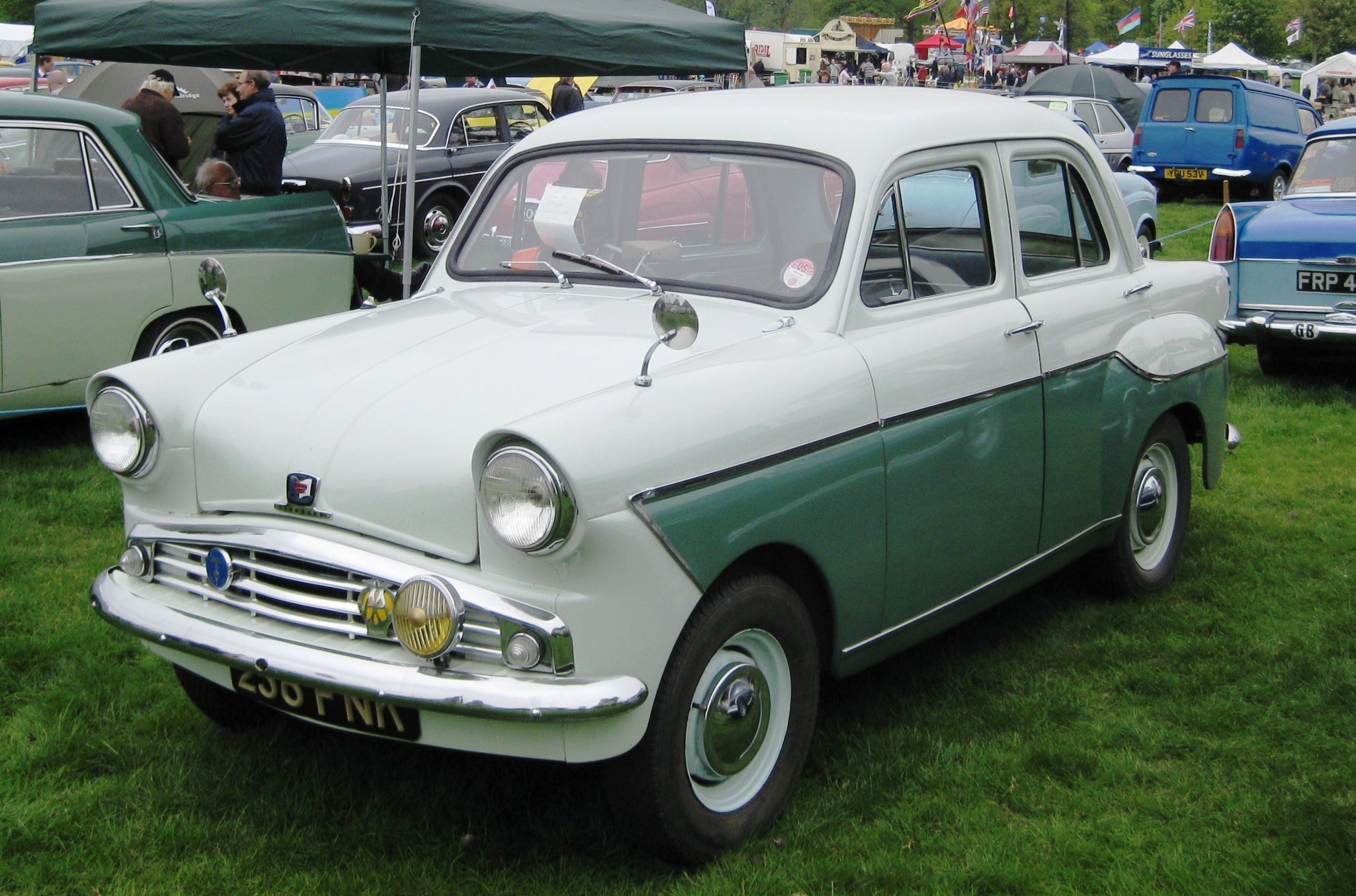
Standard Pennant

The first car to roll out from this facility in 1951 was the Standard Vanguard Phase I Saloon. Later the compact 1953 model Standard Eight were launched followed by 1954 Standard Ten. In late fifties Standard Pennant was launched followed by a station wagon version. Also during the 50's, the larger Standard Vanguard Phase III Saloon was also offered side by side.

=== Standard Atlas and 20 ===
In the 1960s the company launched the Standard Atlas commercial Van. This model was changed slightly for the Indian market and redesigned as panel van as well as passenger van and was sold as a Standard 20 which continued well into 1980s. Later versions offered a pickup version as well as a passenger version.

=== Standard Herald ===
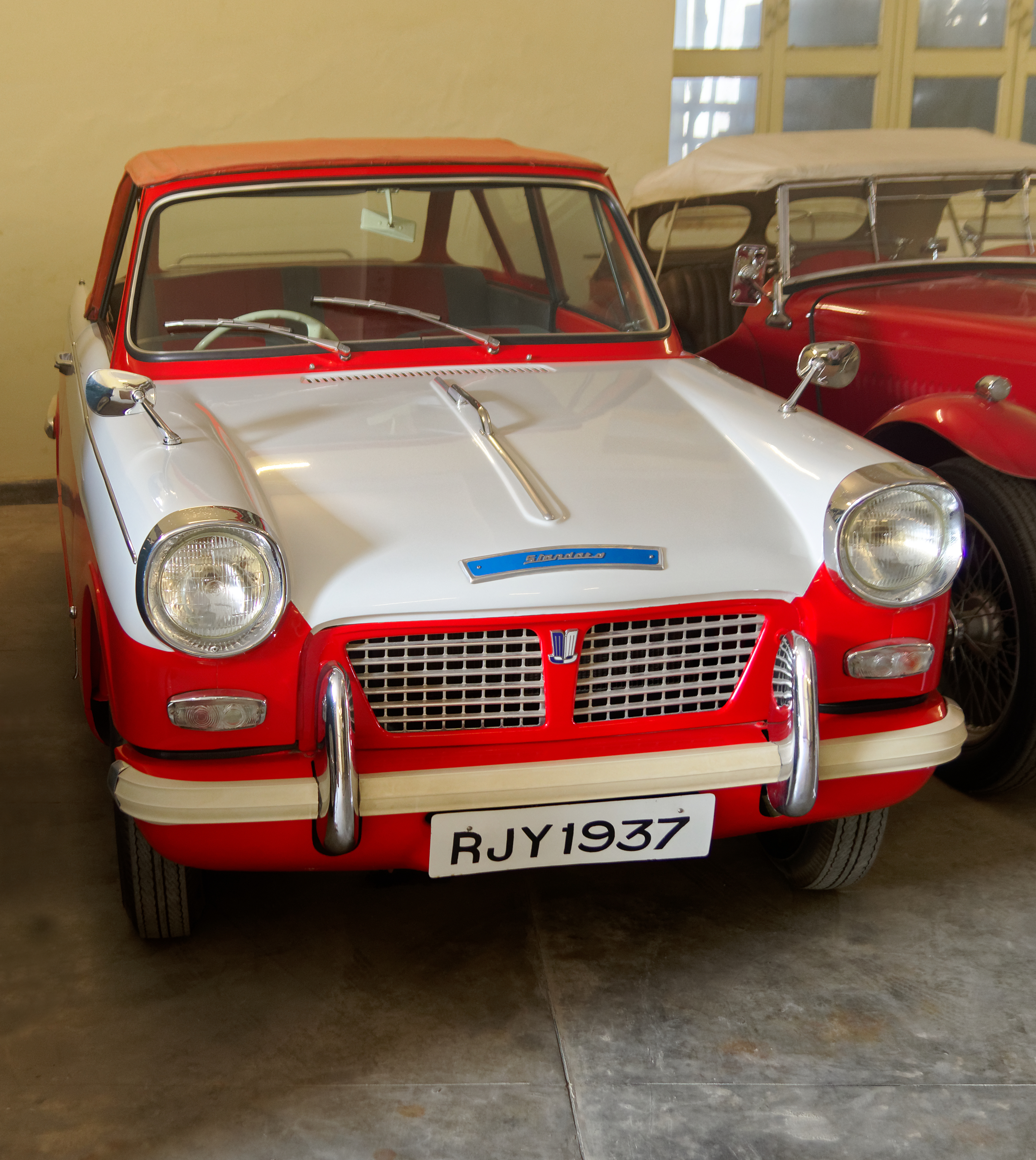
Triumph Herald sold as Standard Herald

During the mid-1950s following the drop in sales for Standard and Vanguard models, the Triumph name was used for upcoming models and the Triumph Herald was relaunched in India as Standard Herald. The Indian model had four-door version and used the engine from the earlier Standard models.

=== Standard Gazel ===
In the mid-1970s Standard Motors India launched the Standard Gazel model, which was developed in-house based on the Standard Herald model. But soon the sales dropped to such a dismal low that the company stopped production and continued with its Standard Atlas vans and pickups.

=== Standard 2000 ===
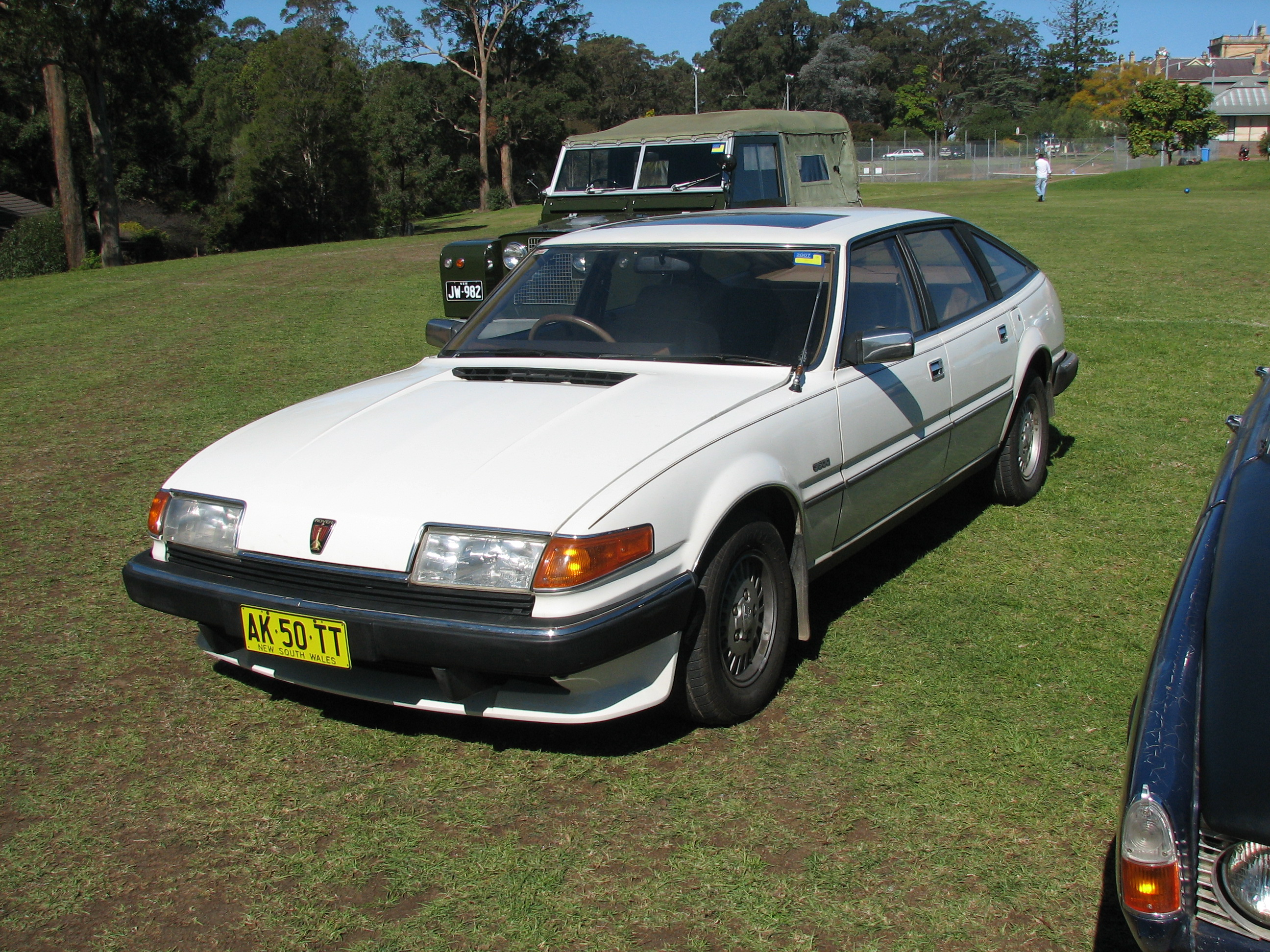
Rover 3500 SD1 sold as Standard 2000

In the mid-1980s the central government relaxed the investment regulations and Tariff Commission regulations and allowed all Indian automobile companies to have a technical tie-up with foreign counterparts. SMPL once again sought the collaboration with its old partner now under Rover group. The 1976 Rover SD1 was launched in India in 1985 as Standard 2000 and was priced at the premium end. The sales dropped when customers complained that the 1950s Vanguard powered Rover wasn't quick enough and was a notorious gas guzzler. Soon the company became near bankrupt and was taken over by A.C. Muthiah group.

Further BIFR intervention in investments and consolidation of commercial vans segment did not help the company and in the late 1990s the company ceased operations. In 2005 the company was liquidated and the land sold to Shriram Chits group. The space is today an IT office park named Shriram The Gateway Office Park in Perugalathur.
