= Addison Motor Company =

British automobile

The Addison Motor Company was an English automobile company based in Liverpool. James Harold Atherton was the sole proprietor and works manager from 1903 until 1918.

The 6 1/2 hp (4.8 kW) two-cylinder engine was controlled by variable-lift inlet valves. It was promoted as "the Mercedes of the tri-car world".

The company also produced motorcycles in 1904–1905.

The Addison touring car and tri-car were shown and well received by The Motor at the ninth Liverpool Motor Show.

The Addison tri-car won a silver medal at a hill-climbing contest held by the University of Liverpool Motor Club on 13 July 1905.

In January 1912, it was reported that the company was so successful that they had to open a separate showroom at 7 Berry Street in Liverpool for their Alldays and Phoenix cars.

Another car the company sold was the Speedwell.

Around 1922, the company expanded to a larger garage.
