= Ghulam Muhammad Ghouse Khan =

Nawab of the Carnatic from 1825 to 1855

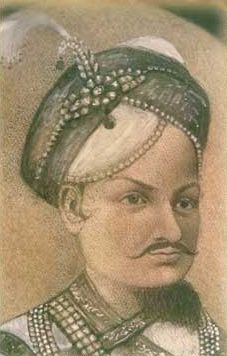
Ghulam Muhammad Ghouse Khan

Ghulam Muhammad Ghouse Khan (1824 – 7 October 1855) was the 12th and last Nawab of the Carnatic. He reigned from 1825 to 1855. He belonged to the Second Dynasty.

== Early life ==
Ghouse Khan was born to the Azam Jah, the eleventh Nawab of the Carnatic in about 1824. His father died when he was one year old. In 1825, Ghouse Khan was proclaimed king with his uncle Azim Jah as regent.

== Reign ==
Ghouse Khan ruled from 1825 to 1842, with Azim Jah as regent, until Ghouse Khan was formally installed as the Nawab of the Carnatic by Viceroy Lord Elphinstone.

During his reign, until his death in 1855, Ghouse Khan established the Muhammadan Public Library in Madras and a choultry called Langar Khana. The Langar Khana now houses the Muslim Widows Association.

== Death ==
Ghouse Khan died in 1855 at the age of 31. He did not leave behind any male heir. The candidature of Ghouse Khan's uncle Azim Jah, the only possible successor to the throne was passed over and the kingdom was formally annexed by the British East India Company as per the Doctrine of Lapse.

Preceded by Azam Jah	Nawab of the Carnatic; 1825 - 1855	Succeeded by Azim Jah (from 1867 onwards, as the titular Nawab of Arcot)
