= Amir Mahal =

Building in India

Coordinates: 13.056551°N 80.268533°E

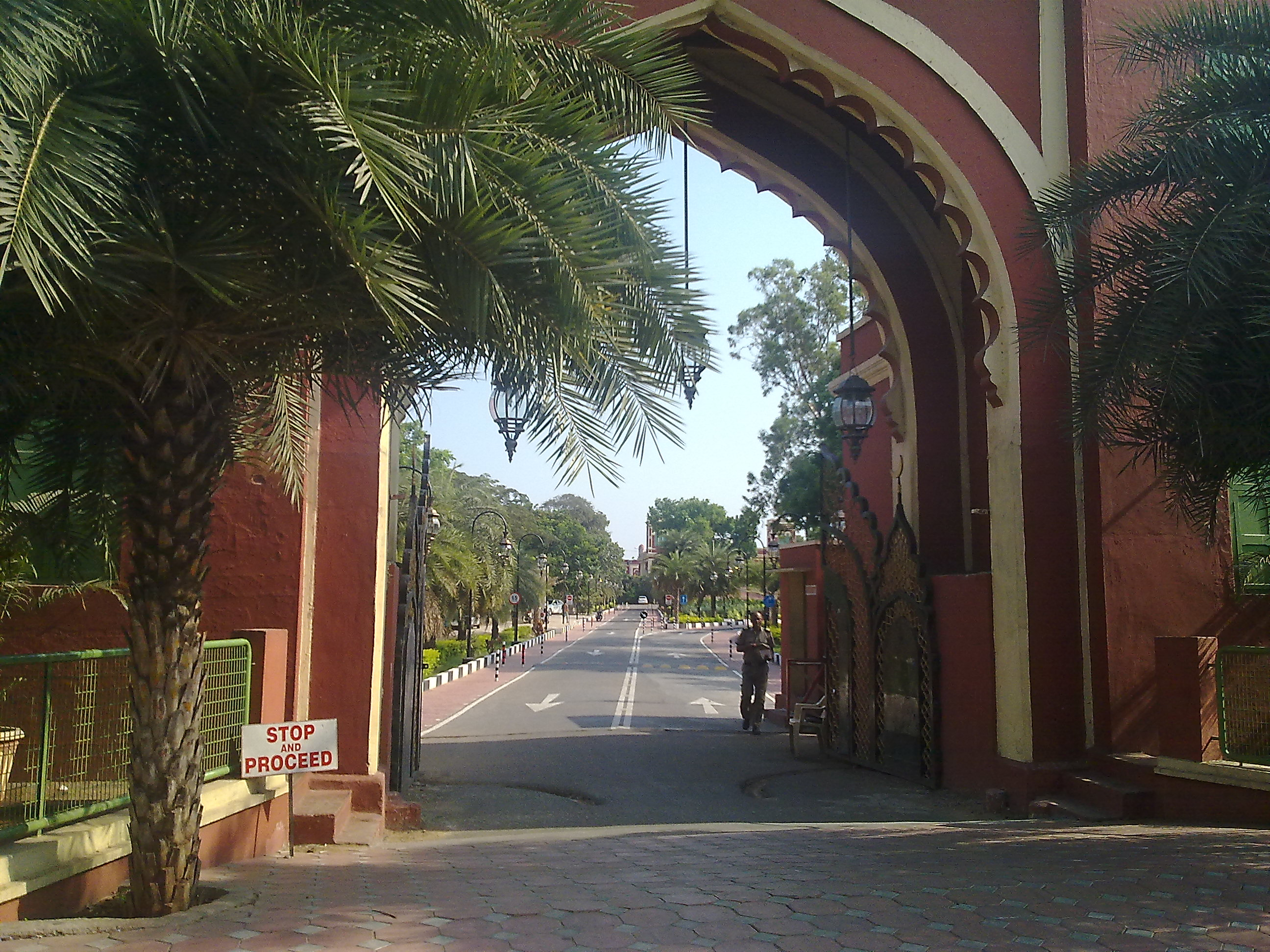
Entrance of the Amir Mahal

The Amir Mahal is the official residence of the titular Nawab of Arcot and his family. Situated in Royapettah, a neighbourhood of Chennai, India, it was constructed in Indo-Saracenic style in 1798, the Amir Mahal has been the residence of the family since 1876. The Prince of Arcot, Nawab Mohammed Abdul Ali, lives in the palace with his family.

== History ==
The Amir Mahal was constructed in 1798 by the British East India Company to house administrative offices of the company. When the Carnatic kingdom was annexed by the Company in 1855 as per the Doctrine of Lapse, the Chepauk Palace, the official residence of the Nawabs, was auctioned off and purchased by the Madras government. The Nawab moved to a building called Shadi Mahal on Triplicane High Road and lived there. However, the British felt that the Shadi Mahal was "not a place fit for the residence of the Prince of Arcot" and granted him the Amir Mahal in Royapettah. Robert Chrisholm was given the task of converting the office building into a palace. In 1876, the Nawab moved in with his family into the Amir Mahal. The Amir Mahal has since been the residence of the titular Nawabs of Arcot.

Today, Amir Mahal has hidden itself inside the city's chaos and rushed daily life. Rarely known to the locals themselves, this palace continues to function as a royal residential complex. While visitors are rarely allowed inside, it still has entertained several political leaders and celebrities including the Oscar awardee A. R. Rahman.

== See also ==
- Architecture of Chennai
- Heritage structures in Chennai
