= Hijron Ka Khanqah =

15th-century mosque and tomb in South Delhi, India

Hijron ka Khanqah
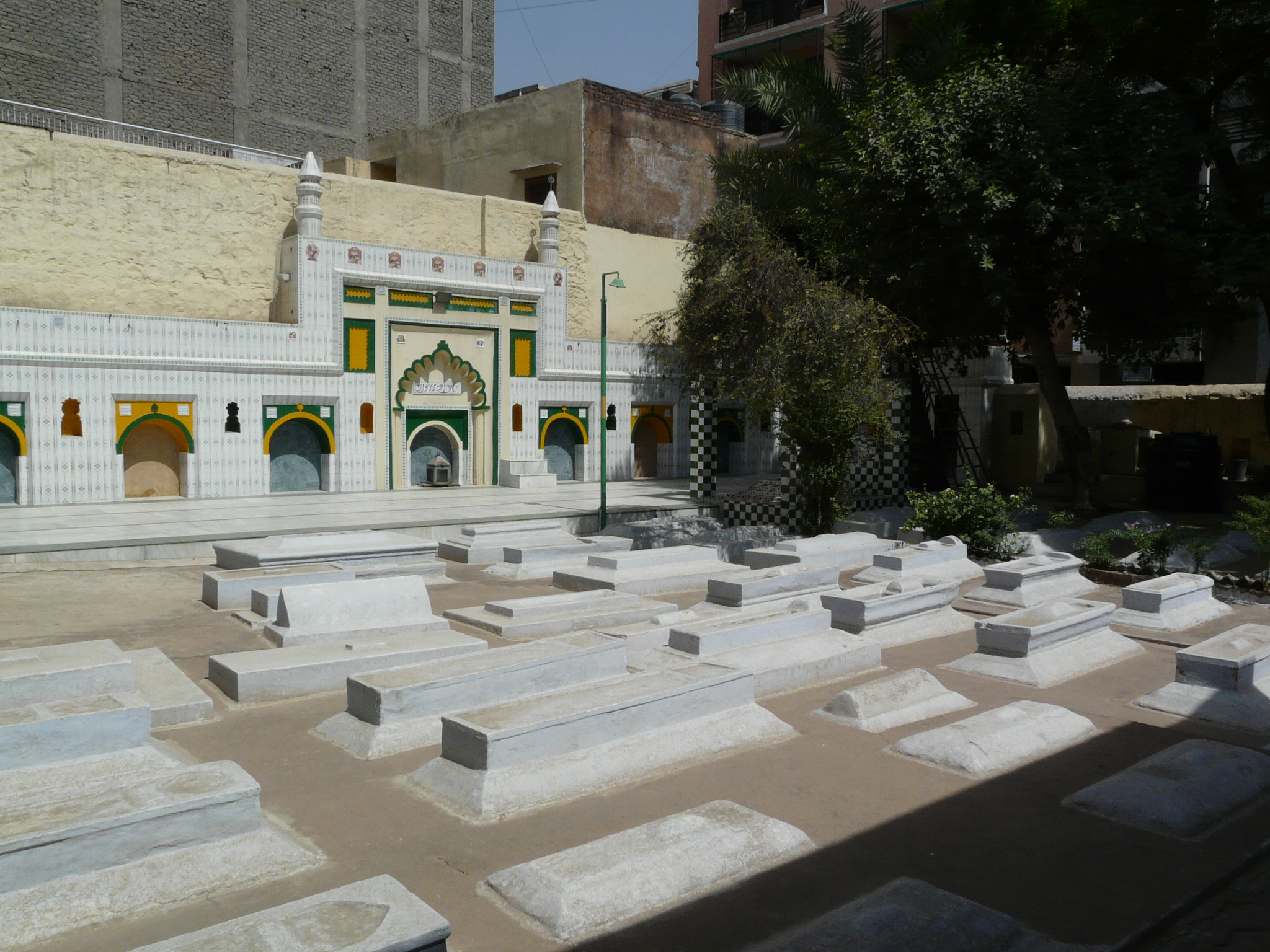
- The wall, mosque and tombs

- Location of the mosque and tomb in Delhi

Religion
- Affiliation: Sunni Islam
- Rite: Sufism
- Ecclesiastical or organizational status: Khanqah, mosque, and tombs
- Status: Active

Location
- Location: Mehrauli, South Delhi, Delhi NCT
- Country: India
- Interactive map of Hijron ka Khanqah
- Coordinates: 28°31′19″N 77°10′43″E

Architecture
- Type: Mosque architecture
- Founder: Sikandar Khan Lodi
- Completed: 15th century
- Materials: Sandstone

The Hijron Ka Khanqah is a Sufi Khanqah complex, comprising a mosque and tombs, located in Mehrauli, South Delhi, India. Built in the 15th century, it is one of the many monuments located in the Mehrauli village within the archeological park.

The complex is maintained well by the Hijras of Turkman Gate, in Shahjahanabad (present day Old Delhi) who are in possession of this monument since the 20th century.

== Nomenclature ==
The literal meaning of Hijron ka Khanqah is a "Sufi spiritual retreat for eunuchs", with the word hijron (plural of hijra) more widely referring to a specific community of transgender women throughout the Indian subcontinent.

Khanqah is a Persian word that connotes a religious edifice where Muslims of the Sufi tradition assemble to achieve spiritual peace and character building.

Hijron Ka Khanqah is a pre-Mughal, Lodi period, monument dated from the 15th century known for the serene atmosphere that exists at the monument where some eunuchs of Delhi were buried during the Lodi dynasty's reign. It is also said that Hijras of Turkman Gate who own this monument now visit the place on religious days to distribute food to the poor.

== Hijras ==
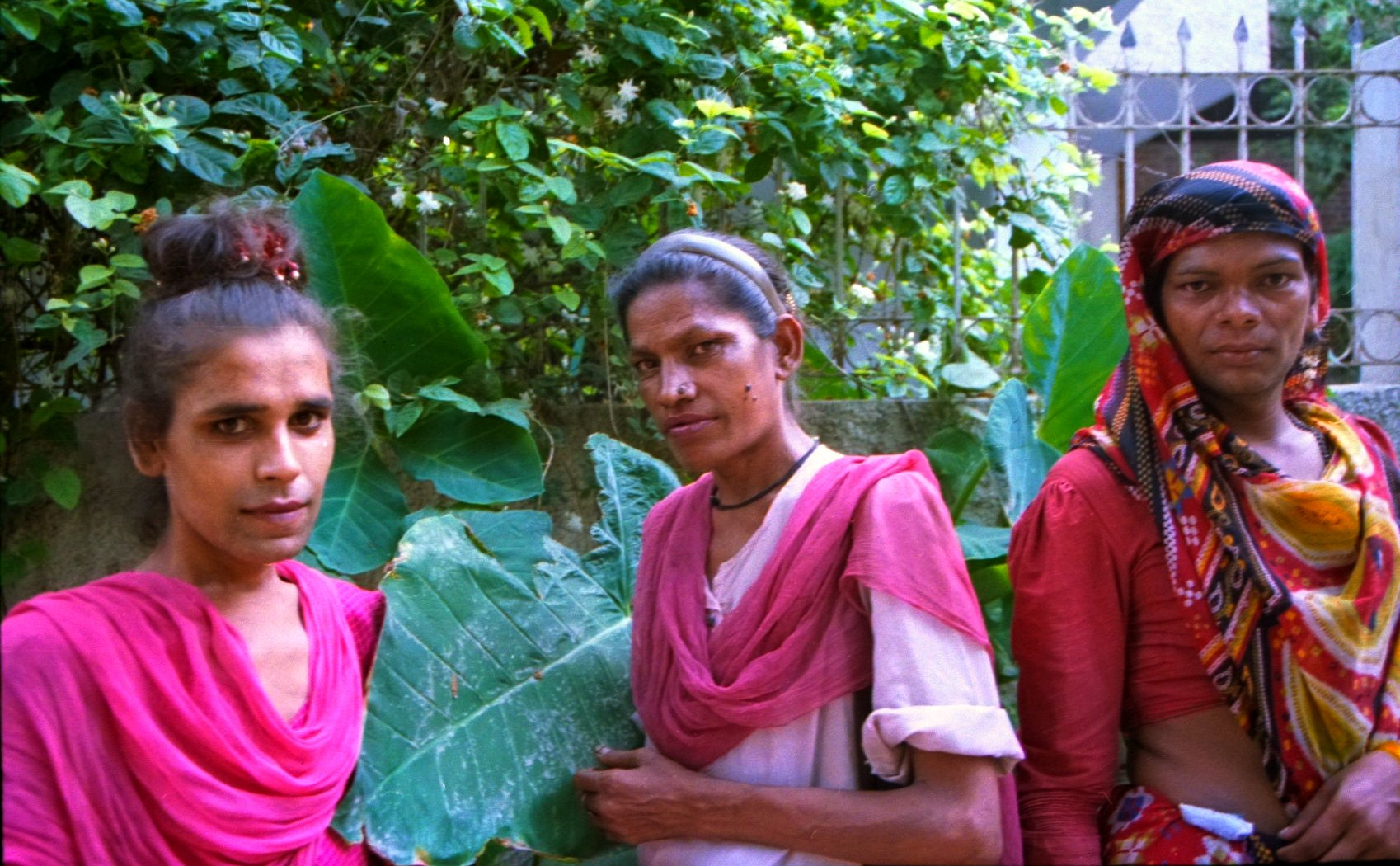
Hijras of Delhi

Hijra generally describes the self-organised spiritual and social community (from either the Hindu or Muslim religious traditions) of transgender women in North India, while in a historical sense it can also denote eunuchs in the Western sense of the word (as males who have been castrated and who serve as members of a royal or noble court). Both eunuchs and hijra are described in South Asian history and literature. The ancient Hindu epic Mahabharata literature features a eunuch (castrated servant) named as Shikhandi, while the treasurer during the reign of Allauddin Khalji in the early 14th century CE is said to have been a eunuch, and the Mughal Emperor Aurengzeb is said to have engaged a eunuch to harass his father, Shahjahan, while the latter was being held in captivity. Meanwhile, the Hijra (transgender) community is associated with the imperial court of the Mughal Empire.

The Hijra are a well organized transgender community, considered by some as a "religious cult" in the sociological sense of the word. Many members of the community describe themselves as belonging to a third gender, and are recognised as such by the governments of Pakistan, India, and Bangladesh. They are a highly visible community in North India, especially as their presence in marriage functions and at the birth of a child in a house are considered auspicious. Such a presence is also one of their source of livelihood. During family functions, they are even invited to dance, sing, clown, do typical drumming and bless the newly weds and the newborn. Though, not specifically enumerated census data is available of their numbers, an estimate puts this figure at approximately 50,000 in Mumbai and Delhi.

== Structure ==
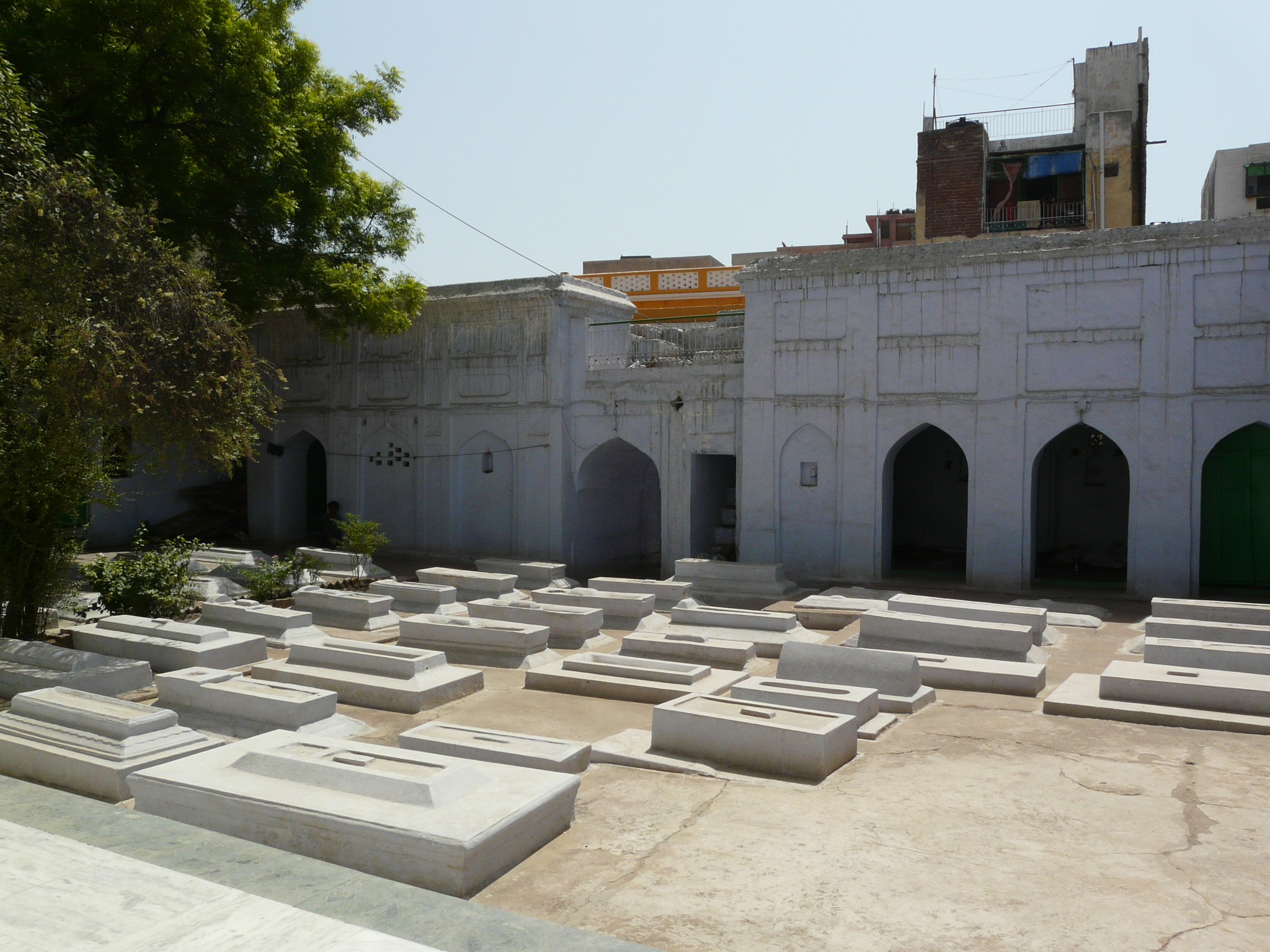
Tombs of eunuchs at Hijron ka Khanqah

After entering the premises of the monument through a narrow gate, marble steps lead to a large patio where white colored tombs are seen. There is a small terrace adjoining the tombs. The tombs are enclosed on the west in the prayer direction by a wall mosque.

Of the many white painted tombs of Hijras or eunuchs located at the complex, the main tomb held in reverence is stated to be of a hijra called Miyan Saheb.

The complex is approached through a small gate from the narrow and winding main street of Mehrauli village. Entry to the tomb is restricted. Mehrauli village located in South Delhi is well connected by road, rail and air to all parts of the country. The nearest rail head is the New Delhi Railway Station, which is 18 kilometres (11 mi) away. The Delhi International Airport is 17 kilometres (11 mi) away. The monument is located in a narrow lane called 'Chatta Wali Gali' in ward no 6 of main Mehrauli road.

== See also ==
- Islam in India
- List of mosques in India
