= Turkman gate demolition and rioting =

1976 police killing of protestors in Delhi, India

Coordinates: 28.642231°N 77.232591°E

Turkman Gate incident
- Part of The Emergency of 1975–1977
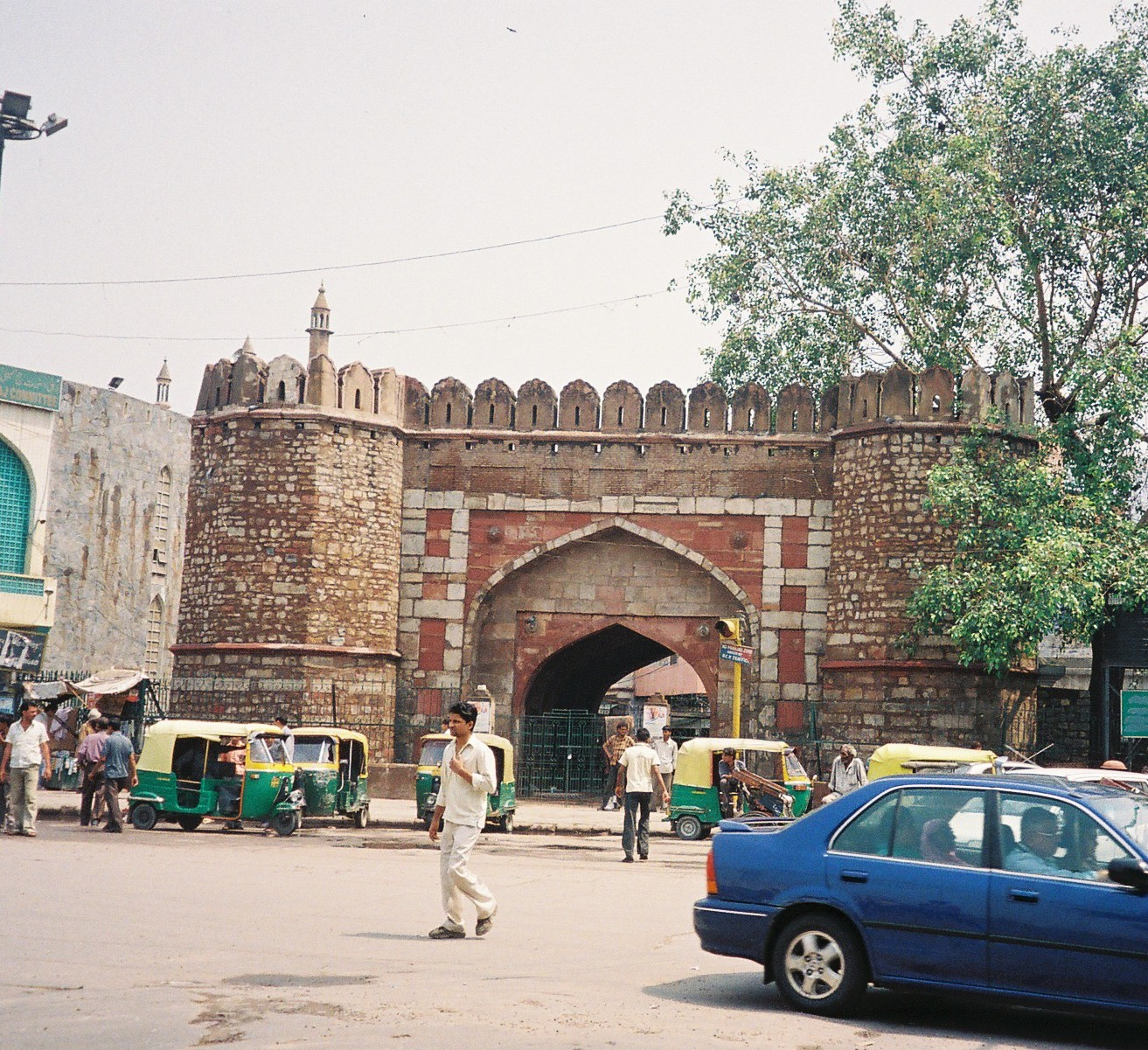
- An image of Turkman Gate
- Date: 31 May 1976; 50 years ago
- Location: Turkman Gate, Old Delhi
- Caused by: Political repression and police brutality
- Goals: Demolition of Turkman Gate
- Methods: Rioting, protests and demonstrations

Parties
Authority
Government of India
- Delhi Police
Civilians
Residing people

Lead figures
| Sanjay Gandhi | |

Casualties
- Deaths: 6 (Official); 8-20+ (Police source); 12(Independent researchers)

The Turkman gate demolition and subsequent massacre was an infamous case of political oppression and police brutality during the Emergency when, on 31 May 1976, residents of Old Delhi were killed by police while protesting a slum clearance. An official account of the number of people killed at Turkman gate is not available and a media blackout ensued in the wake of the massacre. One local guide claimed that nine of his friends were killed by the police. More than ten bulldozers razed illegal structures and homes, and protestors were fired upon by police.

== Background ==
During the Emergency, Indira Gandhi's government, prompted by her son Sanjay, launched the demolition drive to clear the Delhi municipality of slums and force poor residents to leave Delhi and move to distant settlements. The residents of Turkman Gate refused to move as they had occupied this internal area of the walled city since the Mughal period and would have to commute every day, paying high bus fares, to reach the city and earn their living. They resisted the bulldozing of their houses. On 18 April 1976, the police opened fire on protesters, killing several of them. The government, which had earlier imposed censorship, ordered the press not to report the massacre. The Indian public learned of the killings through foreign media outlets, such as the BBC. It was later reported that protesters were run over by bulldozers, resulting in several deaths.

== Total deaths ==
After the incident the police admitted to six deaths: Om Prakash, a CPI(ML) activist who led the rioting, and five Muslim residents of the locality. ASI Govind Ram Bhatia admitted to Shah Commission that eight individuals had actually been killed. Officer Rajesh Sharma, who had issued the firing order to the CRPF, claimed that at least 20 people died in the shooting. Independent researchers, John Dayal and Ajoy Bose, in their book on the Emergency in Delhi, put the death toll at 12.

== See also ==
- Operation Blue Star
- Bulldozer politics
- List of massacres in India
