= Delhi Gate, Delhi =

Historical Place Situated in Delhi

Delhi Gate
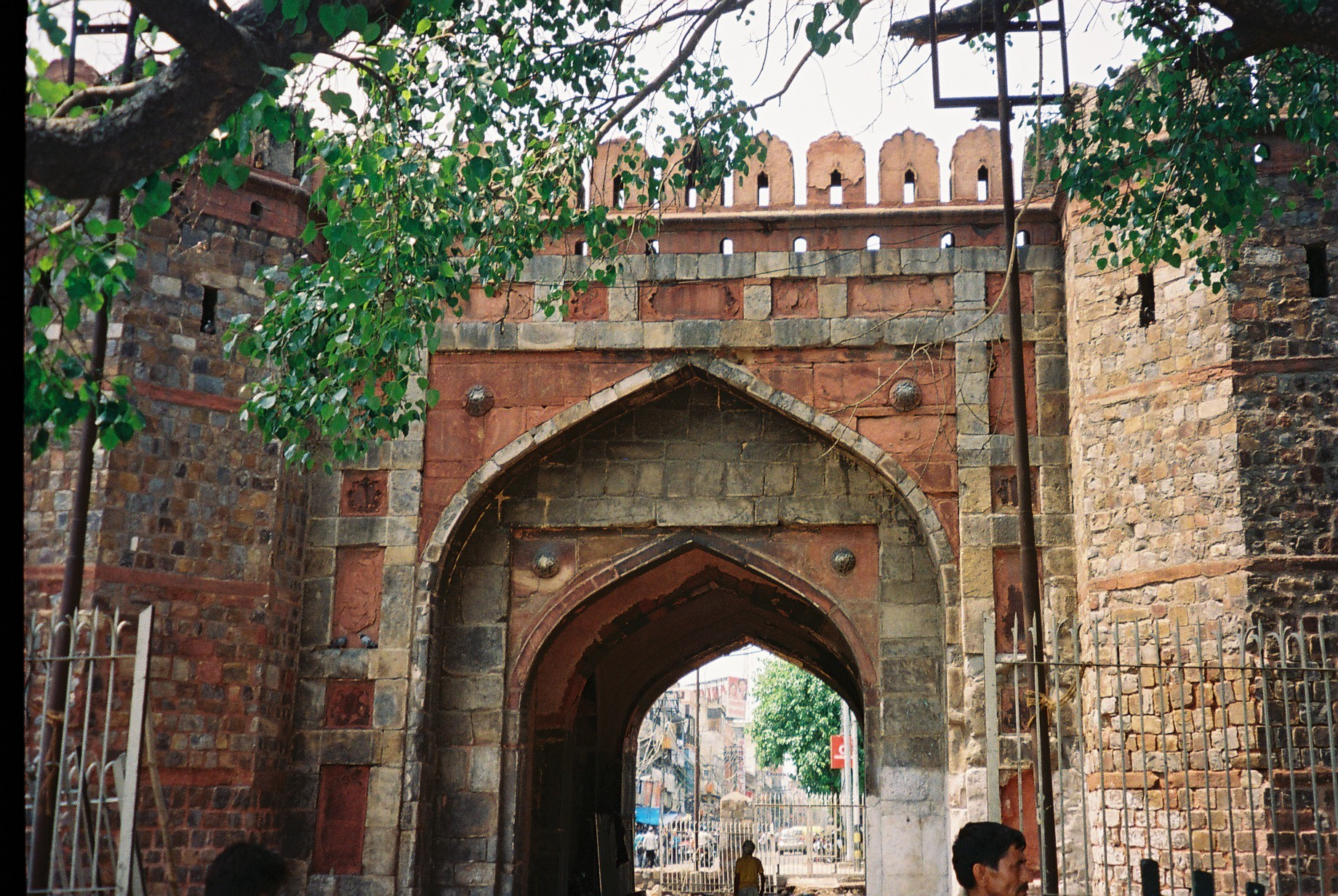
- Delhi Gate links Daryaganj of Old Delhi with New Delhi
- Interactive map of Delhi Gate
- 28.64122°N 77.24059°E
- Location: Delhi, India

Delhi Gate is the southern gate in the historic walled city of Delhi, or Shahjahanabad in 1638 AD. The gate links the New Delhi city with the old walled city of Delhi. It stands in the middle of the road, at the end of Netaji Subhash Chandra Road (or Netaji Subhash Marg), at the edge of Daryaganj.

== History ==
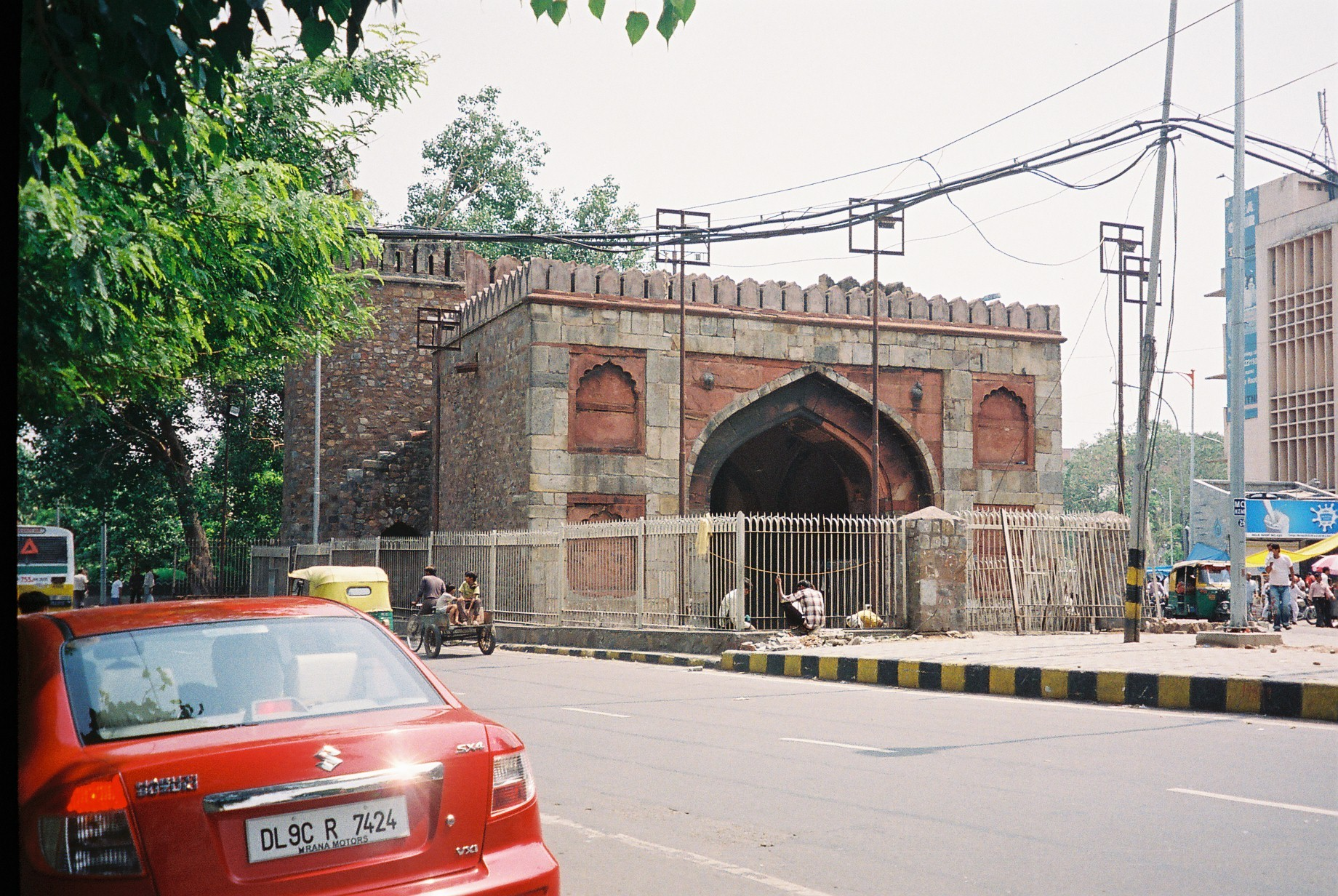
View of Delhi Gate from Old Delhi side

The Gate was built by Emperor Shah Jahan in 1638 as part of the rubble– built high fort walls that encircled the Shahjahanabad, the seventh city of Delhi. The emperor used this gate to go to the Jama Masjid for prayer.

== Architecture ==
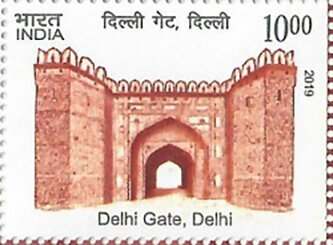
2019 Indian postage stamp depicting the Delhi Gate, Delhi, from the "Historic Gates of Indian Forts and Monuments" commemorative series.

The gate is similar in design and architecture to the northern gate of the walled city, the Kashmiri Gate (1853). It was built in sandstone and is an impressive and large structure. Near the gate entry, two stone carvings of elephants were erected.

The road from this gate passes through Daryaganj leading to the Kashmiri gate. A part of the fort wall to the east has been demolished to build the Old Delhi Railway Station while the wall to the west exists.

The gate is now a heritage site maintained by the Archaeological Survey of India.

== See also ==
- Gates of Delhi
- Monuments of National Importance in Delhi
