= Shah Commission =

1977–78 Indian inquiry into the Emergency

Shah Commission was a commission of inquiry appointed by Government of India in 1977 to inquire into all the excesses committed in the Indian Emergency (1975 - 77). It was headed by Justice J.C. Shah, a former chief Justice of India.

== Background ==
The Emergency of 25 June 1975 – 21 March 1977 was a 21-month period when President Fakhruddin Ali Ahmed, upon advice by Prime Minister Indira Gandhi, declared a national emergency under Article 352 of the Constitution of India, effectively bestowing on her the power to rule by decree, suspending elections and civil liberties. It is one of the most controversial times in the history of independent India. On 23 January 1977, Mrs Indira Gandhi called elections for March and released all political prisoners. In the elections held on 16–20 March 1977 Congress Party suffered a defeat at the hands of the Janata Party, which took office on 24 March 1977.

== Process ==
The government appointed the commission on 28 May 1977 under Section 3 of the Commissions of Inquiry Act, 1952. The commission was to report by 31 December 1977, but was later given an extension to 30 June 1978. Justice Shah was insistent that the commission should complete its work quickly rather than dragging on endlessly like other commissions. He set a deadline of 3 July 1977 as the last date on which complaints could be filed. Complaints were categorized, with some being investigated by commission staff and the more important ones being handled through open hearings.

Starting on 29 September 1977 the commission began hearing oral evidence of witnesses. In these hearings, where everyone testifying was allowed legal representation, the commission tried to follow much the same approach as a courtroom. Many people gave evidence. Some people who were asked to give evidence declined, or after initial appearances refused to give further evidence. Indira Gandhi disputed the legality of the commission and refused to file any statement. Katherine Frank said in her biography of Indira Gandhi that the former prime minister was unwilling to cooperate during the deposition. J.C. Shah lost patience after three days of patient questioning and reprimanded her. Indira Gandhi used the Shah commission as a forum to present herself as a victim of persecution, and this was reinforced when the government first arrested and then released her.

The Shah commission was later criticized for confusing investigation with inquiry. It had issued notices requesting testimony on oath without telling the requested party what case they were being asked to meet. It was on this grounds that Indira Gandhi and Pranab Mukherjee refused to depose on oath, and this was the reason why a complaint for contempt by the commission was rejected by a magistrate.

== Findings ==
The commission published its report on the illegal events during the emergency and the persons responsible in three volumes totaling 525 pages. The first interim report was submitted on 11 March 1978, dealing with the lead-up to the declaration of the Emergency and the way in which the press was prevented from speaking out. The second interim report discussed police actions and the role of Sanjay Gandhi at the Turkman Gate incident in which police fired on a crowd of people protesting against demolition of their houses. The final report was issued on 6 August 1978 and covered prison conditions, torture and family planning atrocities.

Concerning the circumstances in which the emergency was proclaimed, the commission found that there was no economic crisis and no crisis of law and order. The commission decided that the decision to impose Emergency was made by prime minister Indira Gandhi alone, without consulting her cabinet colleagues, and was not justified. The report was particularly scathing of Indira Gandhi, her son Sanjay Gandhi, Pranab Mukherjee, Bansi Lal, Kamal Nath and officers belonging to civil services who helped Sanjay Gandhi.

The commission concluded that during the Emergency the provisions of the Maintenance of Internal Security Act and the Defence of India Rules were not followed but were abused in order to damage political opponents. In Chapter XV of the 26 April 1978 Interim Report the Commission said: "The decision to arrest and release certain persons were entirely on political considerations which were intended to be favourable to the ruling party. Employing the police to the advantage of one party is a sure source of subverting the rule of law".

The report found that most Indian Administrative Service officers accepted orders even though they thought these orders were improper and had political motives. It said "Even the cream of the talent in the country in the administrative field often collapses at the slightest pressure". It described cases of IAS officers practicing "forging of records, fabrication of ground[s] of detention, ante-dating detention orders, and callous disregard of the rights of detainees as regards revocation, parole, etc." The overall picture is that the civil servants felt that they had to show loyalty to the party in power in order to advance their careers. The commission found that vagabonds and beggars were forced into sterilization clinics during the emergency by Youth Congress workers and the police. Auto-rickshaw drivers had to show a sterilization certificate to get their license renewed.

== Results ==
In May 1978, after the second interim report of the commission had been issued, some leaders of the Janata party began demanding that special courts be set up to ensure speedy trial of cases related to the emergency. Parliament eventually passed an act establishing two special courts on 8 May 1979. However, it was too late. The government fell on 16 July 1979. After Indira Gandhi returned to power in a landslide election victory in January 1980, the Supreme Court found that the special courts were not legally constituted, so no trials were conducted. Several of the officials indicted by the Shah commission went on to have successful careers. On 23 June 1980, Indira Gandhi's son Sanjay Gandhi died in the plane crash.

As per Hewitt, Indira Gandhi attempted to recall copies of the report wherever possible. However, suppression was not successful. Era Sezhian, an Indian parliamentarian republished his copy of the report in a book form called "Shah Commission Report - Lost and Regained". A copy of the report of the commission is held by National Library of Australia.

In an interview with TV Eye in 1978, Indira Gandhi responded that the Shah commission had been biased and its findings were untrue. She defended her opinion on the grounds that Justice Shah had already spoken against many policies of her government including the nationalization of banks, and that much of the information regarding her perceived authoritativeness was untrue. She also claimed that there had been clear evidence of the danger of destabilization both from within India as well as from external agencies, which necessitated her writing to the President, asking for permission to impose a state of emergency. However, in an article in Frontline, A.G. Noorani contended that by 1970, the government had commenced trying to exert pressure on the courts to support the government's stance in various matters, and that Justice Shah had been against this.
