= Gates of Delhi =

Historical monuments in Delhi

Gates of Delhi

Ajmeri Gate, one of the surviving gateways of Shahjahanabad

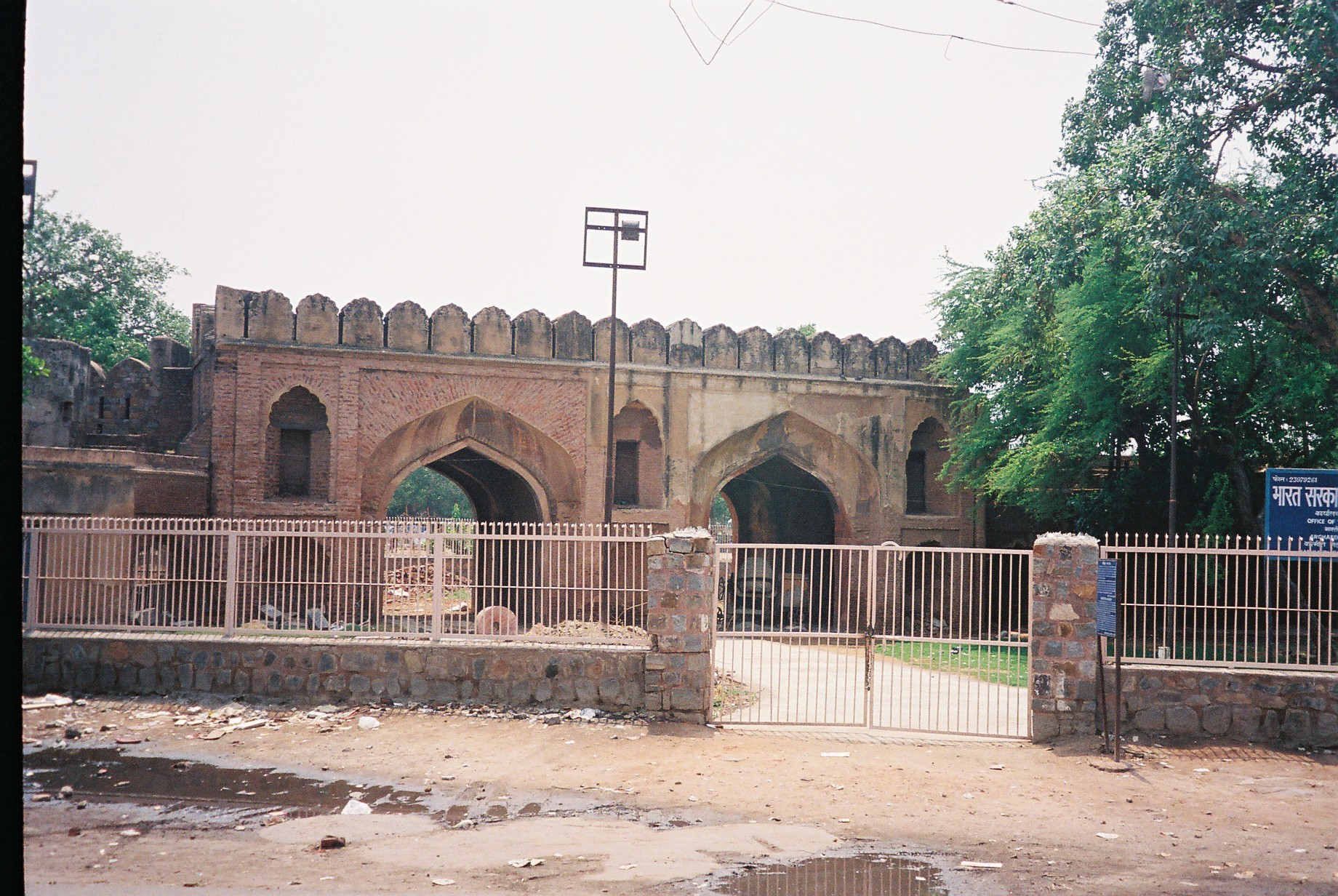
Kashmiri Gate

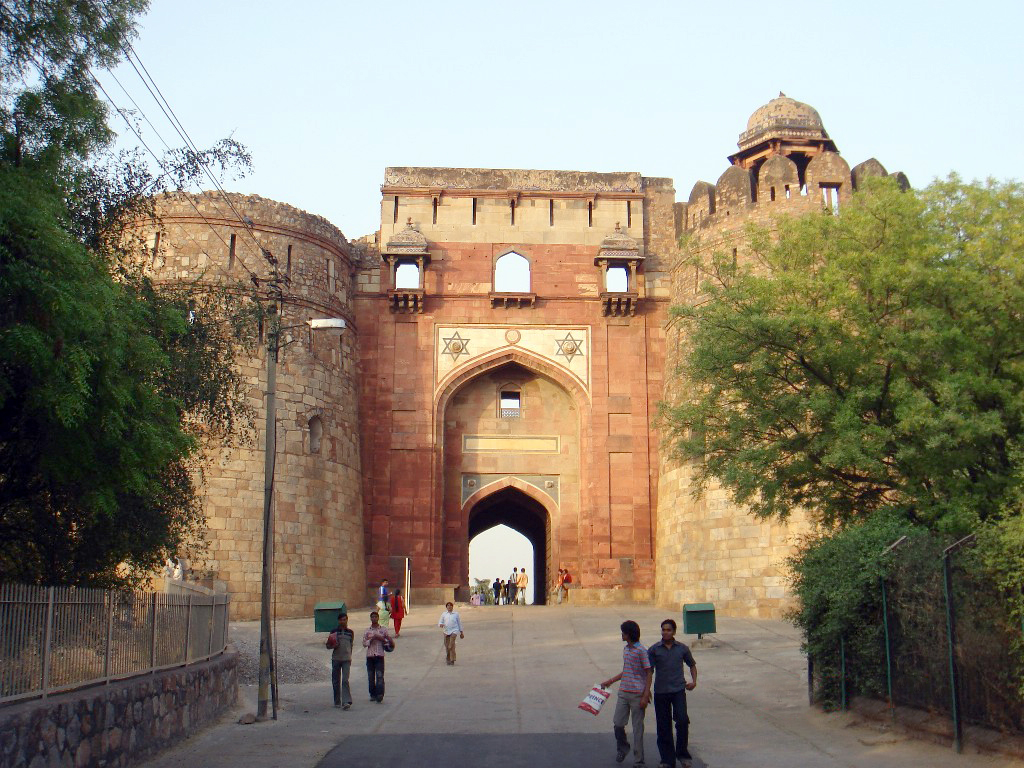
West Gate: Purana Qila

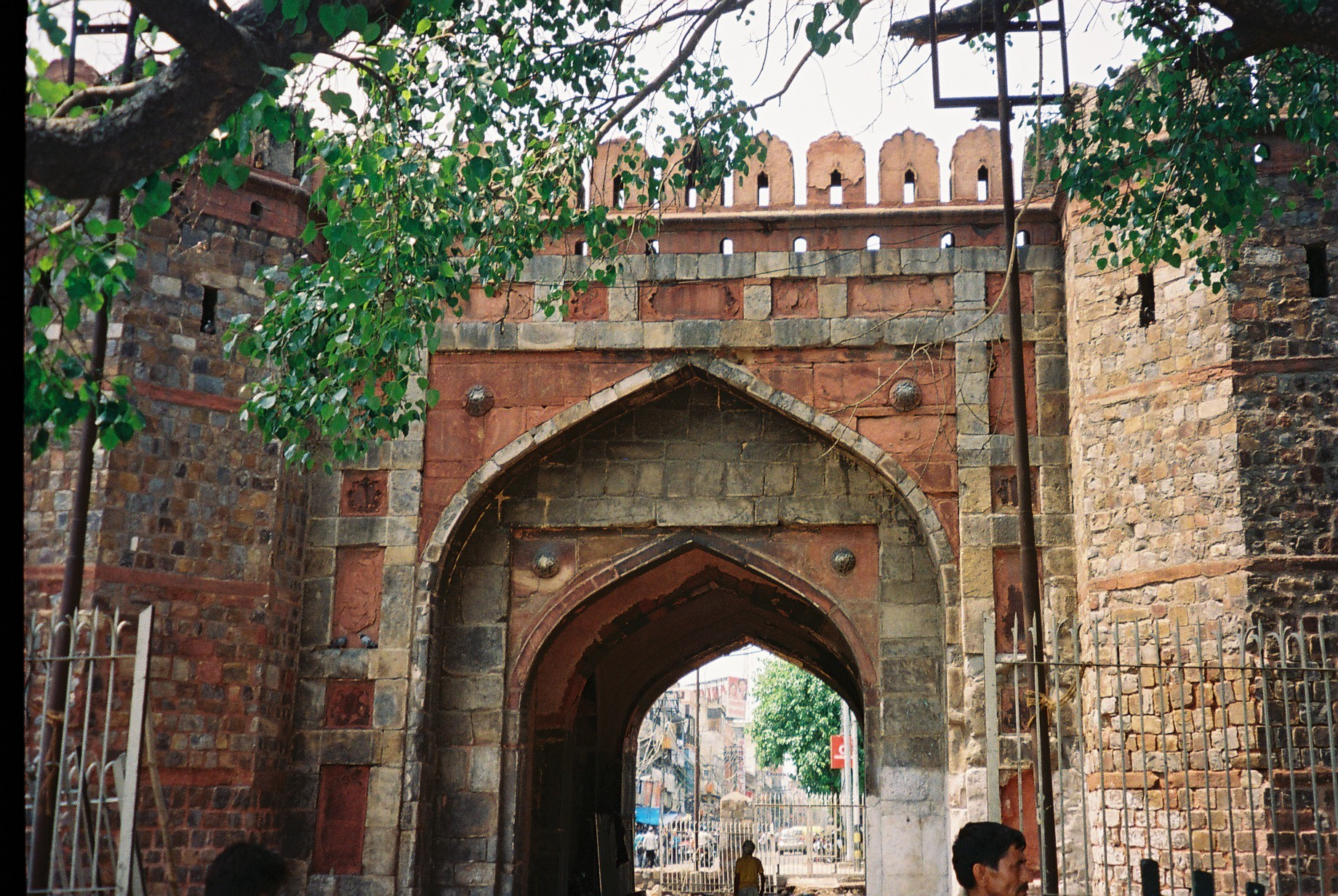
Delhi Gate

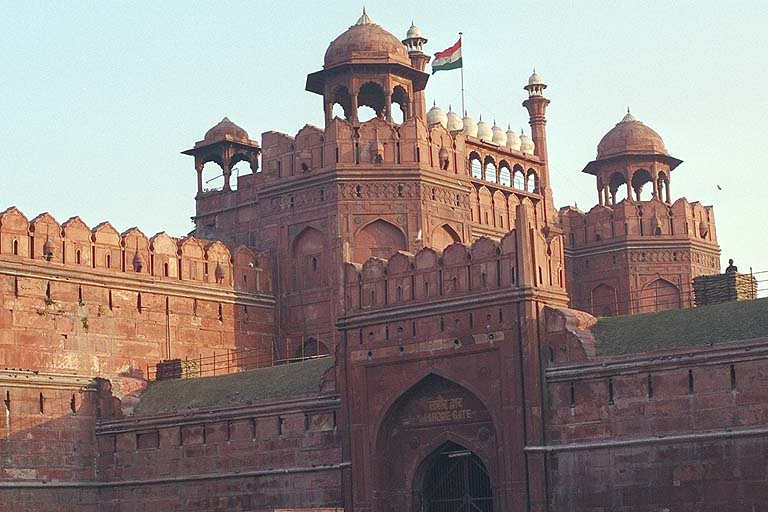
Lahori Gate, Red Fort

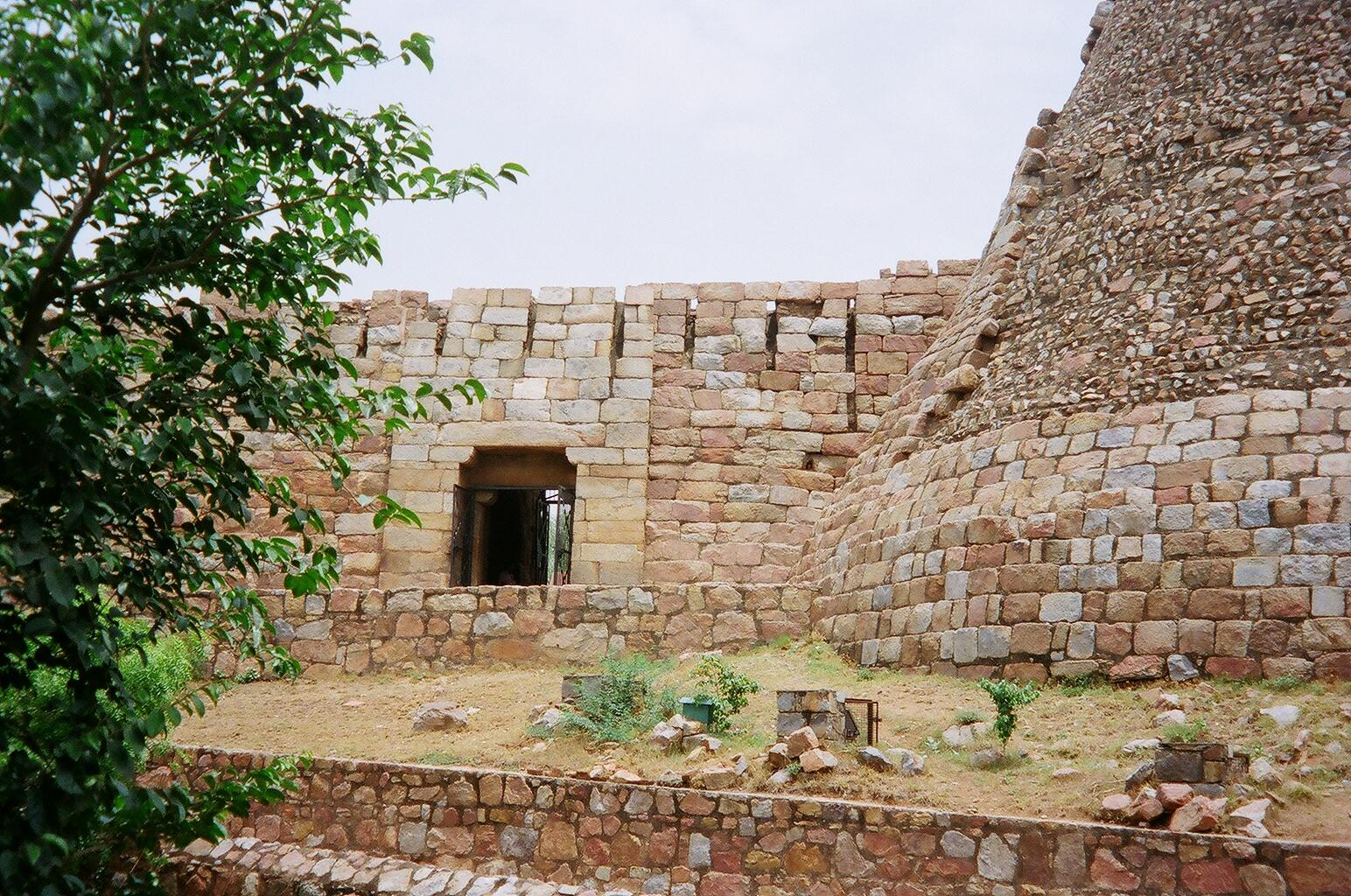
Entrance to Tughlaqabad fort

The gates of Delhi are historic gateways associated with the fortified cities, citadels and defensive walls built in and around Delhi, India. They include entrances to Lal Kot and Qila Rai Pithora, Siri, Tughlaqabad, Jahanpanah, Firozabad, Purana Qila and Shahjahanabad. These settlements were developed under successive ruling dynasties, and their surviving fortifications form part of Delhi's architectural heritage.

The gateways controlled access through defensive walls and connected the settlements with surrounding roads and regions. Some were named after destinations, such as Kashmir, Ajmer and Lahore. Although numerous gateways have been demolished or survive only as ruins, others remain standing, particularly in the historic walled city of Shahjahanabad.

== Lal Kot and Qila Rai Pithora ==
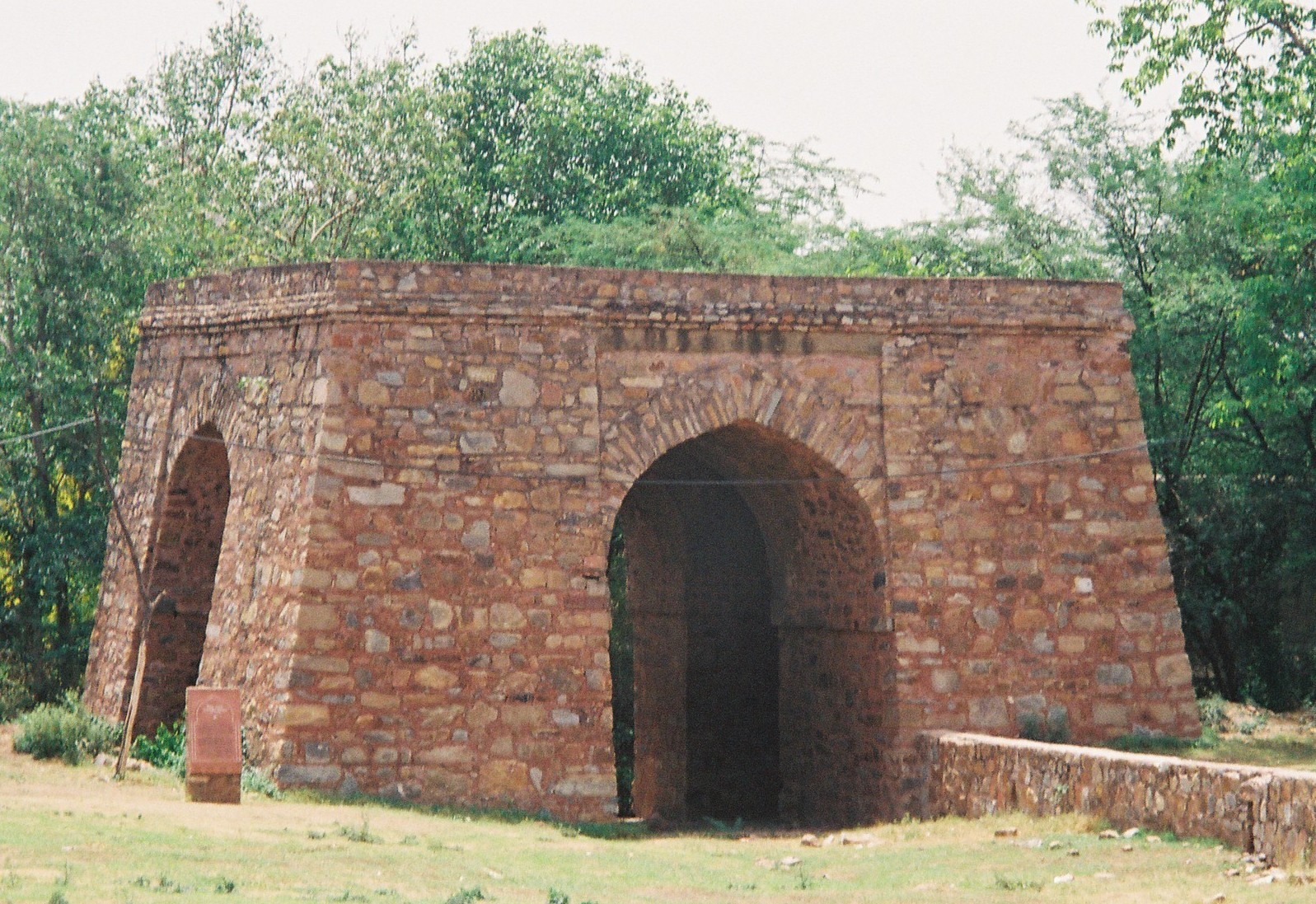
Restored Chaumukha Darwaza near the Qutb complex, associated with the fortifications of Lal Kot.

The fortifications of Lal Kot and its extension, Qila Rai Pithora, formed part of Delhi's first medieval city, which had 13 gates. Following the Ghurid conquest in the late 12th century, Qutb ud-Din Aibak governed the region on behalf of Muhammad of Ghor before establishing the Mamluk (Slave) dynasty in 1206. These were in the rubble-built ramparts of Lal Kot (5–6 m (16–20 ft) thickness) of which only a few remain, either in ruins or under renovation. These are the Chaumukha, Sohan, Ranjit, Fateh, Hauz Rani, Barka, Badaun, and Budayuni gates. Of these, the Chaumukha, Ranjit, Sohan, and Fateh Darwaza have been listed by the INTACH as heritage monuments. The ruins of Hauz Rani and Barka are seen around the remains between giant gaps in the long stretches of the Lal Kot wall, surrounded by a wide moat on the outside. Archaeological Survey of India (ASI) has proposed to conserve all the identified gates.

The Chaumukha Darwaza (Chaumukha in Hindi language means four faces) is inferred as the gateway of Lal Kot since it aligns with Lal Kot walls. It is near the Qutb Complex and has been categorized as Grade B in archaeological value. It has been conserved by the ASI. The gate's architectural style is traced to the Tuglaq period in view of its massive thickness. It has a "horned" outwork with paved stones in an engraved grid pattern that indicates that it was designed for defense purposes. The purpose for which it was built has not been discerned. Hence, it has also been conjectured that it could have been built by Thomas Metcalfe as one of his follies, close to his original 'Dilkusha' mansion (now seen in ruins) to enhance the elegance of his retreat.

The Ranjit gate towards the north wall of Lal Kot is in ruins. It was once considered as a grand gate through which the Turks had entered the city. Hence, it was subsequently fortified to prevent any further foreign incursions. Only part of the gate is visible and is yet to be listed as a heritage monument.

The Fateh Gate close to Fateh Burj has convoluted features and is about 24 m (79 ft) in diameter. The Sohan Gate guarded by a large bastion called the Sohan Burj was stated to be the location of a Sun temple.

The Hauz Rani and Budayuni gates survive only as ruins.

== Siri ==
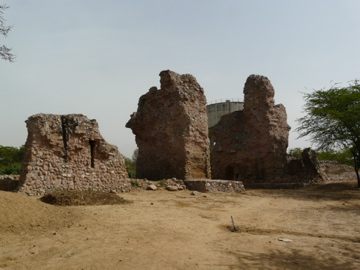
Southern Gate of Siri Fort in ruins

Siri was founded in 1303 by Alauddin Khalji as a fortified capital of the Delhi Sultanate. The roughly oval city was enclosed by defensive walls and originally had seven gates. Although much of its fortifications have been lost, sections of the walls, bastions and gateways survive. Archaeological investigations by the Archaeological Survey of India uncovered previously buried sections of the fortifications, including additional gateways, near Shahpur Jat.

== Tughlaqabad ==
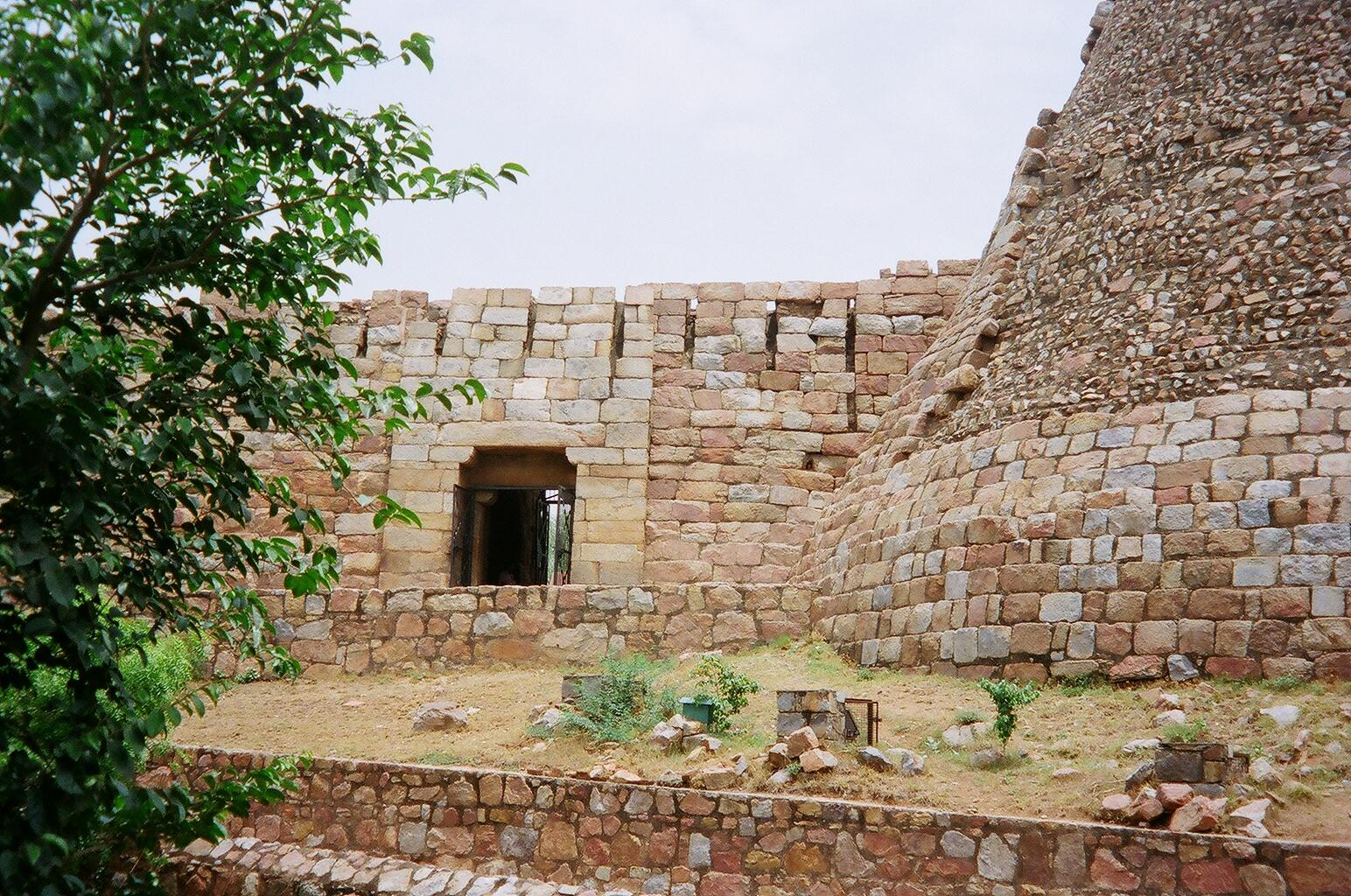
Entry gate to Tughlaqabad fort and Palace

Tughlaqabad, the third city of medieval Delhi, built by Ghazi Malik is well known as Ghiyath al-Din Tughluq who established the Tughlaq Dynasty in 1321 after ousting the Khaljis, was enclosed within a fort of massive proportions completed in a short span of four years. The fort has inclined walls with triple storied citadels, enormous towers, mosques, and halls. The city when built is stated to have had 52 gates but only 13 remain today, mostly in ruins. Of the remaining gates, the main entry gate to the fort was built in typical Pathan style, which is described as made of red sandstone with sloping face and jambs which merge well with the towers of the fort. Following the death of Ghiyath al-Din Tughluq, Tughlaqabad was abandoned. Its decline has been attributed to factors including water scarcity and the transfer of the capital to Daulatabad under his successor, Muhammad bin Tughluq.

== Jahanpanah ==
Jahanpanah was established by Muhammad bin Tughluq in the late 1320s as a fortified settlement linking the inhabited areas between Qila Rai Pithora and Siri. Its defensive walls enclosed a substantial part of the surrounding territory.

Historical accounts describe 13 gates in Jahanpanah's fortifications, with six in the western wall and seven in the eastern wall. One was known as the Maidan Gate, situated on the western side near an old Eidgah. Although much of the fortification system has disappeared, scattered stretches of its rubble-masonry walls survive, including remains near Shaikh Sarai.

== Firozabad ==
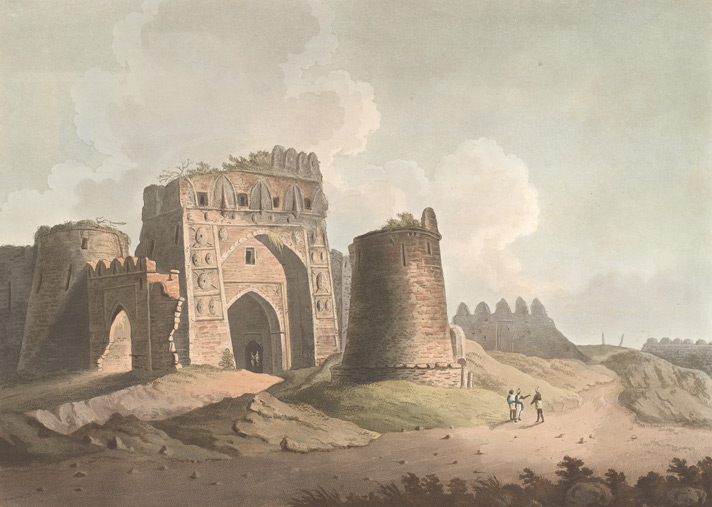
The western gateway of Firozabad, depicted in an 1802 aquatint based on a drawing by Thomas Daniell.

Firozabad was established beside the Yamuna in the mid-14th century by Firuz Shah Tughlaq. Its fortified citadel, Feroz Shah Kotla, was enclosed by defensive walls and had a principal gateway flanked by bastions. Portions of the citadel's walls, bastions and gateways survive.

== Dinpanah and Shergarh ==
Bara Darwaza & Talaqi Darwaza

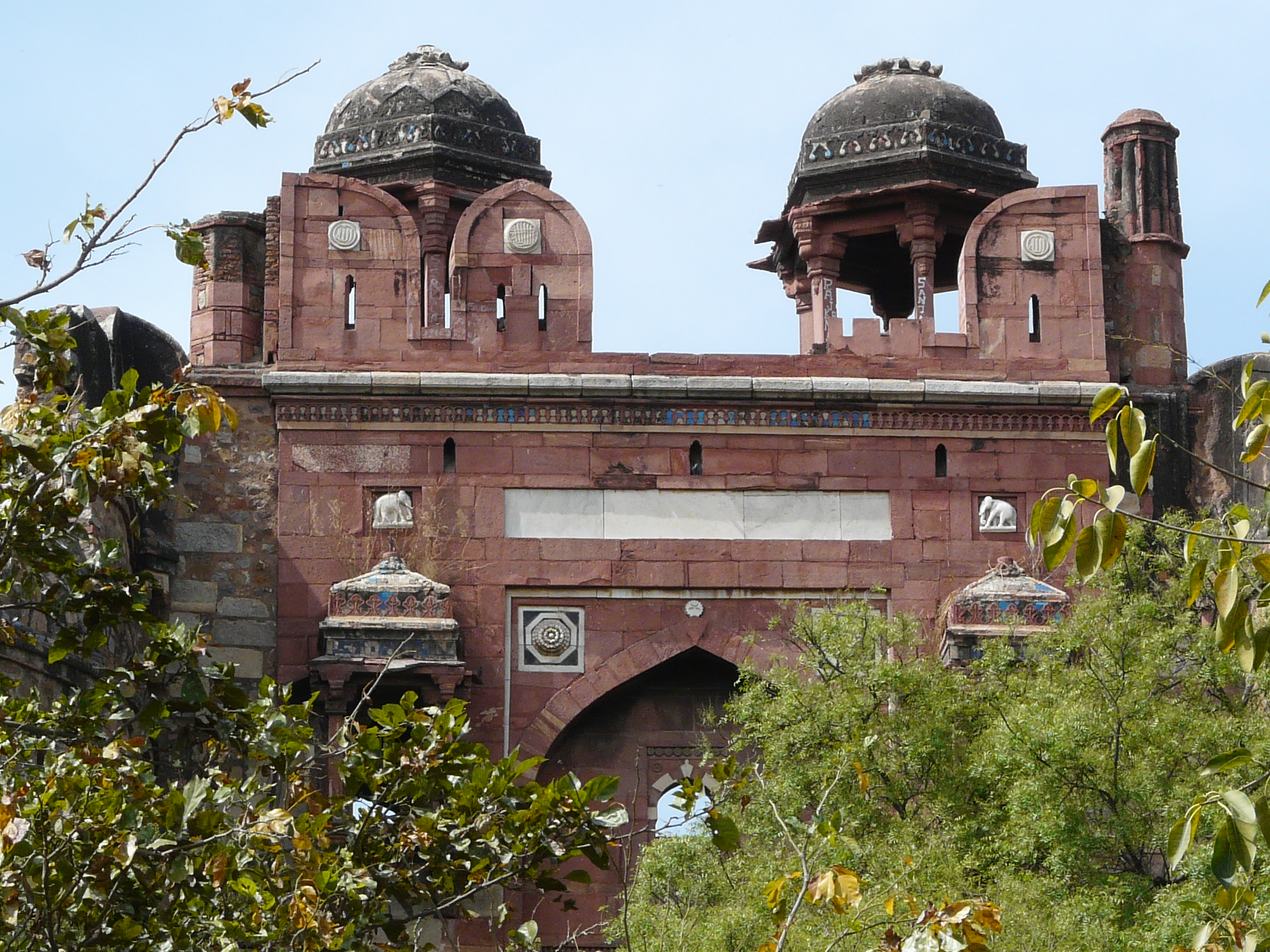
South Gate Purana Qila

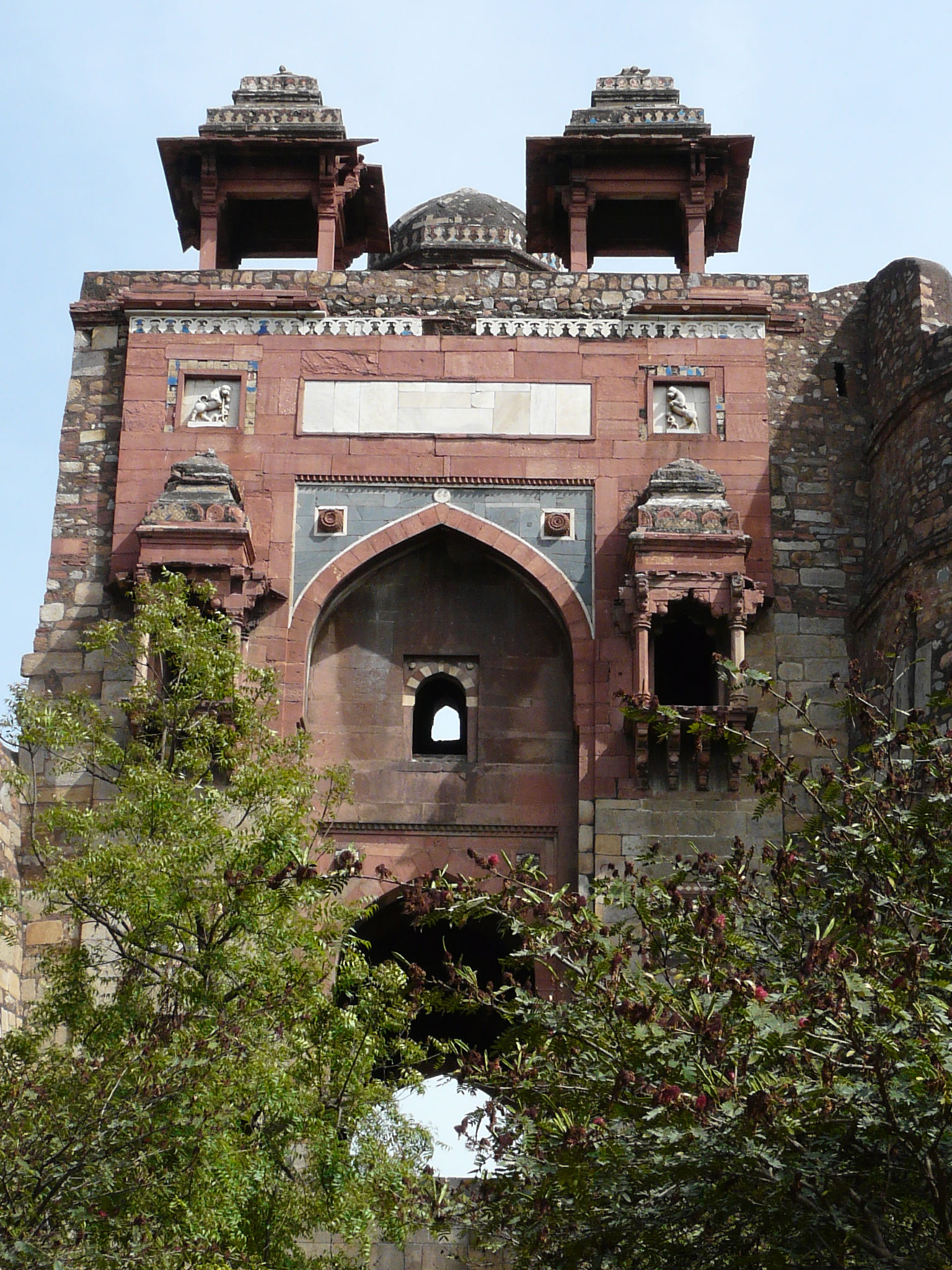
View of Talaqi Darwaza of Purana Qila

The gateways of Purana Qila are associated with the fortified city of Dinpanah, established by the Mughal emperor Humayun in 1533. Following his defeat of Humayun in 1540, Sher Shah Suri developed the site as Shergarh. Three principal gateways survive in the fortifications: the western Bara Darwaza (Great Gate), the northern Talaqi Darwaza (Forbidden Gate) and the southern Humayun Darwaza. The Bara Darwaza remains the main entrance to the fort. All three gateways are double-storeyed sandstone structures flanked by semicircular bastions. Their architectural decoration includes marble inlays, coloured tiles, projecting balconies and pillared pavilions known as chhatris.

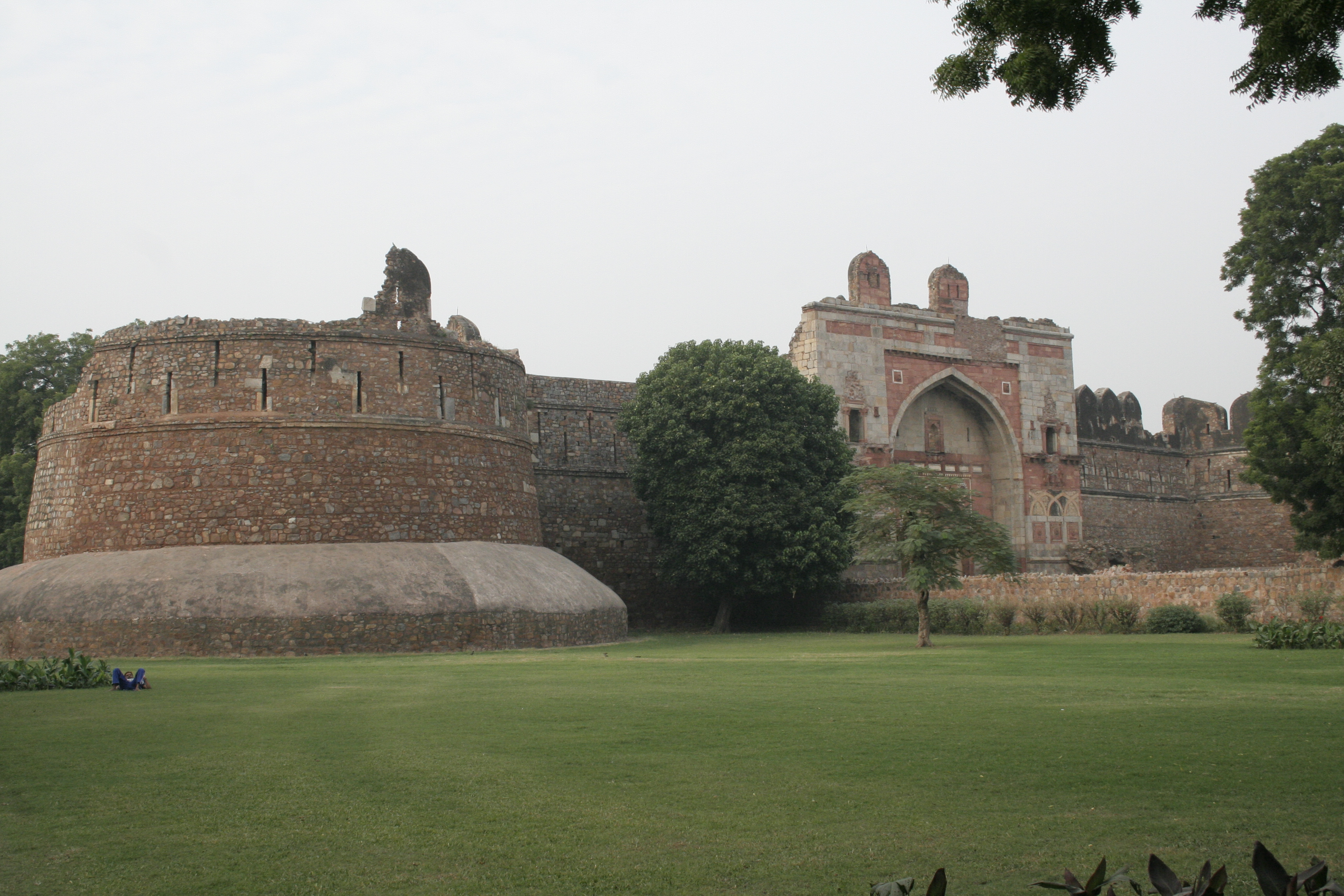
Sher Shah Gate

=== Sher Shah Gate ===
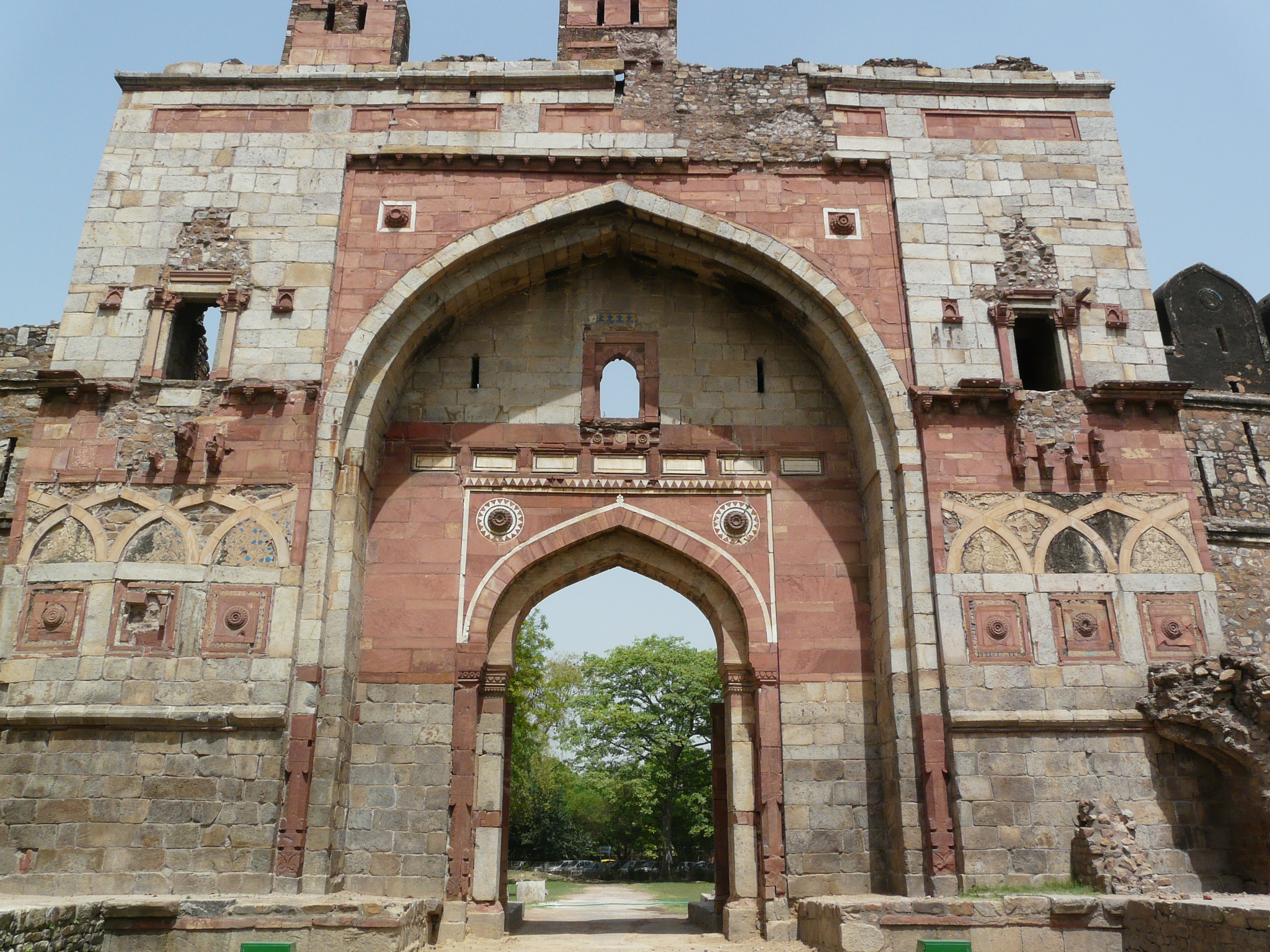
Sher Shah gate or Lal Darwaza

Sher Shah gate located to the south of Khairu’l-Manazil-Masjid is said to be an entrance to the large city of Delhi that Sher Shah built in front of his fortress of Purana Qila. The gate, mostly built with red sandstone but with use of local grey quartzite in its upper storey, is thus called the Lal Darwaza (red gate). Arcades were built from this gate into the city, which were provided with series of dwellings with frontage of a verandah, which may have been used for commercial establishments. Kabuli or Khuni–Darwaza (explained in the following section) is another gate on the fringes of Sher Shah's city. ASI has undertaken extensive conservation works of the gate and its surroundings at a cost of Rs 7.5 million (US$150,000).

=== Khooni Gate ===
Khooni Darwaza was the northern gateway of Shergarh, the 16th-century city established by Sher Shah Suri. It stood outside the walls of the later Mughal city of Shahjahanabad.

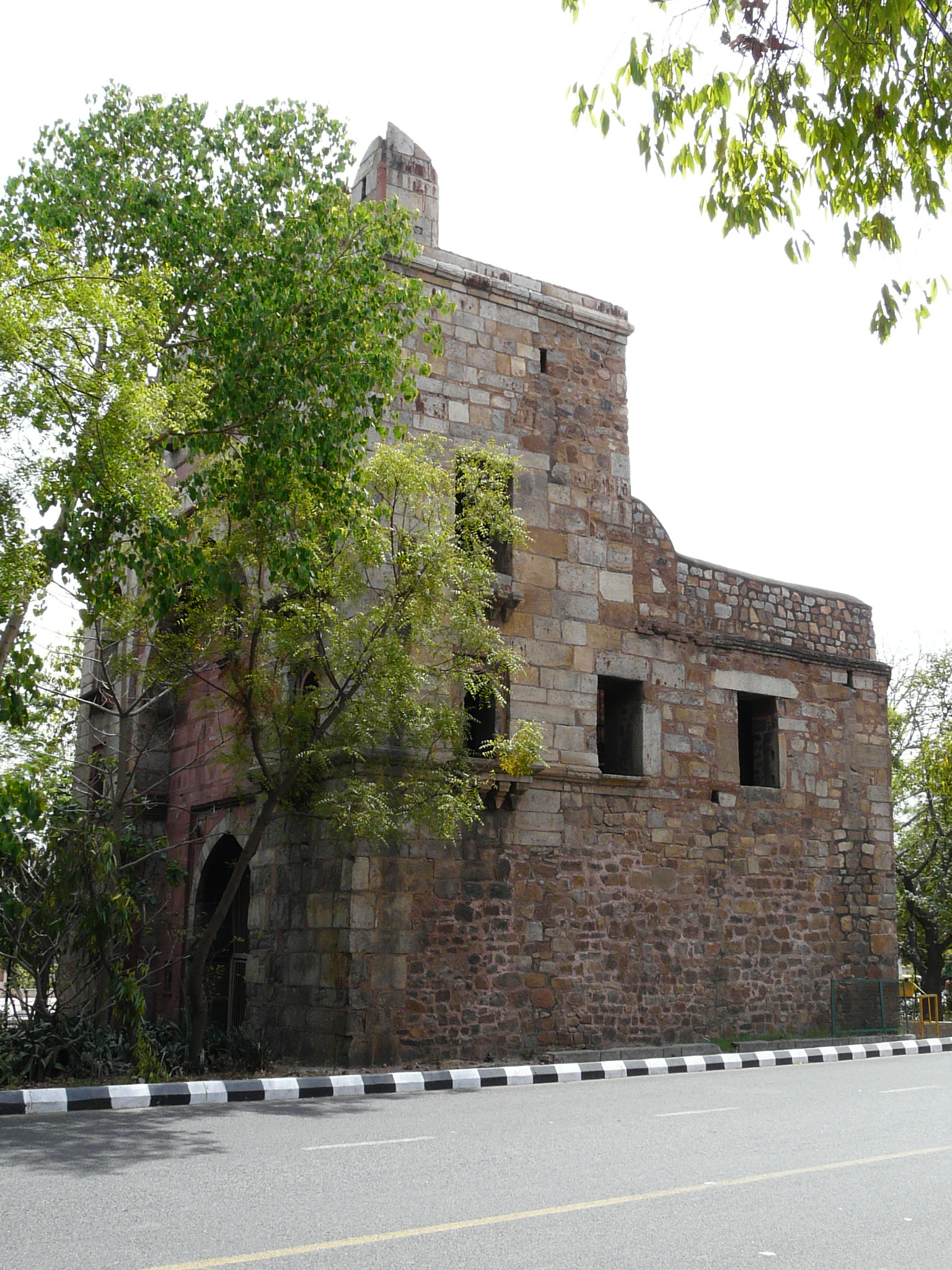
Khuni Darwaza or Bloody Gate

Kabuli Gate or Khooni Darwaza (Coordinates: 28.635974N 77.241042E), literally translated means "Bloody Gate", a "morbid sounding name". It is a double–storied structure. Its construction is credited to Sher Shah Suri's reign from 1540 to 1545 (though the fort walls of the Suri period have not been seen to extend to this gate). It was built largely with grey stone but red stones were also used in the frames of its windows. Though not within the walls of the Shahajahan's fort, it is located on the Mathura road opposite to the Ferozshah Kotla near Maulana Azad Medical College. During the Indian Rebellion of 1857, two sons and a grandson of the last Mughal emperor, Bahadur Shah Zafar, were shot and killed at Khooni Darwaza by British officer William Hodson in September 1857.

== Shahjahanabad ==
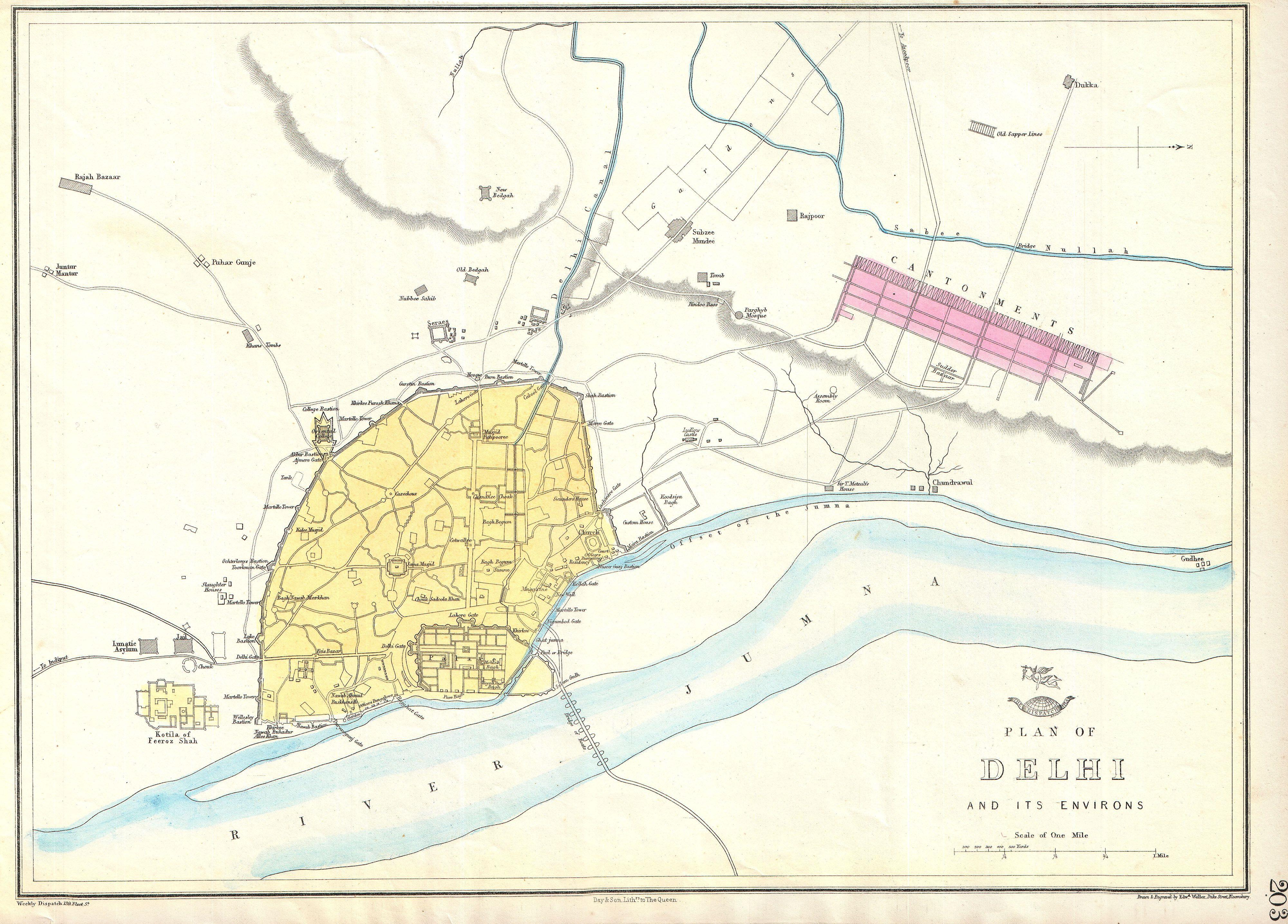
Shahjahanabad (Old Delhi) in 1863, showing all the gates to walled city.

Shahjahanabad, the seventh city of Delhi, was founded by the Mughal emperor Shah Jahan in 1639 and developed as his new imperial capital over the following decade. The walled city had 14 main gates and 16 smaller openings known as khirkis. A number of bastions built of stone were added by the British, in addition to repairing the earlier fort, to make the fort more secure. The gates were designed and built for the people to have access and the royal procession to enter or exit when going out in diverse directions. Out of the 14 gates, four gates have survived, namely, the Kashmiri Gate on the north, the Ajmeri Gate on the south-west, the Delhi Gate on the south-east, Turkman Gate on the south, all of which express vividly the splendor of the city. All the gates are located within a radius of 5–6 km (3.1–3.7 mi) in the present day Old Delhi. The Lahori Gate stood on the western side of Shahjahanabad, facing towards Lahore. The gateway and adjoining walls were demolished in 1888 to improve access between the walled city and Sadar Bazaar. The former gateway's location remains known as Lahori Gate. The gates have a square plan with high arched openings, except for low height of the Nigambodh gate, and two openings—one for entry and another for exit—of the Kashmiri gate. The names of all the gates which existed during Shahjahan's time are the Dilli Darwaza (also known as Delhi Gate), Kabuli Darwaza, Raj Ghat Darwaza, Khizri Darwaza, Nigambodh Darwaza, Kela Ke Ghat ka Darwaza, Lal Darwaza, Kashmiri Darwaza, Badar Darwaza, Patthar Khati Darwaza, Lahori Darwaza, Ajmeri Darwaza, Turkuman Darwaza and Mori Darwaza.

The names of the wicket gates or windows (now none exist) through which people entered and exited from the old fort city were:

- Zeenatul Masajid Khirkee
- Nawab Ahmad Bakhsh ki Khirkee
- Nawab Ghaziuddin ki Khirkee
- Musamman Burj ki Khirkee
- Muslim Garh ki Khirkee
- Naseer Ganj ki Khirkee
- Nai Khirkee
- Shah Ganj Khirkee
- Ajmeri Darwaza ki Khirkee
- Sayyad Bhole ki Khirkee
- Buland Bagh ki Khirkee
- Farash Khana ki Khirkee
- Ameer Khan ki Khirkee
- Khalil Khan ki Khirkee
- Bahadur Ali Khan ki Khirkee
- Nigambodh ki Khirkee.

=== Kashmiri gate ===
Kashmiri Gate in Shahajahanabad, Delhi

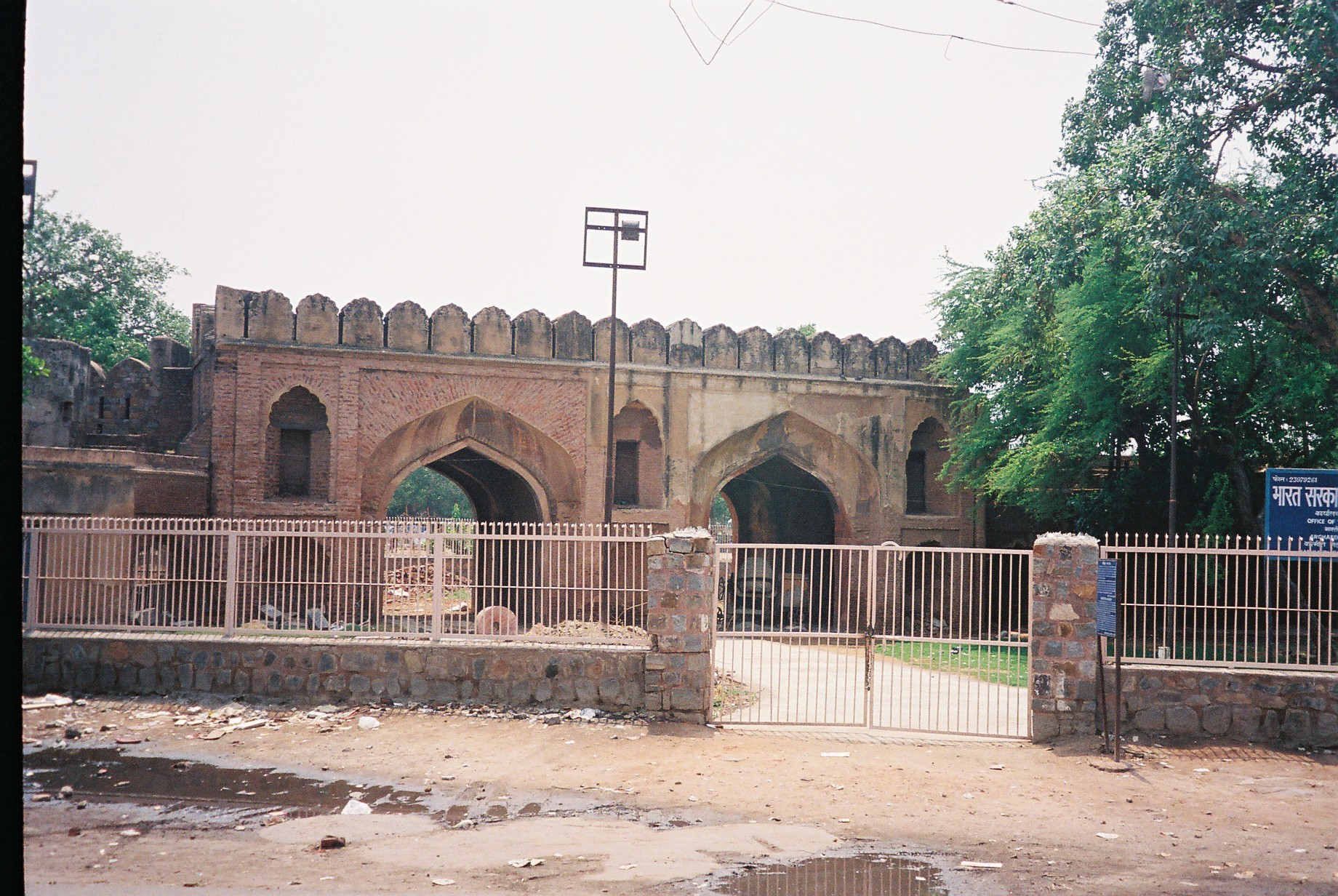
Kashmiri Gate preserved as a Heritage monument

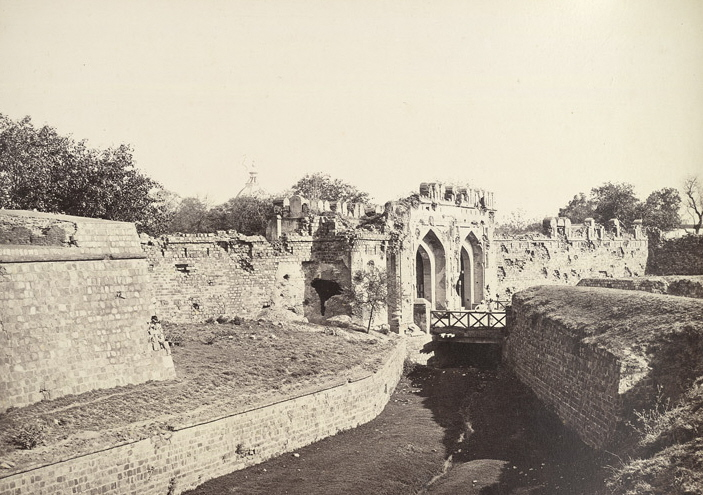
Mortar damage to Kashmiri Gate, Delhi, 1858

Kashmiri Gate is the northern entrance to Shahjahanabad, the historic walled city of Delhi. It takes its name from the road that led towards Kashmir. The present gateway was built by British military engineer Major Robert Smith in 1835 and has two arched openings. The gate stands near the Maharana Pratap Inter State Bus Terminus. It is now preserved as monument on the road to the Old Secretariat and the Delhi University. It was named as Kashmiri Gate since it was used by the emperors to go through on their visits to Kashmir and North India. It was also the historic venue of the intense fighting which took place in 1857, between British forces and Indian rebels. The fortifications were used to fire cannons at the British forces encamped at Ludlow Castle. The rebels gathered at a place close to the St. James Church to discuss war strategy. British forces fought fiercely at this gate and re-captured the city from the rebels. During the war, the gate was badly damaged by British cannon fire to get control over Delhi. Subsequently, area surrounding the Kashmiri Gate became the commercial hub of Delhi, when the Civil Lines were developed by the British.

=== Delhi Gate, of the Walled City of Shahjahanabad ===
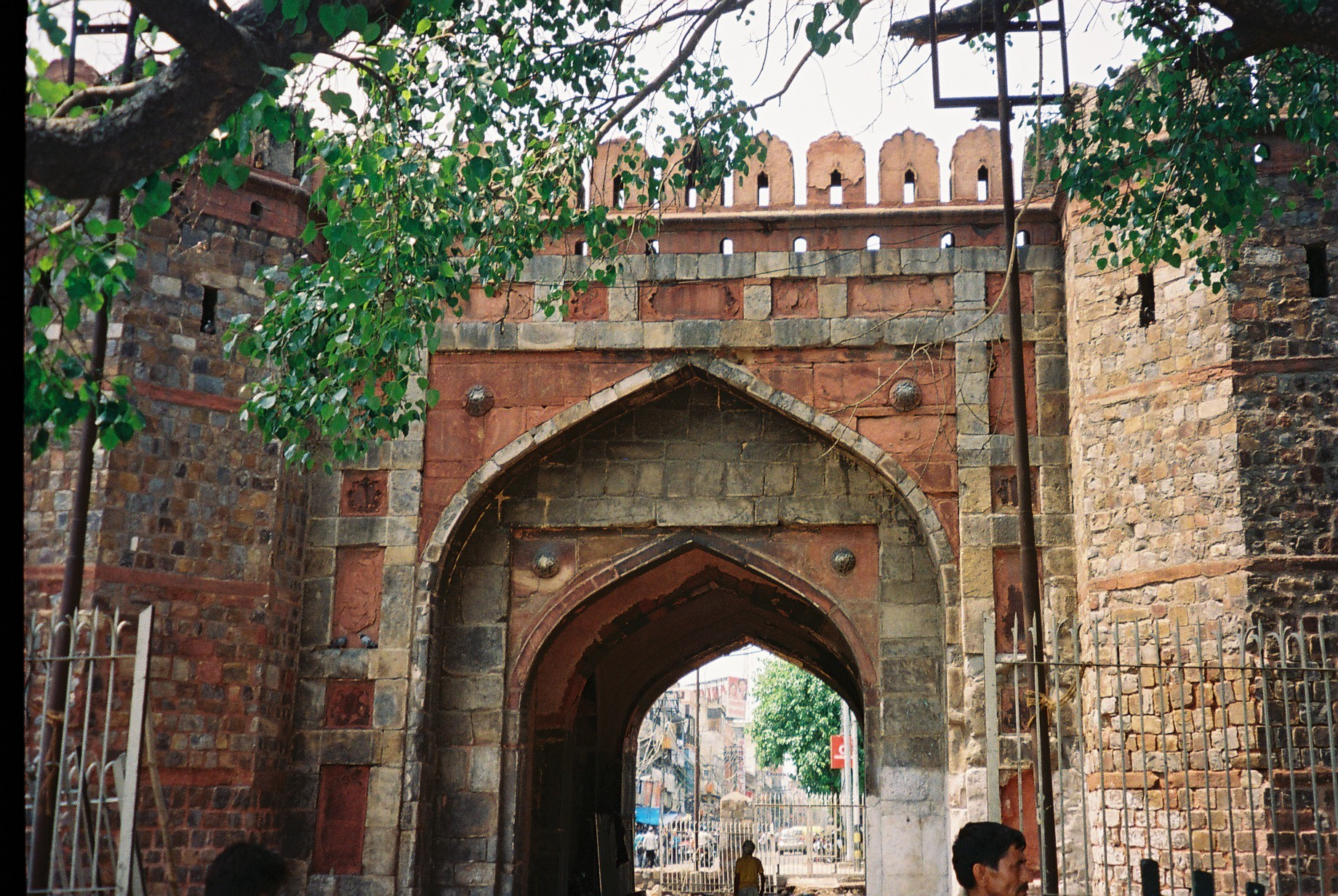

The Delhi Gate (Coordinates 28.641196N 77.240511E) is the southern gate in the historic walled city of (Old) Delhi, or Shahjahanabad. The gate links the New Delhi city with the old walled city of Delhi. It stands in the middle of the road, at the end of Netaji Subhash Chandra Road (or Netaji Subhash Marg), at the edge of the Daryaganj. There is another Delhi Gate of Delhi, which is also situated in Najafgarh.

=== Ajmeri Gate ===
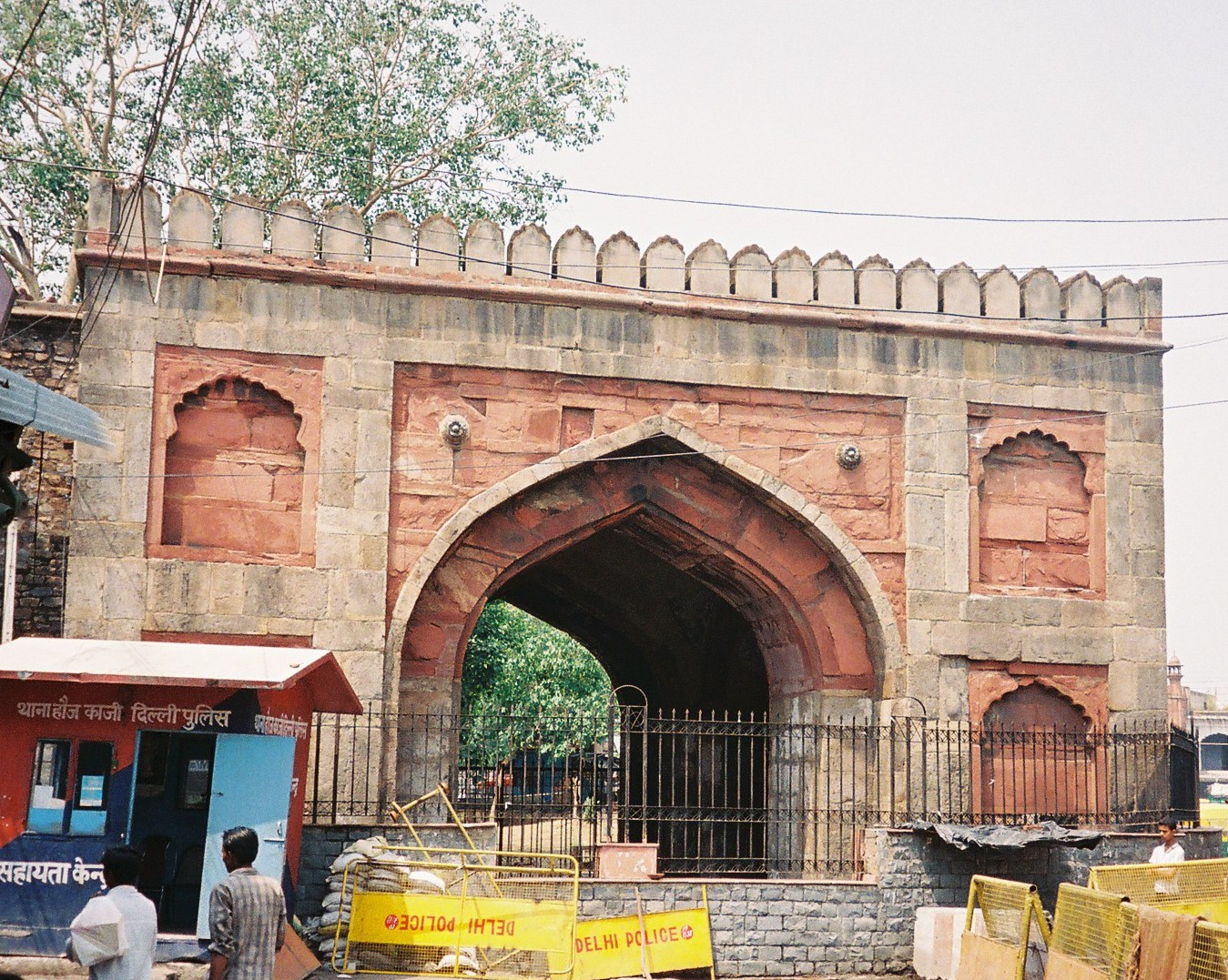
Ajmeri Gate

Ajmeri Gate, built in 1644, to the south–west of Shahjahanabad with a square plan, has high arched openings. It was one of the battlefields of the Sepoy Mutiny or the first war of Indian independence in 1857. The road, through this gate, leads to the city of Ajmer in Rajasthan, and hence its name. A lovely park surrounds the gate. The Madrasa Ghaziuddin Khan, near Ajmeri Gate, was established in the late 17th century by Ghaziuddin Khan, father of Asaf Jah I, the first Nizam of Hyderabad. Its founding is commonly dated to 1692. The complex includes the founder's tomb and a mosque. It later housed Delhi College and the Anglo Arabic Senior Secondary School.

=== Turkman Gate ===
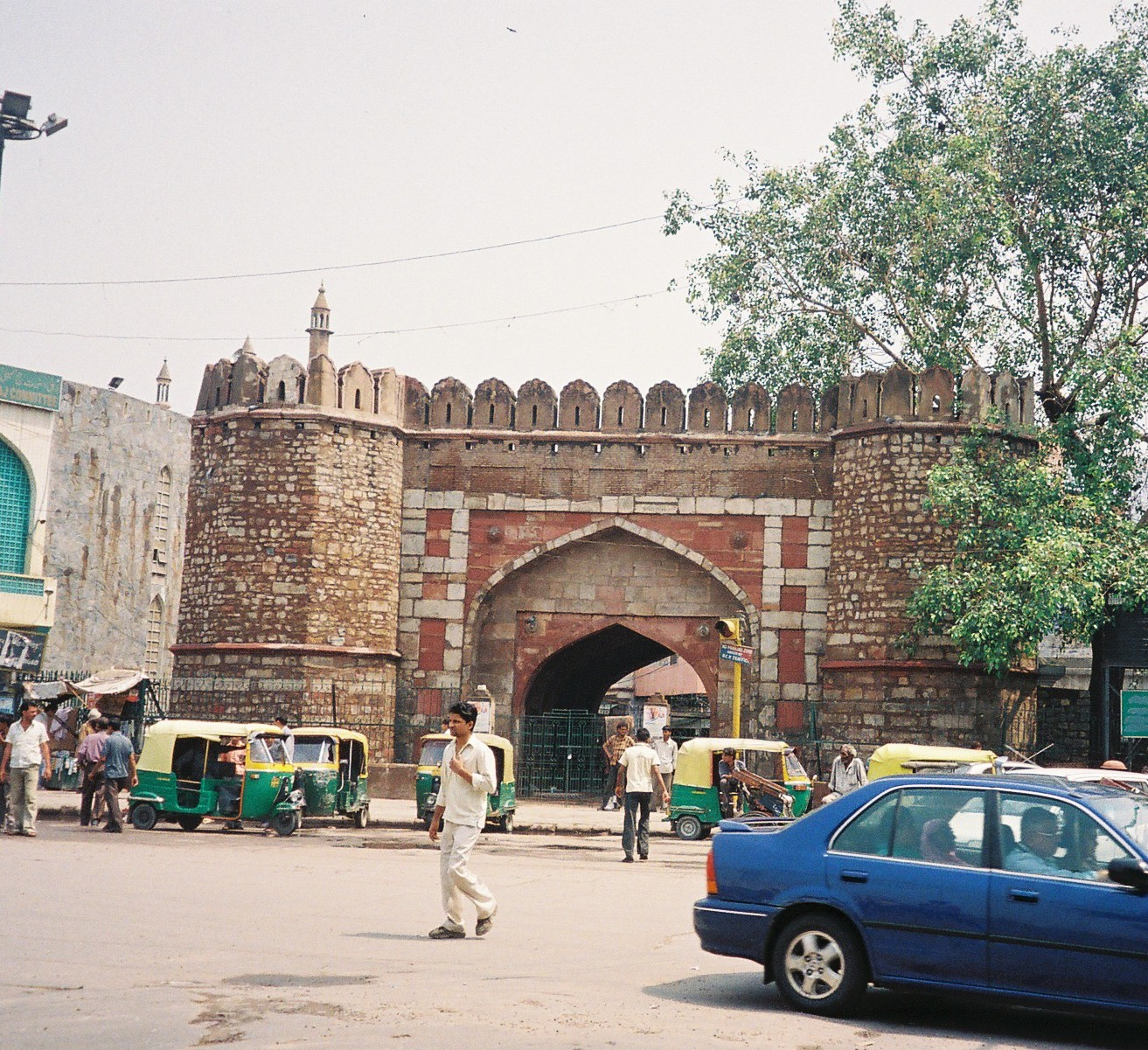
Turkman gate

Turkman Gate, located to the southern edge of Shahajahanabad (Coordinates: 28.642231N 77.232591E), is named after the Sufi Saint Shah Turkman Bayabani. His tomb dated to 1240, before building of Shahjahanabad, is located to the east of the gate. It is approached from the Jawahar Lal Nehru Road, the old Circular Road, in the vicinity of the Ramlila grounds. It has a square plan with high arched openings. The tomb of Razia Sultan and Kali Masjid or Kalan Masjid are located in close proximity of the gate. During the Emergency in April 1976, the area surrounding Turkman Gate became the site of a government-led demolition campaign targeting residential buildings and other structures. Local residents protested the demolitions, and on 19 April, police opened fire on demonstrators, killing several people. The historic gateway itself survived. For further details, see Turkman gate demolition and rioting.

=== Lahori Gate, of the Walled City of Shahjahanabad ===
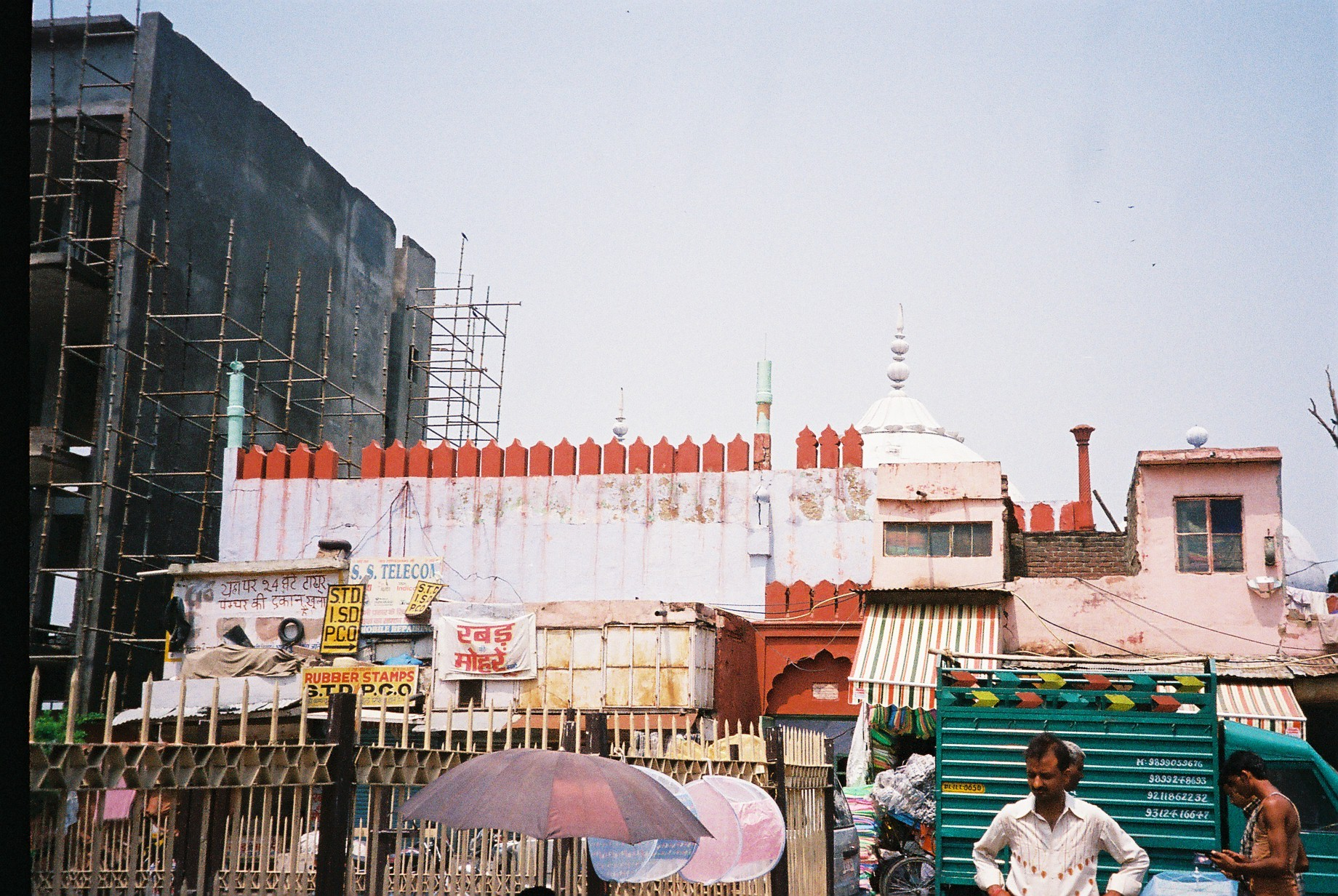
Remnant of old Lahori Gate at Lahori Bazar crossing

The Lahori Gate of the walled city of Old Delhi (Coordinates: 28.657110N 77.218831E) is now only a market location with small remnants at one end, which faced the direction of the city of Lahore and which used to lead east along the Chandni Chowk to the Lahori Gate of the Red Fort. Inside the Lahori gate is the grain market. Outside the gate stands a mosque built by Sirhindi Begum, wife of Shah Jahan, whom he married after the death of Arjumand Banu Begum, Mumtaz Mahal. This Lahori Gate was also one of the last points captured during the siege of 1857.

=== Lahori Gate, of the Red Fort ===
The Lahori Gate (Coordinates: 28.655879N 77.238666E) is the main gate to the Red Fort named after its orientation towards Lahore, Pakistan.

=== Delhi Gate, of the Red Fort ===
Delhi Gate on the southern side of the Red Fort

The Delhi Gate stands on the southern wall of the Red Fort and is one of its two principal gateways. The other, the Lahori Gate, served as the fort's main entrance. Two stone elephants, commissioned in 1903 by Lord Curzon to replace earlier sculptures, stand outside the Delhi Gate.

=== Mori Gate ===
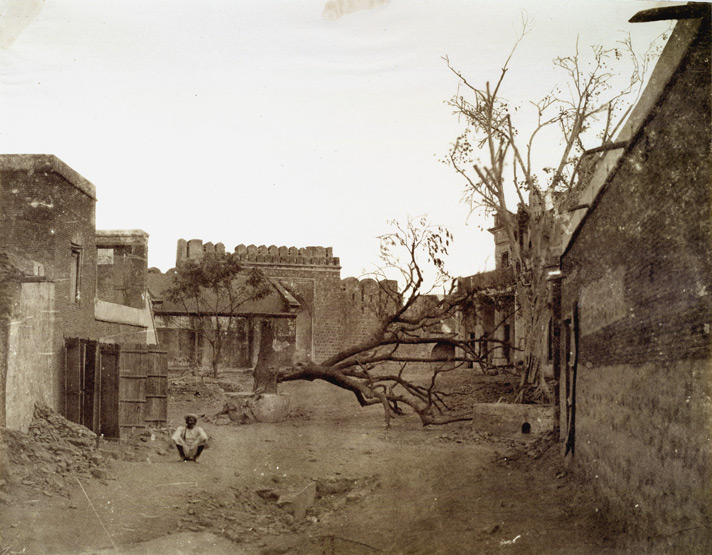
Mori Gate in 1858, photographed by John Murray.

Mori Gate was a northern gateway of Shahjahanabad, situated west of Kashmiri Gate, near the present-day intersection of Nicholson Road and Hamilton Road. It was demolished following the Indian Rebellion of 1857 as access to the walled city was expanded. Although the gateway no longer stands, portions of the surrounding fortification wall survive, and its name is preserved in nearby landmarks, including Mori Gate Road and Mori Gate Chowk.

=== Kabuli Gate ===
Kabuli Gate was situated on the northwestern side of Shahjahanabad, between Mori Gate and Lahori Gate. It was demolished in 1873, along with Mori Gate, to accommodate increased traffic and commercial activity associated with Delhi Junction railway station. The former gateway stood near the present-day intersection of Naya Bazar Road and Shyama Prasad Mukherjee Marg. No visible remains of the structure survive, and the surrounding locality no longer retains its name.

=== Nigambodh Gate ===
It was built on the north eastern side of the Shahjahanabad. It is located on the Ring Road near the Yamuna Bazaar. It derives its name from the Nigambodh Ghat, which is a funeral ground here. The etymology of Nigambodh is derived from Sanskrit words 'Nigam' which means the "Ved" and 'bodh' means "knowledge", meaning realization of knowledge. According to a folk legend, Lord Brahma (the creator) took a bath in the Yamuna River at this ghat to recover his lost memory, and by this act Brahma not only got back his memory but also remembered the place he had kept his sacred books. In the past, the gate was closer to the ghat and nearer to the Salimgarh Fort. The gate no longer exists as when the Yamuna river changed its course the gate disappeared and fell out of maintenance.

=== Bahadur Shahi Gate ===
Bahadur Shah Gate and Salimgarh Fort Gate

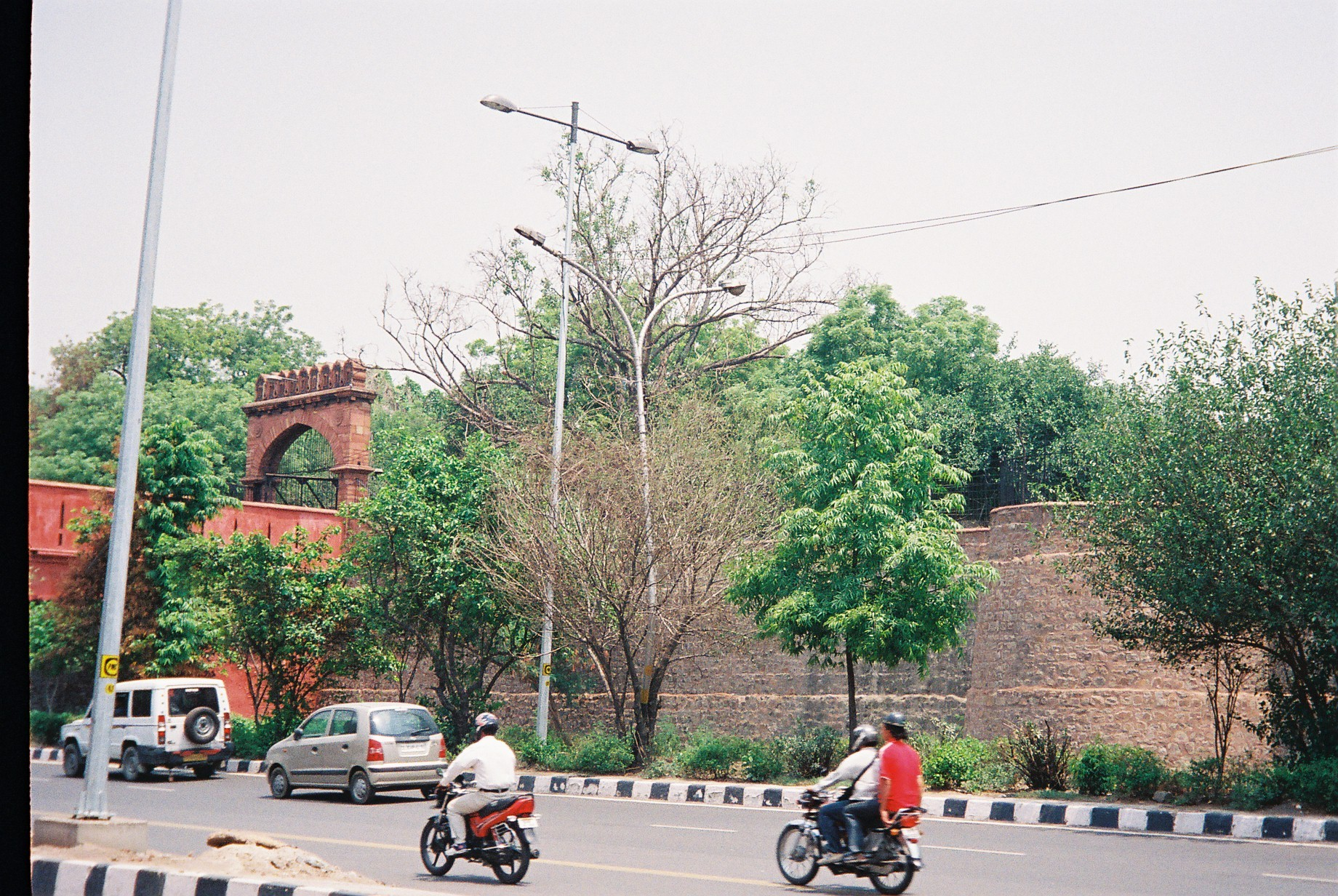
Bahadurshah gate linking Red Fort and Salimgarh Fort through the arched bridge

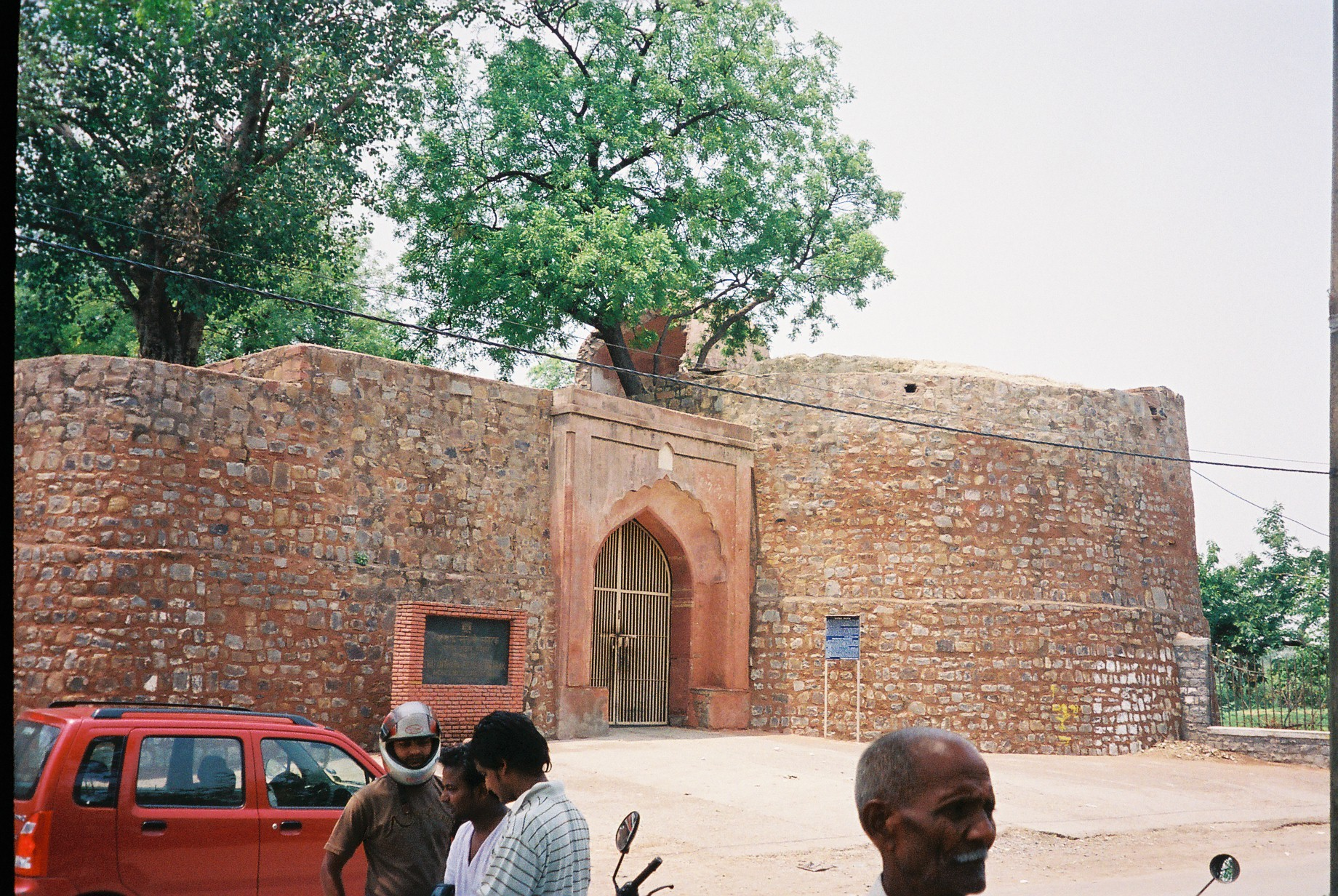
Entry Gate to Salimgarh Fort (renamed as Swatantrata Senani Smarak)

Salimgarh Fort, which is now part of the Red fort complex, was constructed on an island of the Yamuna River in 1546. But a gate called the Bahadur Shahi Gate for entry into the Fort from the northern side was constructed only in 1854–55 by Bahadur Shah Zafar, the last Mughal ruler of India. The gate was built in brick masonry with moderate use of red sandstone. The fort was used during the Uprising in 1857 and also as a prison, which housed Zebunnisa, daughter of Aurangzeb; the British imprisoned the freedom fighters of Indian National Army. The layout of the Red Fort was organized to retain and integrate this site with the Salimgarh Fort through the Bahadur Shah Gate.

== Gallery ==
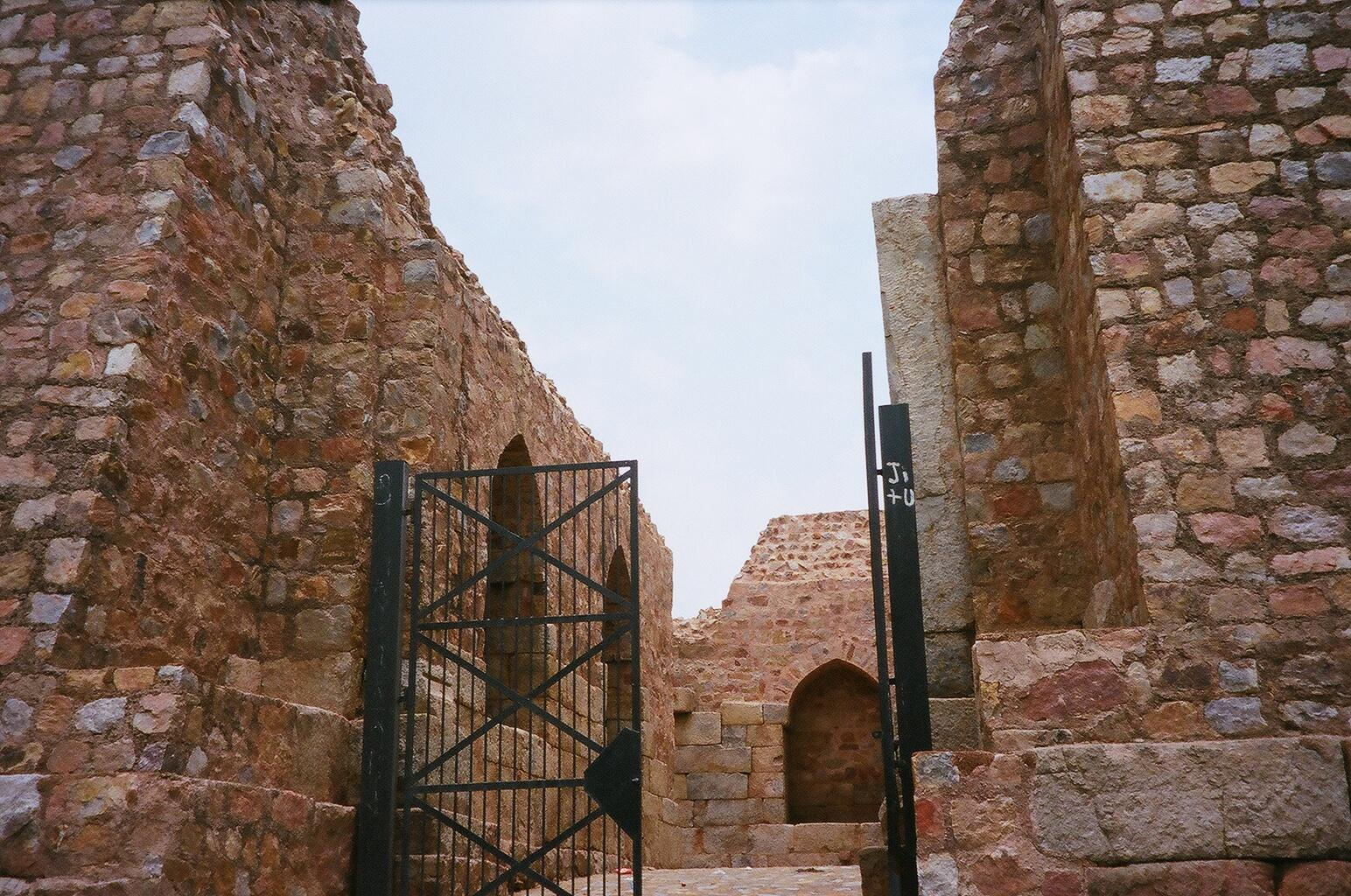
South gate entry to Tughlaqabad Fort

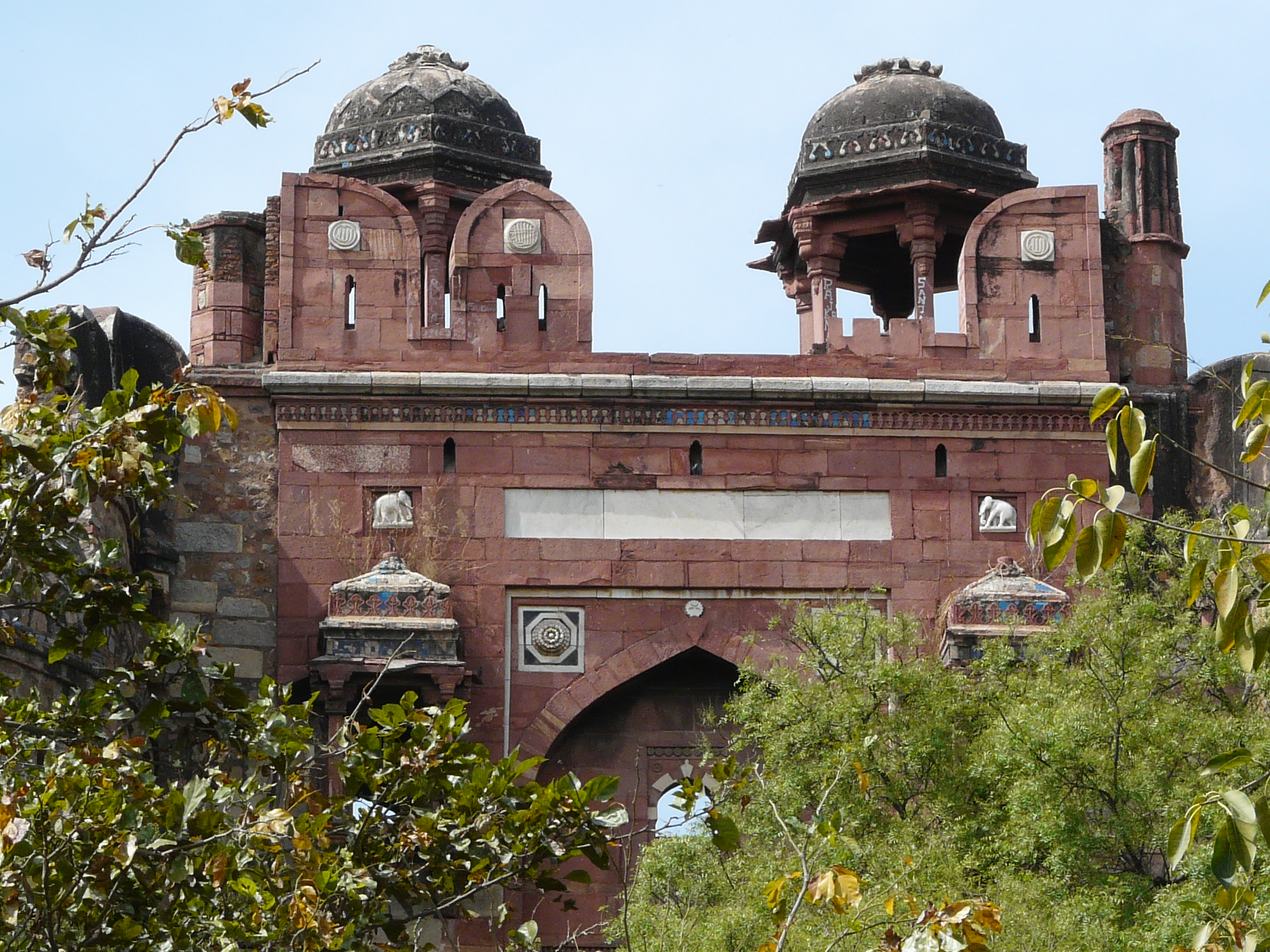
South Gate Purana Qila

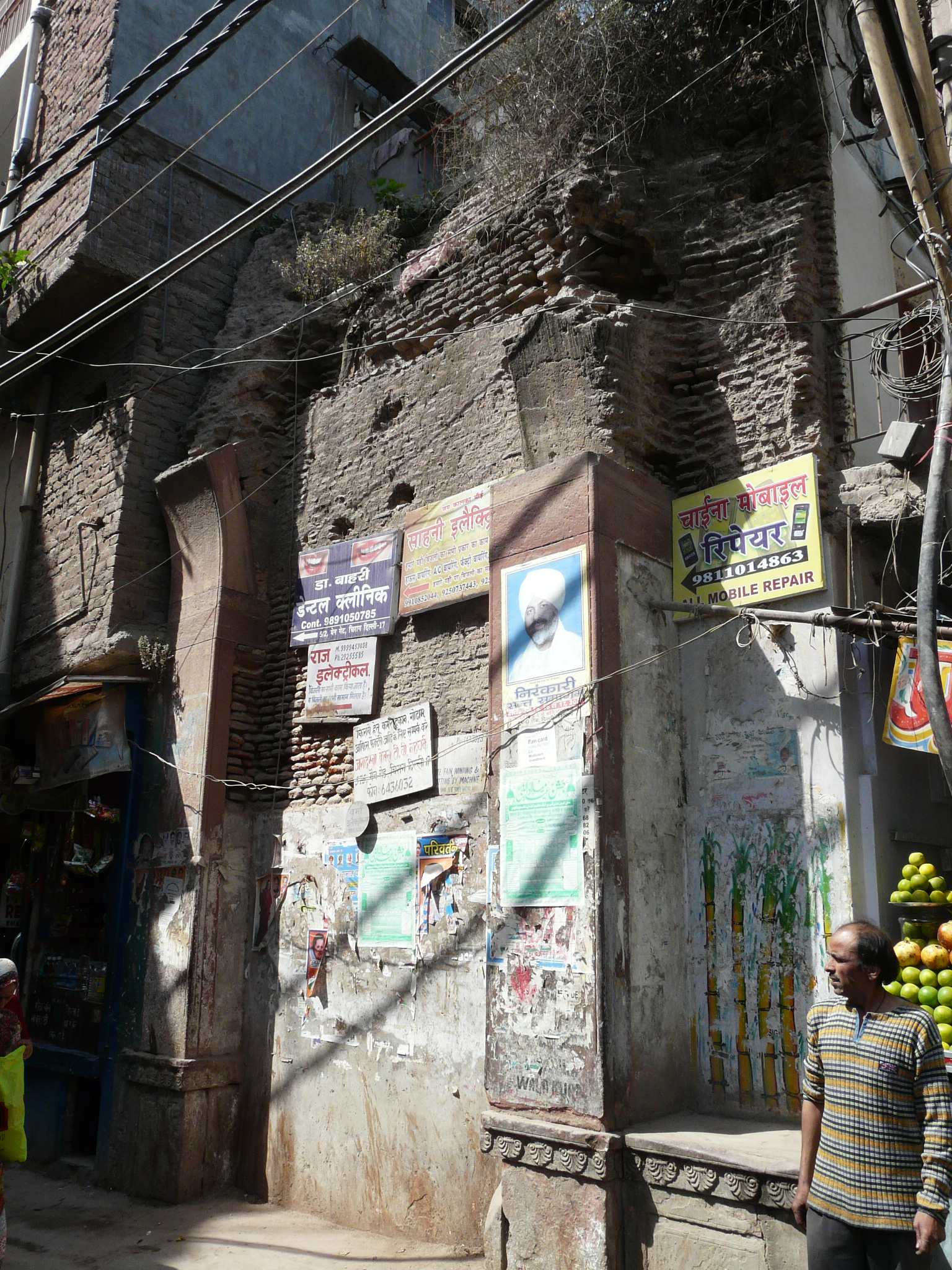
North gate Purana Qila

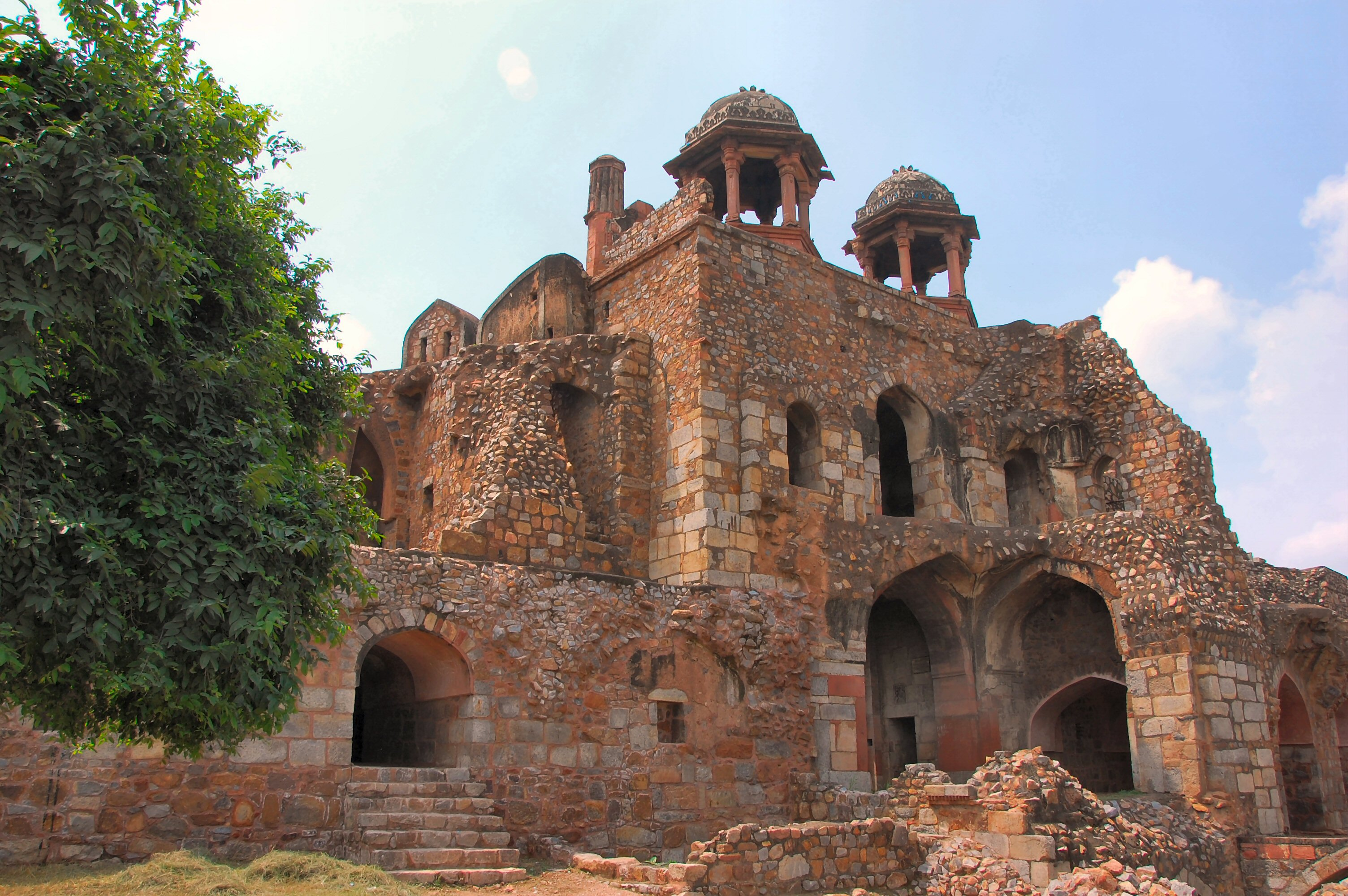
Purana Qila

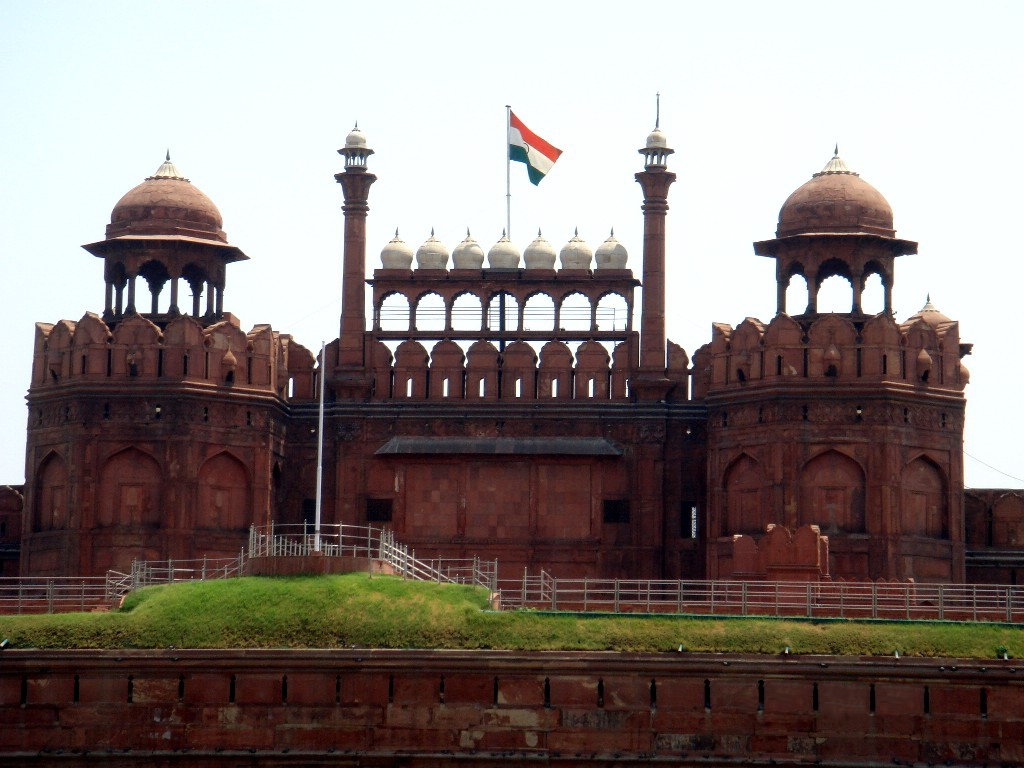
Red Fort entry gate

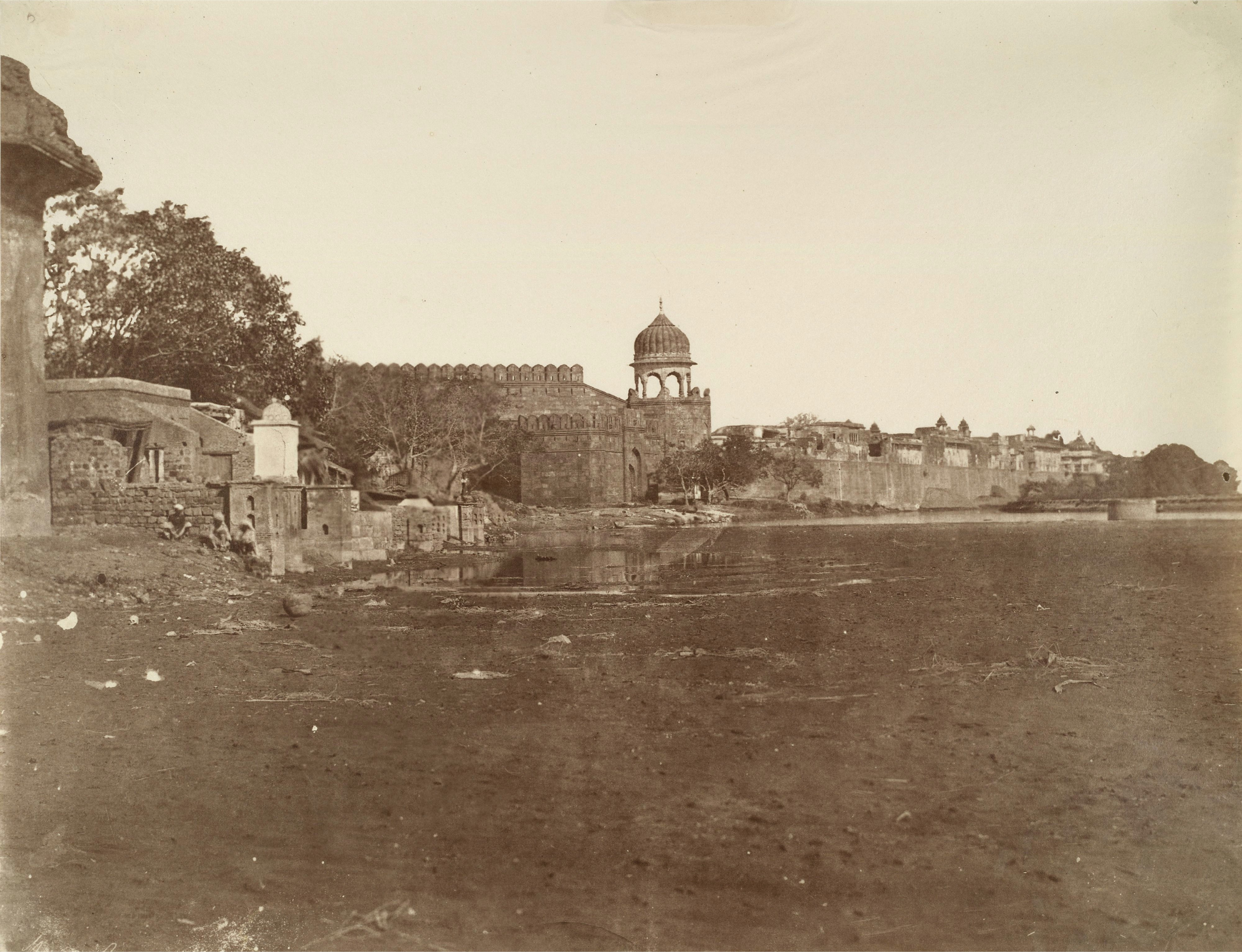
Water Gate of Red Fort

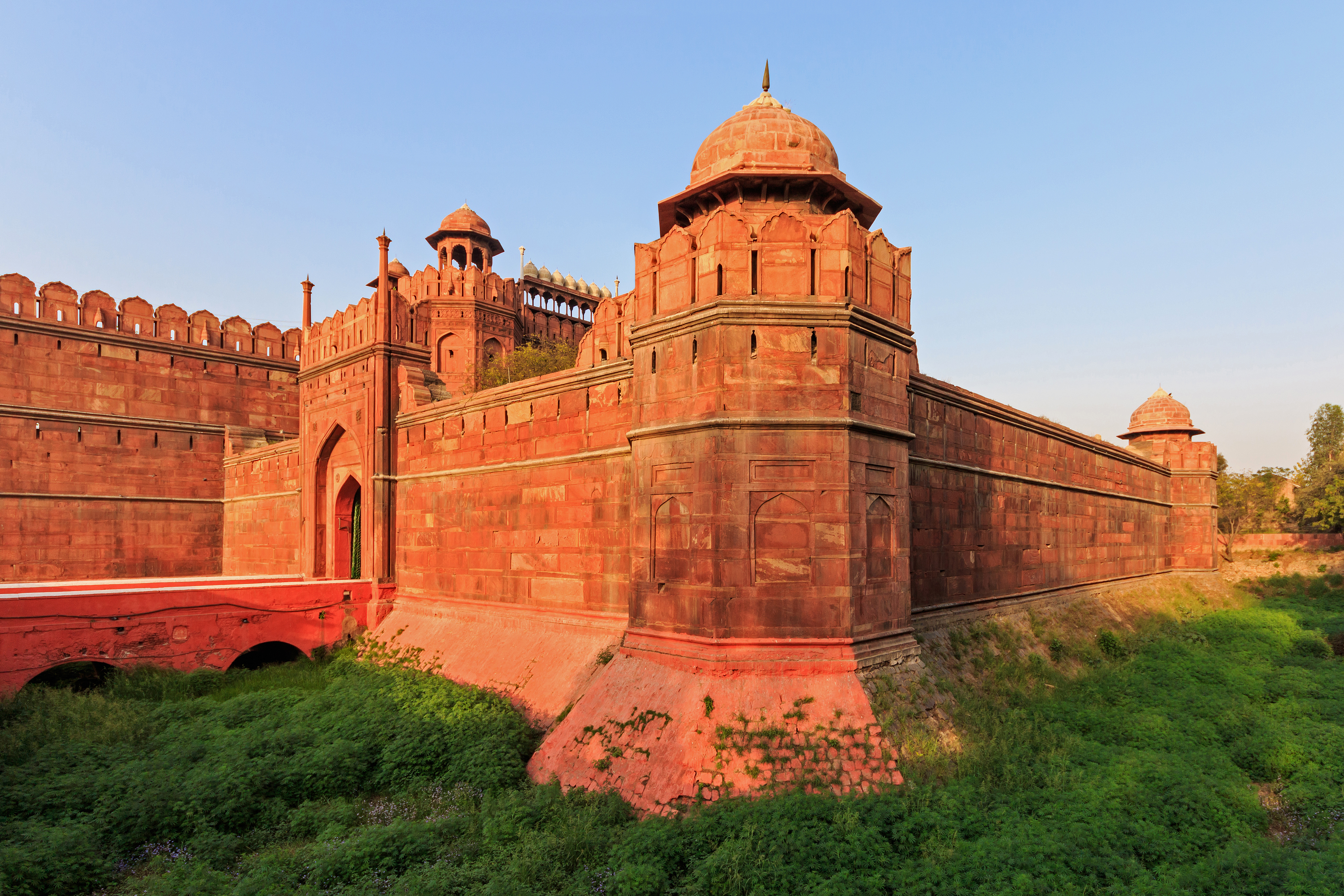
Delhi Gate of Red Fort

== See also ==
- Gates in India
- History of Delhi
- Gates in Aurangabad
