= Akbari =

Akbari (Arabic: أكبري; Persian: اکبرى) may refer to:

== Places ==
- Akbari, Fars
- Akbari, Bavanat, Fars Province
- Akbari, Hormozgan

== Other uses ==
- Akbari (surname)
- Akbari Architecture, a style of Indo-Islamic architecture
- Akbari Fort & Museum, a museum In Ajmer, Rajasthan, India

== See also ==
- Akbar (disambiguation)
- Akhbari
- Akbarism, a branch of Sufi metaphysics based on the teachings of Ibn Arabi, who was known as Shaykh al-Akbar
