= Akbar (disambiguation) =

Akbar (1542–1605) was the third Mughal Emperor.

Akbar or Ackbar may also refer to:

- Akbar (name)
- HMS Akbar, a number of ships of the Royal Navy
- USS Akbar (SP-599), a U.S. Navy patrol boat during World War I
- Akbar, Basilan, a municipality in the Philippines
- Akbar (film) or Aegan, a 2008 film by Raju Sundaram
- Akbar, 1967 Indian documentary film about the emperor by Shanti S. Varma, won a National Film Award
- Akbar the Great, Indian television series about the emperor directed by Akbar Khan, aired on DD National

== See also ==
- Allahu Akbar (disambiguation)
- Akbari (disambiguation), an Iranian surname
- Akbarian
- Akhbar (disambiguation), a different word, meaning news
- Shahenshah Akbar, a 1943 Indian film about the emperor
- Admiral Ackbar, a character from the Star Wars saga
