= Akbari (surname) =

Akbari (Persian: اکبری) is an Iranian/Persian surname. Notable people with the surname include:

- Alireza Akbari (1961–2023), Iranian politician and dual Iranian-British citizen
- Fatema Akbari (born 1974), Afghan political figure
- Hashem Akbari (born 1949), Iranian-American professor at Concordia University
- Jalal Akbari (born 1983), Iranian footballer
- Mania Akbari (born 1974), Iranian film director
- Mohammad Hossein Akbari (born 1950), Iranian tennis player
- Mohammad Reza Akbari (born 1986), Iranian basketball player
- Rahmat Akbari (born 2000), Australian association football player
- Raumesh Akbari (born 1984), Tennessee House of Representatives District 91
- Suzanne Conklin Akbari, Historian at the Institute for Advanced Study
- Taghi Akbari (born 1945), Iranian tennis player
- Yadollah Akbari (born 1974), Iranian footballer
