= Shah Jahan period architecture =

Mughal architectural period, 1628–1658

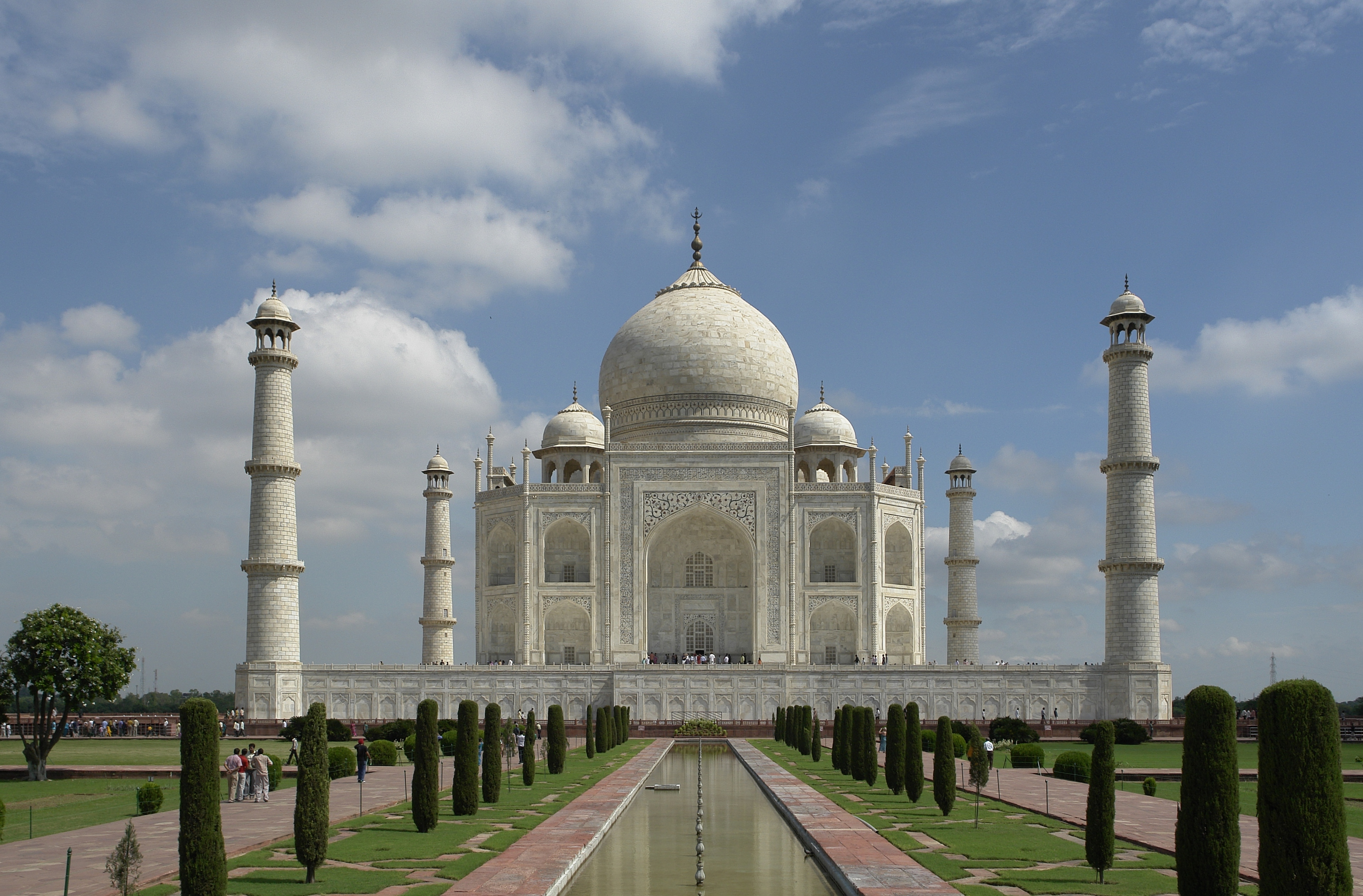
The Taj Mahal in Agra

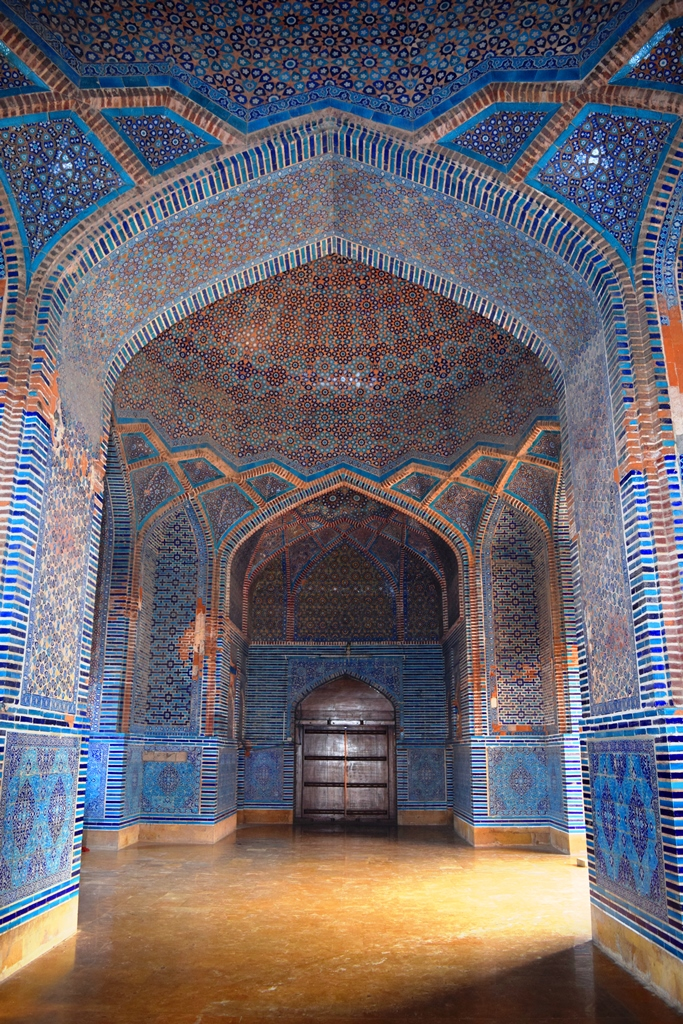
Shah Jahan Mosque, Thatta, Pakistan

Shah Jahan period architecture is an architectural period of Mughal architecture. It is associated with Shah Jahan's thirty-year reign over the Mughal Empire from 1628 to 1658. The most notable structures of this period include the Taj Mahal in Agra and the Red Fort in Old Delhi. Shah Jahan period architecture is distinguished by the extensive use of symmetry, the embellishing of structures through features such as the Shahjahani column and the use of red sandstone and white marble as essential building materials. Shah Jahan is believed to have been heavily involved in the design and construction processes of the structures which had an immediate cultural impact seen through the involvement of social elites in architectural practices. Shah Jahan period architecture was influenced by previous Mughal emperors architectural works in addition to Persian architecture.

== Background ==
Shah Jahan reigned over the Mughal Empire from 1628 – following the death of Shah Jahan's father, Jahangir. His reign lasted 30 years to 1658, when Shah Jahan's son, Aurangzeb gained power and made a declaration as the new Mughal emperor. Shah Jahan showed an early interest in architecture and is affiliated with the construction of numerous gardens and buildings prior to his rule. These include; the Shalimar garden in Kashmir (northern region of India) in 1608 and a hunting resort in the Burhanpur region around 1613, where he showed interest in the organisation and planning of imperial buildings and cities.

It wasn't until the death of Shah Jahan's father and Shah Jahan's subsequent coronation that the true extent of Shah Jahan's architectural prowess was realised. There was the immediate construction of Jahangir's tomb in 1628, located in Lahore. Although the brief mentioning of this architectural project by Shah Jahan's chronicler means it is suspected Shah Jahan had limited influence over the project, the tomb does reflect some early features that were to become central to Shah Jahan period architecture. These features include the use of white marble and red sandstone as central materials in addition to bilateral symmetry, features that can be seen in the Taj Mahal, the most noteworthy structure of Shah Jahan period architecture. Throughout his reign, Shah Jahan is suspected to have built thirty-five palaces and gardens, with twenty-four still in existence. Due to the scale of construction, Shah Jahan period architecture is a valuable source for understanding the development of Islamic architecture throughout the 17th century.

=== Early Shah Jahan period architecture ===
More notable projects in the early part of Shah Jahan's reign include the Agra and Lahore forts. These were part of reconstruction projects which built upon previous Mughal constructions and architectural practices. These broader Mughal architectural practices involved the organising and placement of imperial buildings which overlooked rivers and artificial lakes. The imperial buildings were mostly constructed using white marble, whilst the public spaces, built away from water sources tended to use red sandstone. The reconstruction of the Lahore Fort took place over 17 years, beginning in 1628. Shah Jahan ordered the immediate construction of a Public Audience Hall known as a Chehil Sutun. This building was a 40-pillar structure which was often used as a space for royal advisors and members of the public to gather and show respect to the Shah. The reconstruction project of the Agra Fort is understood as an expression of the consolidation of Shah Jahan's power. The reconstruction saw the dismantling of structures built by previous Mughal Emperors, Akbar and Jahangir and the replacement of these structures with distinctive Shah Jahan period architecture features.

=== Late Shah Jahan period architecture ===
Late Shah Jahan period architecture is characterized by the consolidation of distinctive features; floral symbols, embellishing features in archways, and a vast increase in the scale of projects. This was seen in the construction of a new walled city – Shahjahanabad – which was to become the new capital of the Mughal Empire. Shahjahanabad became the Mughal capital during Shah Jahan's rule with construction beginning in 1639 after Shah Jahan expressed displeasure over the Agra and Lahore Forts. Shahjahanabad is a walled city now known for being where Delhi's Red Fort is located in Old Delhi. The location is significant as it was built in the same region as early Mughal capitals. Much of the city still stands today, and the notable buildings include the structures inside the Red Fort, the Jama Masjid, and all the religious structures like the Lal Mandir. It also included buildings from high-ranking officials which were not built by Shah Jahan but resembled the distinctive style of the official palace buildings. The construction of Shahjahanabad received much attention from Shah Jahan with his chronicler describing an active involvement in the designing process. This involvement and unity in the design highlight the influence and prominence of Shah Jahan period architecture in the Mughal Empire.

== Features of Shah Jahan period architecture ==
Shah Jahan period architecture saw the refining of many structural elements from previous Mughal periods. Ebba Koch described Shah Jahan period architecture as taking, “on a new aesthetic,” with the defining elements of this period being, “symmetry and uniformity of shapes.” This meant the architectural period saw increased uniformity of design in architectural elements such as columns and archways. This period of architecture also saw an increase in Islamic symbolism and heralded a return to orthodox approaches to design. The key features of Shah Jahan period architecture include; symmetry, the Shahjahan column, and the extensive embellishment of buildings through ornamental features.

=== Symmetry ===
Symmetry was a prominent feature in earlier Mughal periods, however, under Shah Jahan, it was to become a defining feature of his architectural style. The centrality of symmetry to Shah Jahan period architecture is expressed not only throughout the numerous structures but palace gardens. Symmetry was a key feature of earlier Mughal periods, however, Shah Jahan period architecture expanded on this to widely endorse bilateral symmetry. This means buildings could be broken down into two halves, and although this was previously seen in Jahangir architecture, it was not to the scale as in Shah Jahan's period, which saw it used in both “individual buildings and large complexes.” Symmetry was also used throughout many of the palace gardens. The function of the palace gardens varied, but Ebba Koch highlighted the symbolic power described by a contemporary poet, Amir Khusraw. The palace gardens were envisioned by Khusraw as indicating the contemporary prosperity of the Mughal Empire through being a paradise on earth. The symmetry of the gardens and buildings represents the harmony, unity, and balance between all parts of a garden or structure.

=== Shahjahani Column ===
Shah Jahan period architecture saw the consolidation of architectural forms. This was seen in the widespread use of what was to become known as the Shahjahani column. The column consisted of a “multi-faceted capital and a cusped-arch base,” and was combined with an ornamental “voluted bracket.” This style of column emerged in Akbar and Jahangir's reign, however, it was not used to the same extent as was in Shah Jahan's reign. The column was originally unique to distinguished imperial buildings, however, in the late period of Shah Jahan architecture, it became widely used in public spaces. The column was also developed with a multi-foil arch, an archway with leaf-shaped arches, which is a key feature in the Taj Mahal complex.

=== Ornamental Feature ===
Ornamental features were used to embellish and decorate buildings. As seen with other architectural features, this was a practice used in preceding Mughal periods, however, the scale and content of such features were increased throughout Shah Jahan's reign. Unique to Shah Jahan period architecture was the use of flowers and plants as a form of imagery. This was typically located on the lower parts of walls. The dominant images of flowers were also used in other ornamental features such as; paintings, carved marble works, or “inlays of hard (precious) stones.” Similar to the use of symmetry, ornamental features were initially reserved for imperial buildings and were later extended to public spaces.

== Notable buildings ==
=== Taj Mahal ===
The Taj Mahal is located outside of Agra and is the centre feature of a broader complex of buildings. The Taj is a mausoleum for Shah Jahan's favourite wife, Mumtaz Mahal. The broader complex includes the residential garden, the mosque, Mihman Khana (assembly hall), the wall towers, pool and garden wall pavilions. Construction began in 1632 following the death of Mumtaz Mahal and took eleven years to build. The extensive use of white marble in the mausoleum, the high-vaulted domes and its grandeur make it an iconic piece of global architecture. It has reached global significance both as a piece of architecture and as a symbol of love and dedication to Mumtaz Mahal.

== Significance and legacy of Shah Jahn period architecture ==
In itself, Mughal architecture has a profound legacy, and as Asher notes, “the symbolic content of Mughal architecture peaks under Shah Jahan.” This highlights the prominence of this period of architecture throughout not only India, but neighbouring Pakistan, where the Lahore temple is located. The contemporary sources, from historians, poets and chroniclers also suggest the unprecedented involvement of Shah Jahan in the architectural projects. This involvement had an immediate legacy, seen by the participation of people of high-status in later choosing to embellishing cities. Shah Jahan also made unprecedented financial contributions to the architectural development. The continued cultural legacy is highlighted by the prominence of structures built in the Shah Jahan period, both within Indian and global culture. No structure better represents the legacy of Shah Jahan period architecture than the Taj Mahal, which not only has significance in India but global significance. This was highlighted by its inclusion in the New Seven Wonders of the World. Further, the Taj Mahal receives up to 8 million visitors per year and continues to be a valuable source of tourism revenue throughout India. There is contention as to the validity of the lasting legacy of violence and cruelty linked to the construction of Shah Jahan's buildings. In particular, the repeated story that following the construction of the Taj Mahal, Shah Jahan cut off his workers’ hands so they could not build another structure has received much attention from Western and non-Western sources. In Fergus Nicoll's monograph Shah Jahan, he highlights that it is unlikely Shah Jahan ordered the cutting off of hands, however argued that building processes were riddled with cruelty. This leads Nicoll to characterise Shah Jahan's reign, not as the regularly touted golden era of the Mughal Empire, but one marred by cruelty. Other sources from non-Western scholars suggest the violence associated with the construction process, but the lasting legacy of Shah Jahan is overwhelmed by the depiction as a golden-era of Mughal architecture.

== See also ==
- Akbari architecture

== Sources ==
- Encyclopædia Britannica, 1988, volume 10, p. 687
- Asher, C. “Architecture of Mughal India”. In The New Cambridge History of India, (Cambridge: Cambridge University Press, 1992).
- Beg, Saleem. “Debunking an urban myth about Taj Mahal.” The Hindu, March 9, 2022. https://www.thehindu.com/opinion/op-ed/debunking-an-urban-myth-about-taj-mahal/article65205195.ece
- D’Souza, Roshni. “Shah Jahan's Reign: The Golden Era of Mughal Architecture”. Madras Courier, January 5, 2022. https://madrascourier.com/biography/shah-jahans-reign-the-golden-era-of-mughal-architecture/
- Koch, Ebba. Mughal architecture: an outline of its history and development (1526-1858) (Germany, Prestel-verlag. Munich 1991)
- Koch, Ebba. “The Taj Mahal: Architecture, Symbolism, and Urban Significance.” Muqarnas 22 (2005): 128–149.
- Mishra, K. Vandana. “Development of Architecture During the Mughal Period in India.” Jamshedpur 1, 32 (2019): 43-47
- Nicoll, Fergus. Shah Jahan. Penguin Books India, 2009.
- Richards, John F. The Mughal Empire. Vol. I. (Cambridge University Press, 2012).
