= Akbari architecture =

AKBARi Architecture

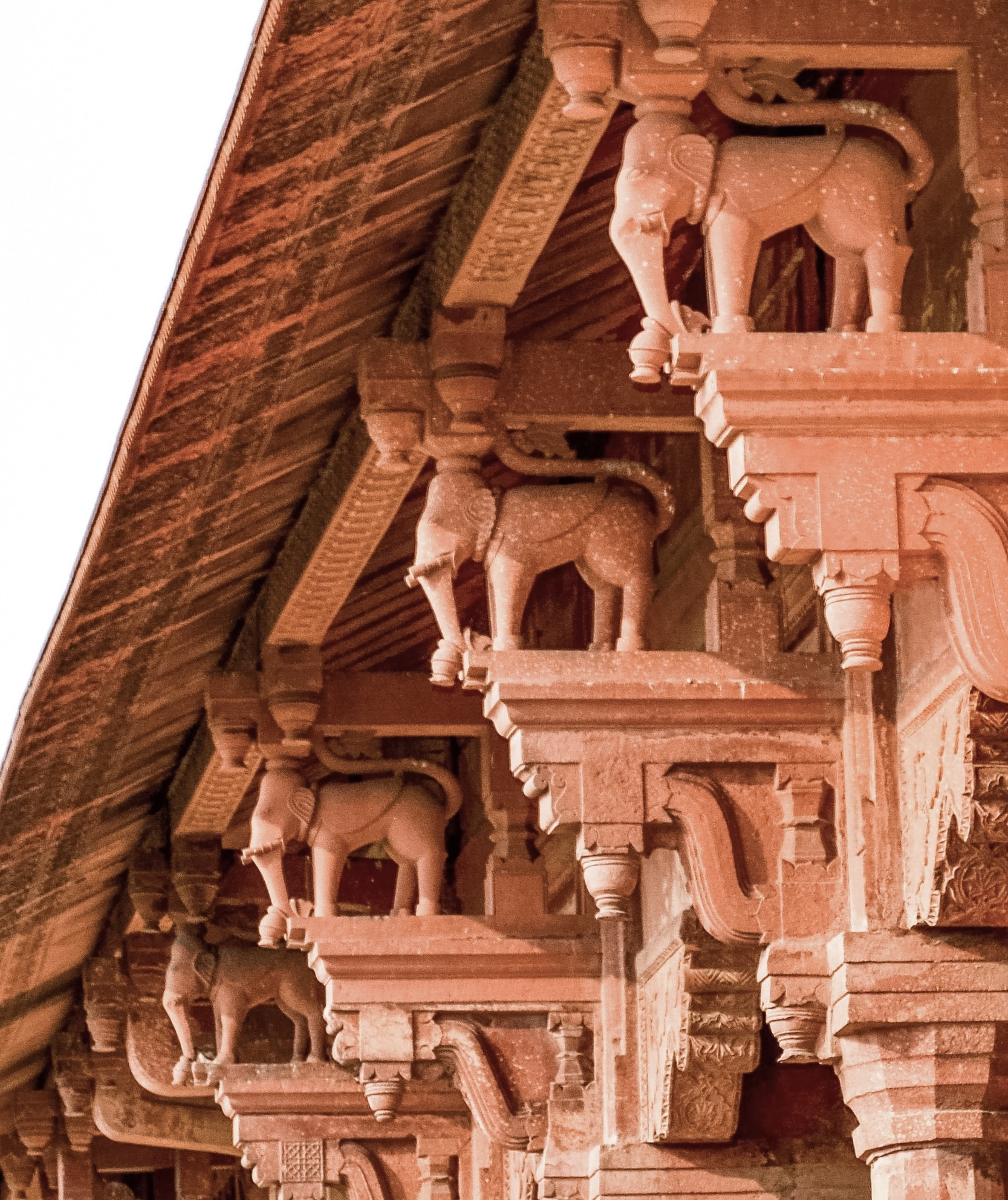
The use of elephant-shaped column brackets in buildings of the Lahore Fort reflects Hindu influences on Mughal Architecture during the reign of Akbar. Islam forbids representation of living figures.

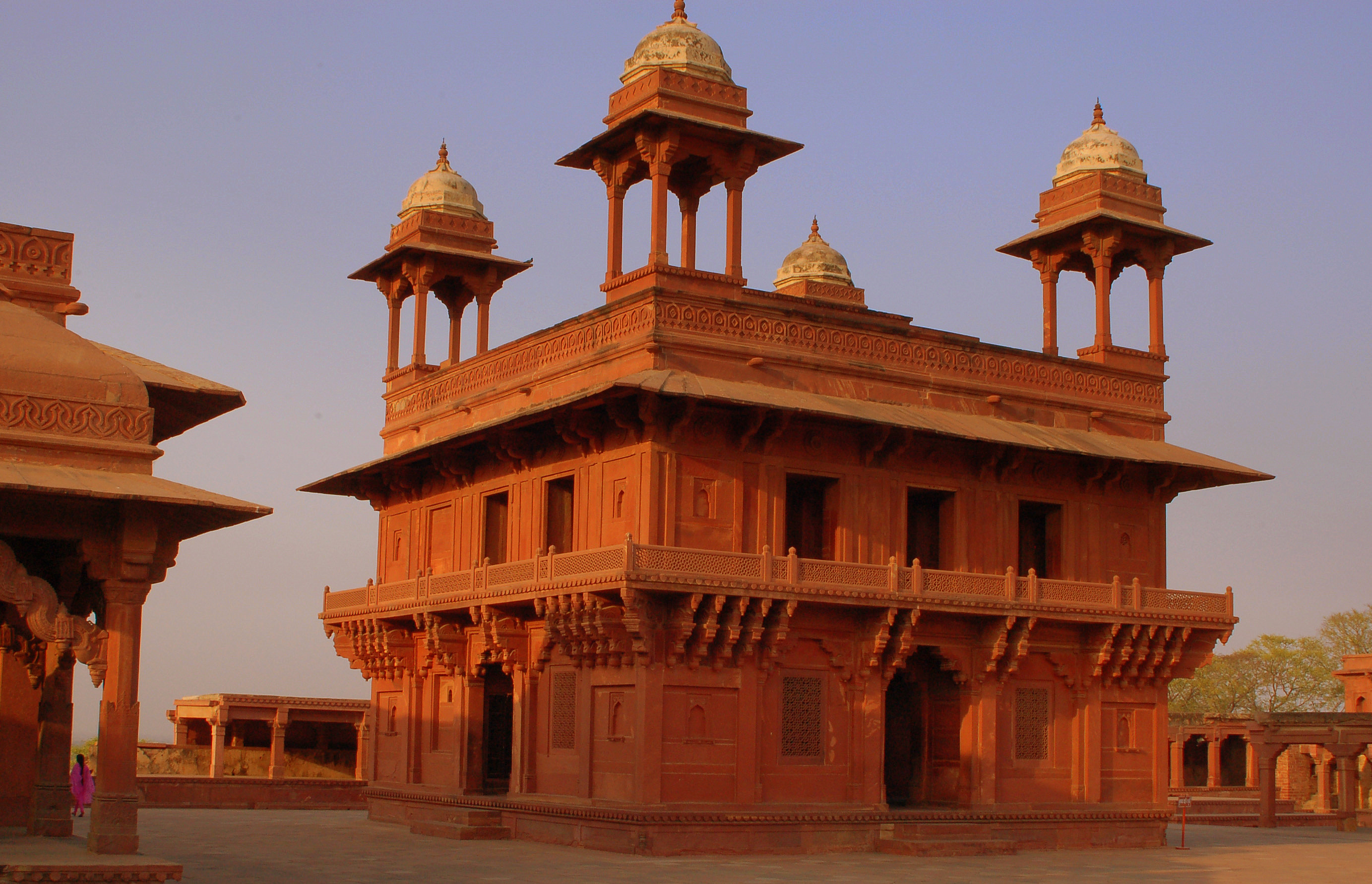
The "Akbar" style of architecture, an example of which is this building, the Naubat Khana in Fatehpur Sikri, Agra, India.

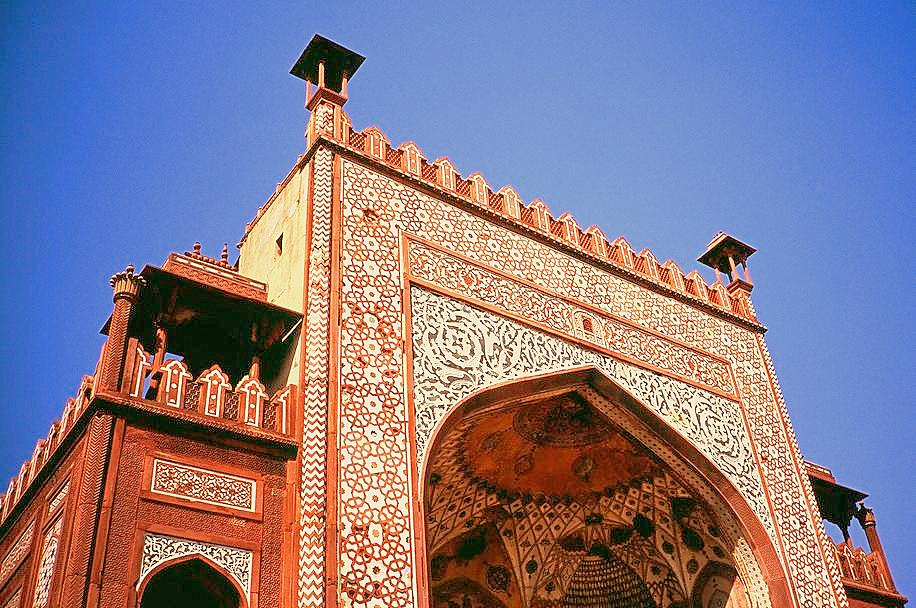
One of the gates of Akbar's Tomb at Sikandra, which shows the amalgam of Islamic fractal geometric patterns and central arch with the Indian style roof pavilions.

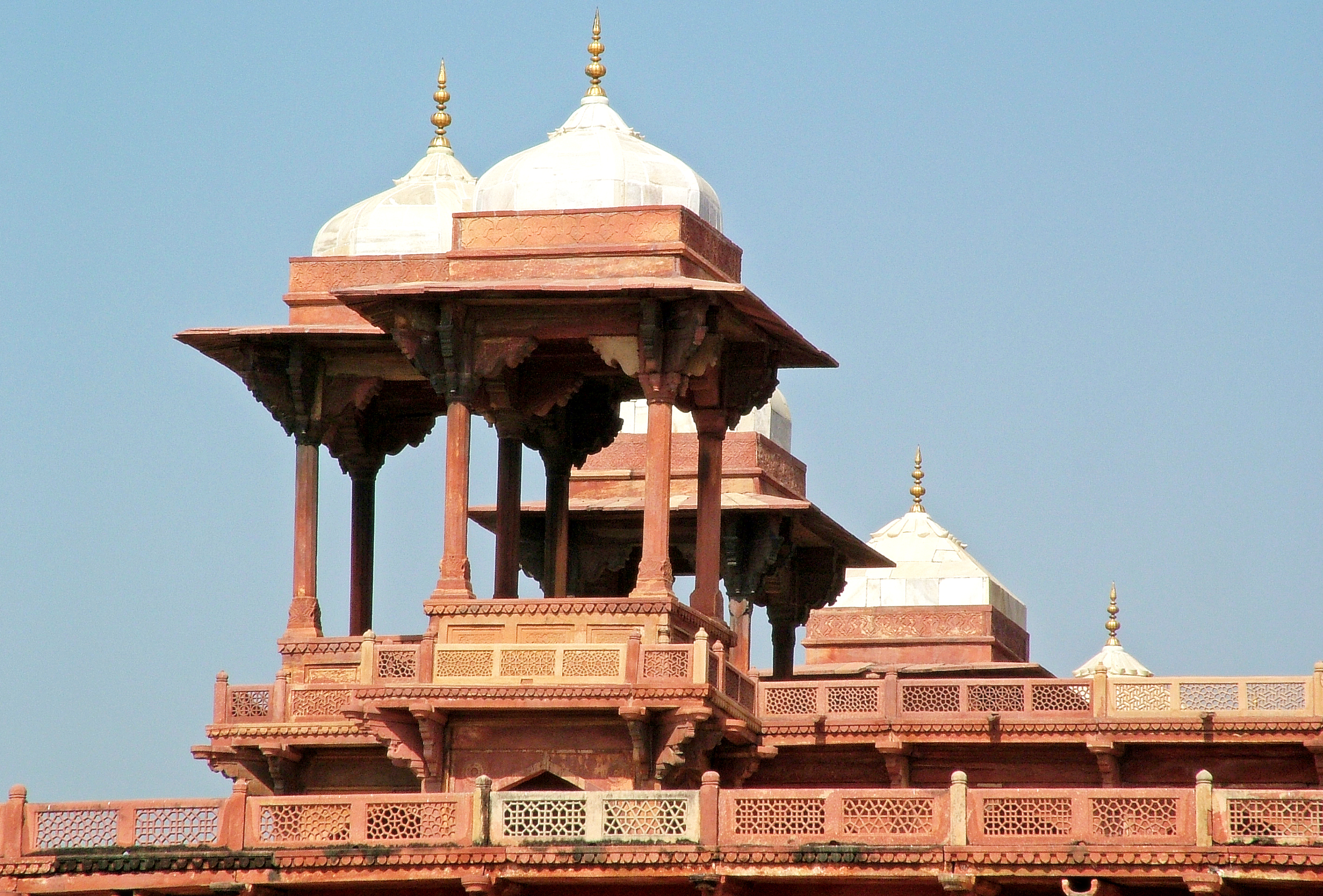
The architecture of Akbar's tomb is reminiscent of other "Akbari" buildings, a style which died a slow death subsequently under the auspices of his son and grandson respectively.

Akbar’s architecture refers to the style of Indo-Islamic architecture conceived during the reign of Mughal Emperor Akbar using elite Indic architectural vocabulary. His successors further added to this style, leading to the unique and individualistic style of Mughal architecture. Some examples of this style are Humayun's Tomb, which was the first of a long succession of garden-tombs (and a predecessor of the Taj Mahal), the Agra Fort, the Allahabad Fort, the Lahore Fort, the abandoned city of Fatehpur Sikri and Akbar's own tomb.

Fusion of Indian and Islamic features as multiplicity

== History of the style ==
Akbar was the third Mughal Emperor and also the architect of the Mughal Empire in India. Although he was illiterate, Akbar showed a profound interest in Literature and the Arts. That, coupled with his pride and curiosity of his Timurid ancestry and the desire to embrace India as a native country, were the beginnings of his religious and design philosophies.

In its essence, the style consisted of a synthesis of earlier styles, Hindu/Jain/Buddhist and Persian/Timurid. Abu'l-Fazl ibn Mubarak, Akbar's court chronicler, and one of his 'Navratnas' or nine gems of his court, describes the architects and designers as lofty minded mathematicians and says the Emperor's style of architecture was understandable only to the scientifically oriented.

The artisans who migrated with his father from Persia brought in their styles, which mingled with the indigenous styles of India. The lavish use of red sandstone sought to minimize the stylistic clashes consequent to the mixing of these disparate elements. All these buildings reflected Akbar's design and architectural philosophy. This is the "Akbari" style of architecture

For example, Akbar's tomb, though Islamic in spirit, is a blend of styles. The magnificent entrance, use of exquisite patterns, excellent jaali work (intricately perforated decorative stone screens), fine Persian style calligraphy, the charbagh garden layout (four-quartered garden layout, with the main building at the center), etc., are representative of Islamic influence. On the other hand, the absence of a dome, use of chhatris (small domed canopies, supported by pillars), tiers of airy pavilions, etc., reflect a local influence, which are also found in the buildings built by Akbar in Agra Fort and Fatehpur Sikri.

As with all the other administrative and political aspects of Akbar's imperial career, it was Sher Shah Suri's architecture that he drew inspiration from. Suri architecture was a continuation of the older Lodi Style.

== See also ==
- Shah Jahani architecture
