= HMS Akbar =

Four ships of the Royal Navy have borne the name HMS Akbar, the Arabic word for Great. Two others were planned but never commissioned:

- HMS Akbar was to have been a 74-gun third rate. She was laid down in 1807 but was cancelled in 1809.
- HMS Akbar was a 54-gun fourth rate, the former East Indiaman Marquis Cornwallis, launched in 1801 and purchased in 1805. and renamed Cornwallis. She was renamed HMS Akbar in 1811 and used as a troopship. She was used for harbour service from 1824 and was sold in 1862.
- HMS Akbar was a training ship launched in 1816 as the 74-gun third rate HMS Hero. She was renamed HMS Wellington in 1816 and Akbar in 1862. She was sold for breaking up in 1906.
- HMS Akbar (1841) was a wooden paddle frigate launched in 1841 and sold in 1859.
- HMS Akbar was an iron-hulled screw-propelled ship launched in 1876 as HMS Temeraire. She became a training ship in 1904 and was renamed HMS Indus II, and then HMS Akbar in 1915. She was sold in 1921.
- HMS Akbar was to have been a Catherine-class minesweeper. She was launched in 1942 but retained for service with the United States Navy.

== See also ==
- Akbar (disambiguation)
