= Akbarian =

Akbarian (Persian: اکبریان) is an Iranian surname. Notable people with the surname include:

- Aziz Akbarian (born 1957), Iranian politician
- Hashem Akbarian (1897–1971), Iranian wrestler

== Other ==
- Akbariyya, Akbarian school in Sufism, based on the teachings of Ibn 'Arabi
