= Hashem Akbari =

Iranian-American academic

- هاشم اکبری
- Born: 13 August 1949; Iran
- Education: University of California, Berkeley (PhD)

Hashem Akbari (born 13 August 1949) is an Iranian-American professor of Architectural, Civil, and Environmental engineering at Concordia University. He specializes in research on the effects of urban heat islands, cool roofs, asphalt paving materials, and energy efficiency in building.

== Biography ==
Akbari was born in Iran. In 1979, he received his Ph.D. in Nuclear Engineering at the University of California, Berkeley. In 1991, he became a U.S. citizen . He was a senior scientist and the leader of the Heat Island Group at Environmental Energy Technologies Division of Lawrence Berkeley National Laboratory (LBNL) at the University of California, Berkeley, from 1983 to 2009. In 1985, he founded the Urban Heat Island (UHI) group, where he worked in the areas of heat-island quantification and mitigation. In 2009, he joined Concordia University, Canada, where he founded a laboratory to measure solar spectral reflectance and thermal emittance of common construction materials.

== Research ==
Akbari conducted research on the potential for cool roofing and paving materials to reduce the urban heat island effect. He proposed work in adapting cool roofs as a "prescriptive" requirement for low-slope non-residential buildings in California. In 2003, his proposal was approved by the California Energy Commission; it went into effect later in October 2005. He provided basis and assistance for the development of cool roof standards in Florida, Chicago, Georgia, and Atlanta.

His research has quantified the effect of cool roofs on increasing surface albedo to cool the globe. In 2004, Akbari stated that the city of Osaka in Japan had instituted a $1.7 billion (¥170 billion) program of cool roofs, green roofs, and urban trees as a result of his research. Akbari's other contributions to the development of several international standards are:

- ASTM standard E1918 (Standard Test Method for Measuring Solar Reflectance of Small Horizontal and Low-Sloped Surfaces in the Field)
- ASTM standard E1980 (Standard Practice for Calculating Solar Reflectance Index of Horizontal and Low-Sloped Opaque Surfaces)
- ASTM task group to develop a standard for accelerated aging of roofing materials (ASTM D7897 – 15: Standard Practice for Laboratory Soiling and Weathering of Roofing Materials to Simulate Effects of Natural Exposure on Solar Reflectance and Thermal Emittance)
- ASTM standards for solar reflectance and thermal emittance measurements
- ASHRAE Standards Committees of Standard 90.1: New commercial buildings
- ASHRAE Standard 90.2: New residential buildings, and updated the standards to offer credits for roofs with high solar reflectance
- A contributing member to ASHRAE Technical Committees: TC 1.4 (Control Theory and Application), TC 1.5 (Computer Applications), TC 4.7 (Energy Calculations), TC 7.1 (Integrated Building Design), TC 7.5 (Smart Building Systems), and TC 7.6 (Building Energy Performance)

He contributed to the writing of two chapters for the ASHRAE Application Handbook: (1) Building Energy Monitoring and (2) Energy Use and Management. He published a guidebook for urban heat island mitigation. Akbari is one of the founding organizers of the Global Cool Cities Alliance (vice Chairman of the Board, Technical committee chair), the Cool Roof Rating Council (CRRC) (Ex-Officio Board Member, International Committee Chair), and the European Cool Roof Council (ECPR) (Ex-Officio Board Member). In addition to the standards development, Akbari also contributed to the Intergovernmental Panel on Climate Change, which won the 2007 Nobel Peace Prize.
