= Aziz Akbarian =

Iranian politician

Head of Parliament of Iran's Commission on Industries and Mines
- In office 19 June 2016 – 26 May 2020
- Preceded by: Reza Rahmani

Member of the Islamic Consultative Assembly
- In office 3 May 2008 – 26 May 2020
- Preceded by: Rashid Jalali
- Constituency: Karaj, Fardis, Eshtehard and Asara
- Majority: 179,589 (9th)

Personal details
- Born: Aziz Akbarian عزیز اکبریان; 12 March 1957 (age 69) Hashtrud, East Azerbaijan, Iran
- Party: Principlists
- Occupation: Politician
- Profession: Military

Military service
- Allegiance: Iran
- Branch/service: Islamic Revolutionary Guard Corps
- Years of service: 1979–2006
- Rank: Sardar of Sepah
- Unit: Military intelligence
- Battles/wars: Iran–Iraq War

Aziz Akbarian (Persian: ‌‌عزیز اکبریان; born 1957) is an far-right Iranian politician.

Akbarian was born in Hashtrud near Tabriz in East Azerbaijan. He was a member of the 8th, 9th, and 10th Islamic Consultative Assembly from the electorate of Karaj, Fardis, Eshtehard, and Asara. Akbarian won with 148,218 votes.

Akbarian favours executions and flogging. On 22 December 2018, he said in an interview with the local Alborz Radio, "If two people are thoroughly flogged and if two people are executed ... it will be a lesson for everyone else."
