= Akbari, Fars =

Akbari اكبري
- Village
- Location within Iran
- Coordinates: 30°20′56″N 51°17′15″E
- Country: Iran
- Province: Fars
- County: Rostam
- Bakhsh: Sorna
- Rural District: Rostam-e Seh

Population (2006)
  - Total: 673
- Time zone: UTC+3:30 (IRST)
  - Summer (DST): UTC+4:30 (IRDT)

Akbari (Persian: اكبري, also Romanized as Akbarī) is a village in Rostam-e Seh Rural District, Sorna District, Rostam County, Fars province, Iran. At the 2006 census, its population was 673, in 131 families.
