= Suzanne Conklin Akbari =

American philologist

Academic background
- Education: Columbia University

Academic work
- Discipline: Medievalist
- Sub-discipline: Global Middle Ages; Literary history
- Institutions: University of Toronto; Institute for Advanced Study

Suzanne Conklin Akbari is a medievalist, recognised for her global and comparative approach to medieval literary history. She was a Professor in English and Medieval Studies at the University of Toronto from 1995 until 2019, when she joined the Institute for Advanced Study, Princeton.

== Biography ==
Akbari earned her B.A. from Johns Hopkins University in 1984. At Columbia University, she earned an M.A. in English in 1989, an M. Phil. in English and Comparative Literature in 1991, and a Ph.D. in English and Comparative literature in 1995. She began teaching at the University of Toronto in 1995, where she served as a Professor in the Department of English, as well as the Director of the Centre for Medieval Studies from 2013 to 2019. In July 2019, Akbari left the University of Toronto to join the Institute for Advanced Study.

Akbari's first monograph, Seeing Through the Veil (2004), ties medieval use of allegory to the medieval debate about whether visual perception occurs through extramission or intromission. Her second monograph, Idols in the East (2009), presents a prehistory of orientalism in which Western Christian medieval writing associated Islam with idolatry. Later work includes research as a co-Principal Investigator for an Andrew W. Mellon Foundation grant, "The Book and the Silk Roads," begun in 2019 to study medieval transmission of book technologies along the Silk Road trade routes between China and Europe. With Filiz Çakır Phillip, she co-curated the exhibition 'Hidden Stories: Books Along the Silk Roads', which ran at the Aga Khan Museum from October 2021 to February 2022.

In 2013, Akbari was an organizer for the grassroots group "Keep Back Campus Green," which sought to block the development of an artificial turf athletic field behind the University of Toronto's University College buildings, arguing that the Back Campus Fields ought to be protected as a heritage site. They were unsuccessful.

Akbari co-hosts a literary podcast, The Spouter-Inn, with Chris Piuma, which was nominated in the Outstanding Arts Series of the 2020 Canadian Podcast Awards. Begun in 2019, the podcast consists of unscripted conversations about "great" literature.

== Books ==
- Seeing Through the Veil: Optical Theory and Medieval Allegory, University of Toronto Press, 2004.
- Co-editor, Marco Polo and the Encounter of East and West, with Amilcare Iannucci, University of Toronto Press, 2008.
- Idols in the East: Representations of Islam and the Orient, 1100-1450, Cornell University Press, 2009.
- Co-editor, A Sea of Languages: Rethinking the Arabic Role in Medieval Literary History, with Karla Mallette, University of Toronto Press, 2013.
- Co-editor, The Ends of the Body, with Jill Ross, University of Toronto Press, 2013.
- Editor, How We Write: Thirteen Ways of Looking at a Blank Page, Punctum Books, 2015.
- Co-editor, How We Read: Tales, Fury, Nothing, Sound, with Kaitlin Heller, Punctum Books, 2019.
- Co-editor, Oxford Handbook of Chaucer, with James Simpson, Oxford University Press, 2020.
- Co-editor, Norton Anthology of World Literature.
