= Lahore Fort =

Citadel in Lahore, Pakistan

Lahore Fort شاہی قلعہ
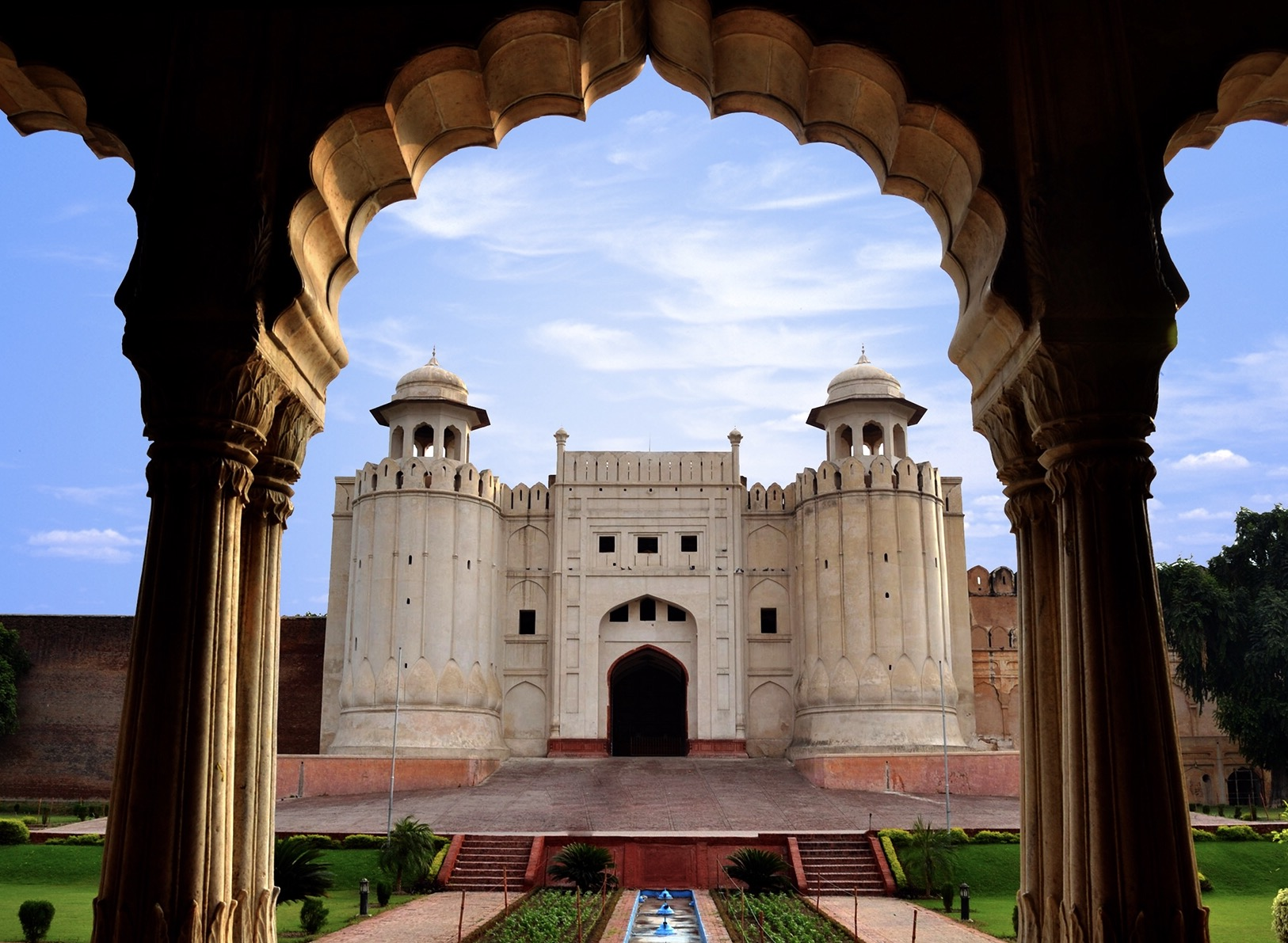
- View of the Alamgiri Gate of the fort

- Location within Lahore Location within Pakistan
- 31°35′16″N 74°18′54″E
- Location: Lahore, Punjab, Pakistan

History
- Built: 1566; 460 years ago

Site notes
- Architectural styles: Mughal, Indo-Islamic
- Owner: Mughal Empire (1566–1752); Sikh Confederacy (1765–1799); Sikh Empire (1799–1849); British East India Company (1849–1858); British Empire (1858–1947); Federal Government of Pakistan (1947–present)

UNESCO World Heritage Site
- Part of: Fort and Shalamar Gardens in Lahore
- Criteria: Cultural: i, ii, iii
- Reference: 171-001
- Inscription: 1981 (5th Session)

The Lahore Fort (Punjabi: شاہی قلعہ, romanised: Śā'ī Qilā; Urdu: شاہی قلعہ, romanised: Shahi Qilah; lit. 'Royal Fort') is a citadel in the Walled City of Lahore in Punjab, Pakistan. The fortress is located at the northern end of the Walled City and is spread over an area greater than 20 hectares (49 acres). It contains 21 notable monuments, some of which date to the era of emperor Akbar. It was almost entirely rebuilt in the 17th century, when the Mughal Empire was at its zenith.

Though the site of the present fort has been inhabited for millennia, the first record of a fortified structure at the site was that of an 11th-century mudbrick fort. The foundations of the present fort was laid in 1566, during the reign of Akbar, in a syncretic architectural style that featured both Islamic and Hindu motifs. Additions from the period of Shah Jahan are characterised by marble with inlaid Persianate floral designs, while its Alamgiri Gate was constructed by Aurangzeb, and faces the Badshahi Mosque.

After the fall of the Mughal Empire, Lahore Fort was used as the residence of Maharaja Ranjit Singh, founder of the Sikh Empire. The Sikhs made several additions to the fort. It then passed to the control of the East India Company after they annexed Punjab following their victory over the Sikhs at the Battle of Gujrat in February 1849. In 1981, the fort was inscribed as a UNESCO World Heritage Site for its "outstanding repertoire" of Mughal monuments dating from the era when the empire was at its artistic and aesthetic zenith.

== Location ==
The fort is located in the northern part of Lahore walled city. The Alamgiri gate is part of an ensemble of buildings, which along with the Badshahi Mosque, Roshnai Gate, and Samadhi of Ranjit Singh, form a quadrangle around the Hazuri Bagh. The Minar-e-Pakistan and Iqbal Park are adjacent to the northern boundary of the fort.

== History ==
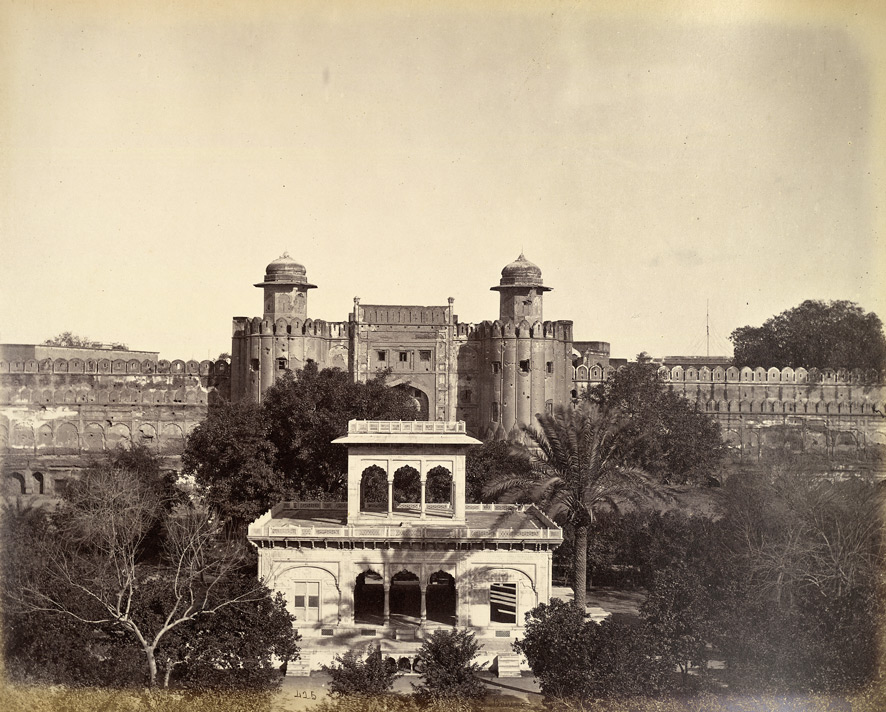
A view of the Lahore Fort (Alamgiri Gate in background) and Hazuri Bagh Pavilion (foreground) in 1870.

=== Early history ===
Though the site is known to have been inhabited for millennia, the origins of Lahore Fort are obscure and traditionally based on various myths.

=== Delhi Sultanate ===
The first historical reference to a fort at the site is from the 11th century during the rule of Mahmud of Ghazni. It was made of mud and was destroyed in 1241 by the Mongol Empire during the siege of Lahore in 1241. A new fort was constructed in 1267 at the site by Sultan Balban of the Mamluk dynasty of the Delhi Sultanate. The rebuilt fort was destroyed in 1398 by the invading forces of Timur, only to be rebuilt by Mubarak Shah Sayyid in 1421. In the 1430s, the fort was briefly occupied by the Timurid governor of Kabul Shaikh Ali. It later remained under the control of the Lodi dynasty until Lahore was captured by the Mughal emperor Babur in 1526.

=== Mughal era ===
==== Akbar period ====
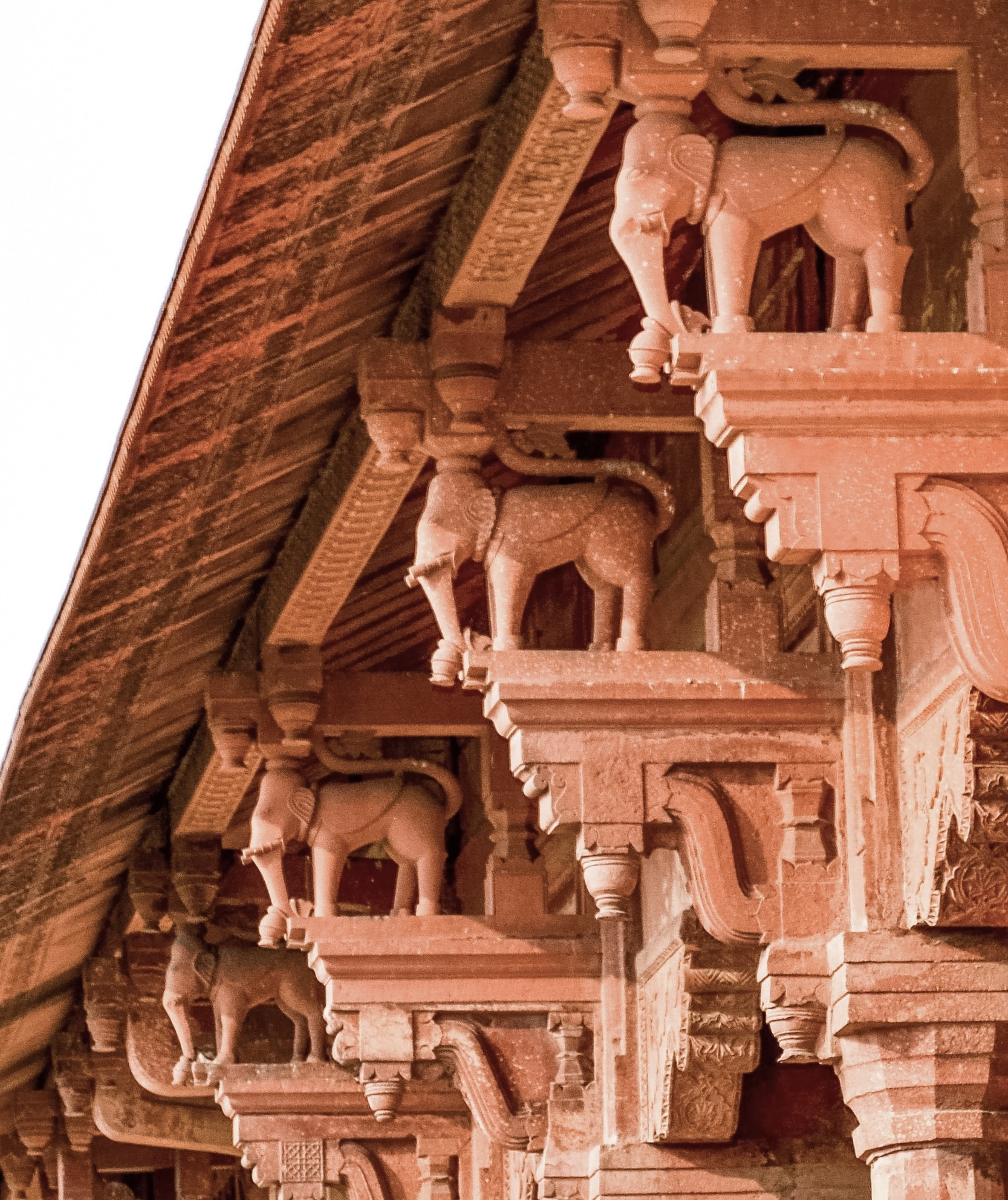
The use of elephant-shaped column brackets in buildings of the Lahore Fort reflects the influence of Hindu motifs on Mughal architecture during the reign of Akbar.

The present design and structure of the fort trace its origins to 1566 when the Mughal Emperor Akbar occupied the site as a post to guard the northwest frontier of the empire. The strategic location of Lahore, between the Mughal territories and the strongholds of Kabul, Multan, and Kashmir necessitated the dismantling of the old mud-fort and fortification with solid brick masonry. Lofty palaces were built over time, along with lush gardens. Notable Akbar period structures included the Doulat Khana-e-Khas-o-Am, Jharoka-e-Darshan, and Akbari Gate. Many Akbari structures were modified or replaced by subsequent rulers.

==== Jahangir period ====
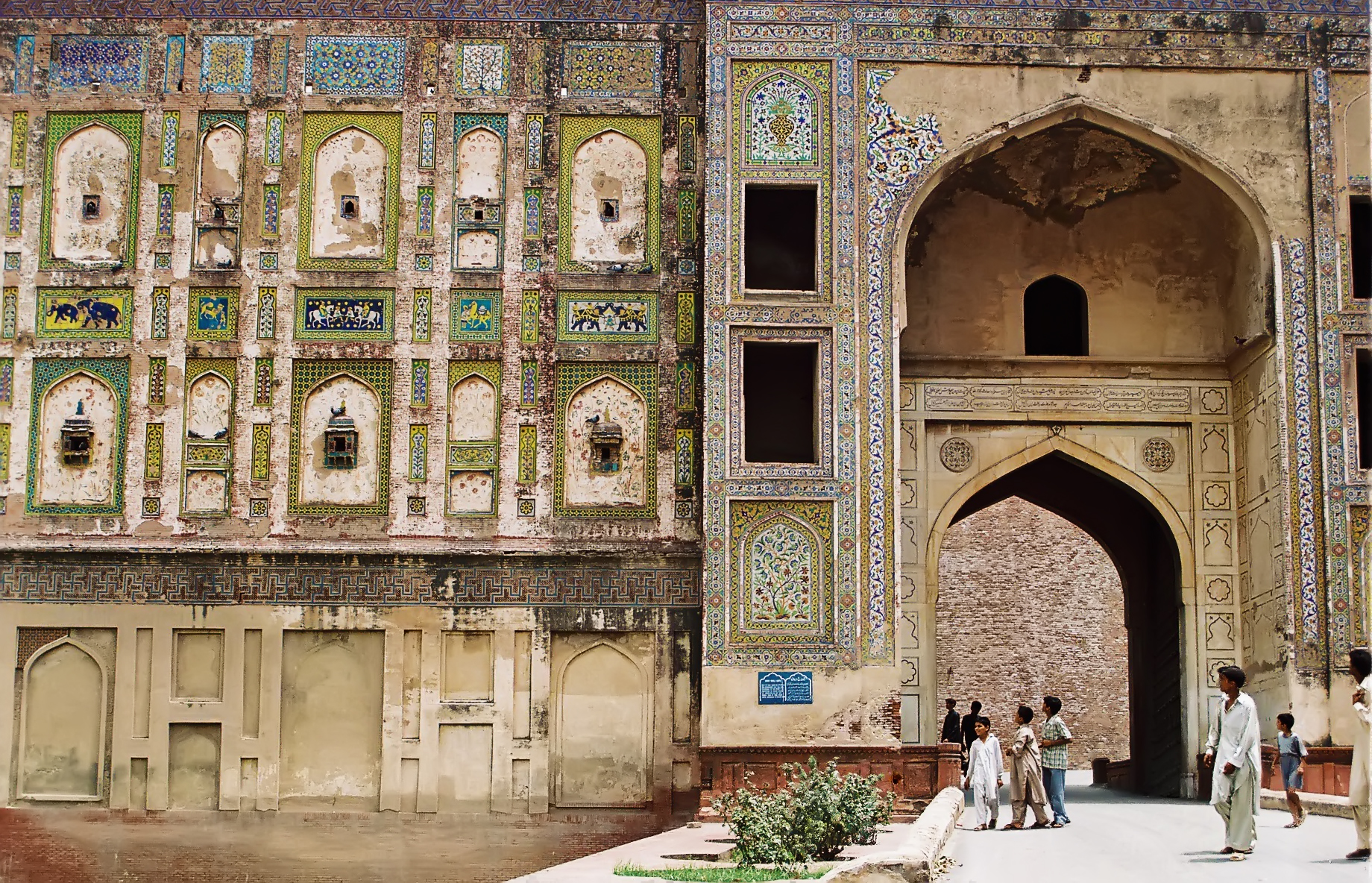
The fort's massive Picture Wall dates from the Jahangir period.

Emperor Jahangir first mentions his alterations to the fort in 1612 when describing the Maktab Khana. Jahangir also added the Kala Burj pavilion, which features European-inspired angels on its vaulted ceiling. British visitors to the fort noted Christian iconography during the Jahangir period, with paintings of the Madonna and Jesus found in the fort complex. In 1606, Guru Arjan of the Sikh faith was imprisoned at the fort before his death.

Jahangir bestowed the massive Picture Wall, a 440 metres (1,450 ft) by 15 metres (50 ft) wall which is decorated with a vibrant array of glazed tile, faience mosaics, and frescoes. On the spandrels of the large arched panels below Jahangir's Khwabgah (the Imperial Bedchamber) are azdahas or winged dragons from ancient Persian mythology, cup-bearing angel figures herons, cranes and other flying birds. Many of the scenes displayed on this 'Picture Wall' illustrate the court life of the Mughal sovereigns, their sports and their pastimes. One of the panels shows four horsemen playing the noble game of Vaughan, nowadays known as polo. Most prominent are those relating to elephant fights, which were one of the favourite recreations of the Mughal court.

The Begum Shahi Mosque was built adjacent to the forts of the eastern walls during the reign of Jahangir. While the mosque likely served as a Friday congregational mosque for members of the royal court, it was not financed by Jahangir, although it likely required his approval. The foundation of this mosque was laid by the empress Mariam-uz-Zamani in the year 1611.

==== Shah Jahan period ====
Shah Jahan's first contribution to the fort commenced in the year of his coronation, 1628, and continued until 1645. Shah Jahan first ordered the construction of the Diwan-i-Aam in the style of a Chehel Sotoun - a Persian style 40-pillar public audience hall. Though construction of the Shah Burj commenced under Jahangir, Shah Jahan was displeased with its design and appointed Asif Khan to oversee reconstruction. Shah Jahan's Shah Burj forms a quadrangle with the famous Sheesh Mahal, and Naulakha Pavilion. Both are attributed to Shah Jahan, although the Naulakha Pavilion may be a later addition possibly from the Sikh era. The white marble Moti Masjid, or Pearl Mosque, also dates from the Shah Jahan period.

==== Aurangzeb period ====
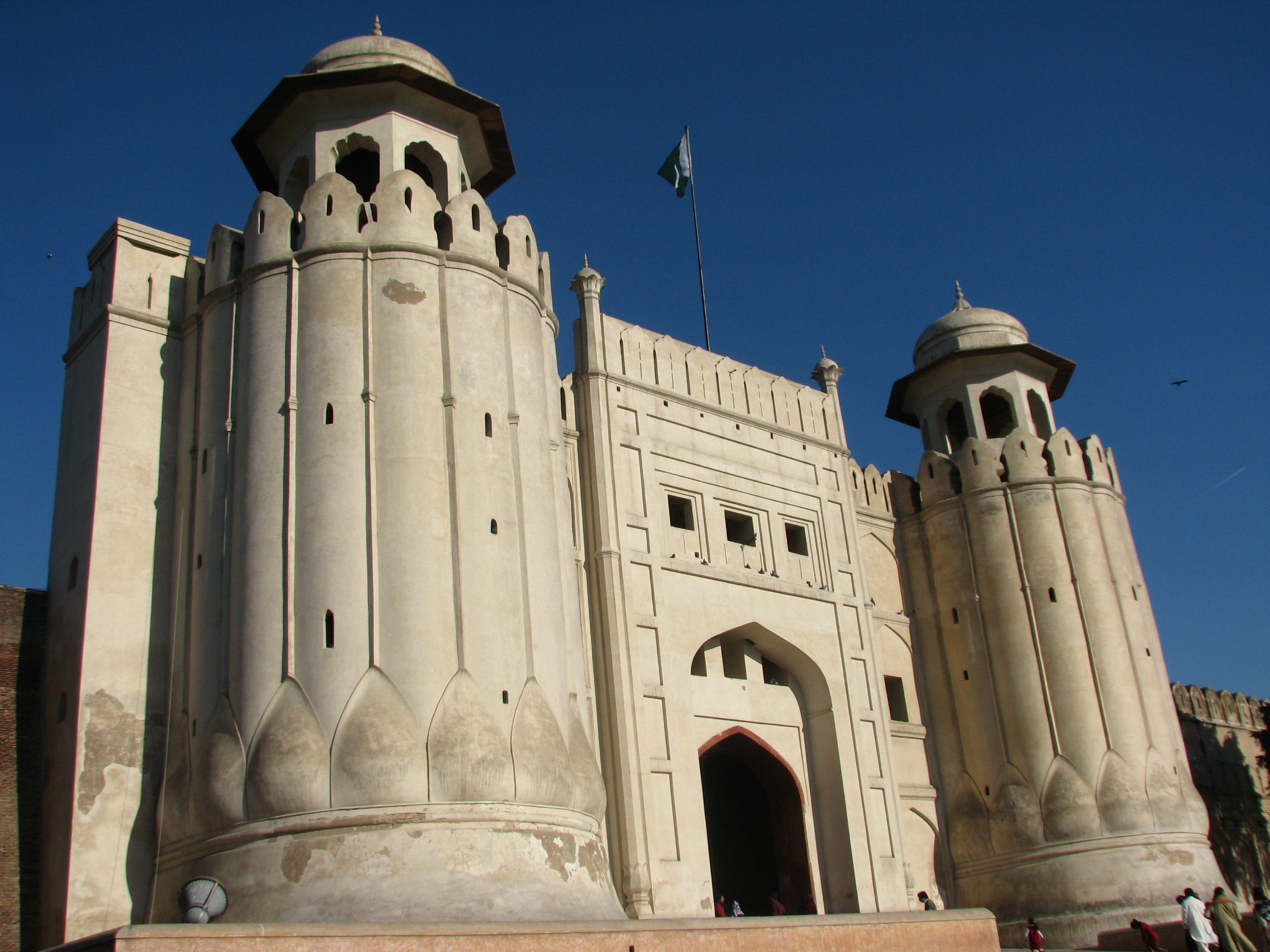
The fort's Alamgiri Gate was built during the reign of Emperor Aurangzeb.

Emperor Aurangzeb, built the Alamgiri Gate, whose semi-circular bastions and domed cupolas are a widely recognised symbol of Lahore that was once featured on Pakistani currency.

=== Sikh era ===
The Mughals lost the fort to the Afghan Durranis, who in turn briefly lost the fort to Maratha forces before being recaptured by the Durranis. The fort was then captured by the Bhangi Misl, one of the twelve Sikh misls of Punjab that ruled Lahore from 1765 until 1799.

==== Ranjit Singh period ====
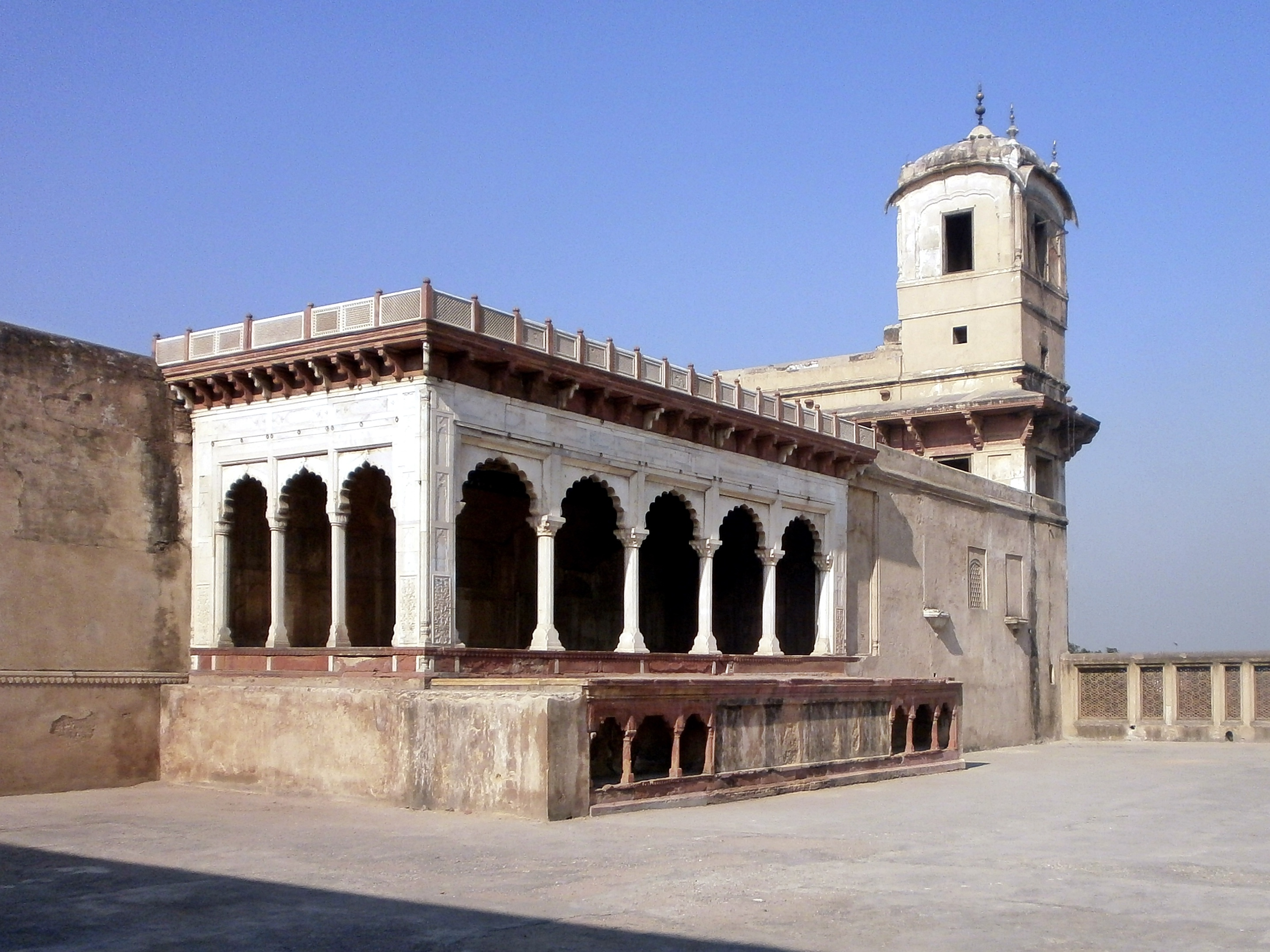
Ath Dara, built during the reign of Maharaja Ranjit Singh and used as his court.

The fort fell to the army of Ranjit Singh, who took Lahore from the Bhangi Misl in 1799. During their occupation of the fort, the Sikhs made many additions to the fort and repurposed portions of it for their own use. The Hazuri Bagh garden and its central baradari were constructed during Sikh rule to celebrate the maharaja's capture of the Koh-i-Noor diamond. Ranjit Singh used the fort's summer palace as his own residence, while the Moti Masjid was repurposed as a gurdwara called Moti mandir, and later used as royal treasury. The Sehdari pavilion, or "Three-doored" pavilion, was added to the fort during this period, as was the Ath dara or "Eight-doored" pavilion. The fort's Naag Temple and Lava Temple were also constructed during Sikh rule, while the Mai Jindan Haveli was extensively modified. Kharak Singh Haveli was also added. The fort's northern outer wall, parallel to the picture wall, was constructed during this period.

The fort's Diwan-i-Aam was destroyed in 1841 when the son of Ranjit Singh, Sher Singh bombarded the fort in his fight against Chand Kaur. Maharaja Ranjit Singh's elder son and successor, Kharak Singh was born in the fort to his wife, Maharani Datar Kaur. The youngest son of Ranjit Singh, Maharaja Duleep Singh was born at the fort's Mai Jindan Haveli in 1838. Duleep Singh signed the Treaty of Bhyroval in 1847 that brought the Sikh empire to an effective end. The fort and the city remained under the control of Ranjit Singh's family until the fall of the Sikh Empire in 1849.

=== Modern era ===
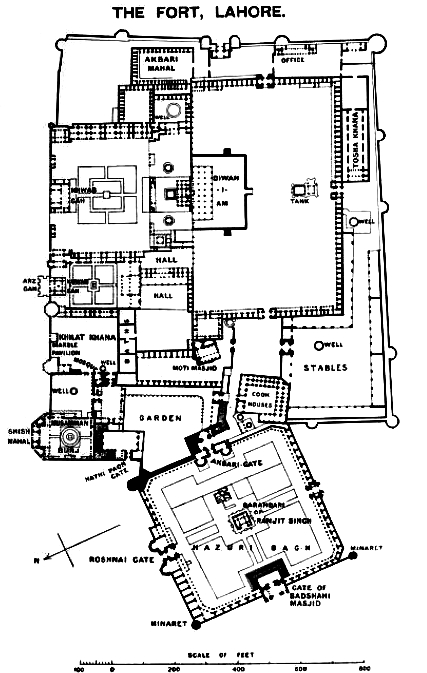
Layout of the Lahore Fort in 1911

The British occupied the fort after their conquest of Lahore, and made several modifications to it, primarily involving conversion of existing buildings for colonial use including hospitals and barracks for the British military. Excavations in 1959 in front of Diwan-i-Am led to the discovery of a gold coin dated 1025 CE belonging to Mahmud Ghaznavi. The coin was unearthed at the depth of 7.6 metres (25 ft) from the lawn. The cultural layers were continuous to the depth of 4.6 metres (15 ft) indicating that the fort was inhabited by people even before his conquest. Other pre-Mughal objects unearthed in the excavation included terracotta depicting mother goddess, horses, bulls and other figures of Hindu origin. The fort, along with the nearby Mughal gardens at Shalamar, was designated as a World Heritage Site by UNESCO in 1981.

While relaying the deteriorated floor of Akbari Gate in April 2007, three floors in the fort were unearthed belonging to the British, Sikh and Mughal periods, constructed with bricks, burnt bricks and pebbles respectively. The latter either built during Jahangir's or Shah Jahan's era was the hallmark of Mughals.

== Layout ==
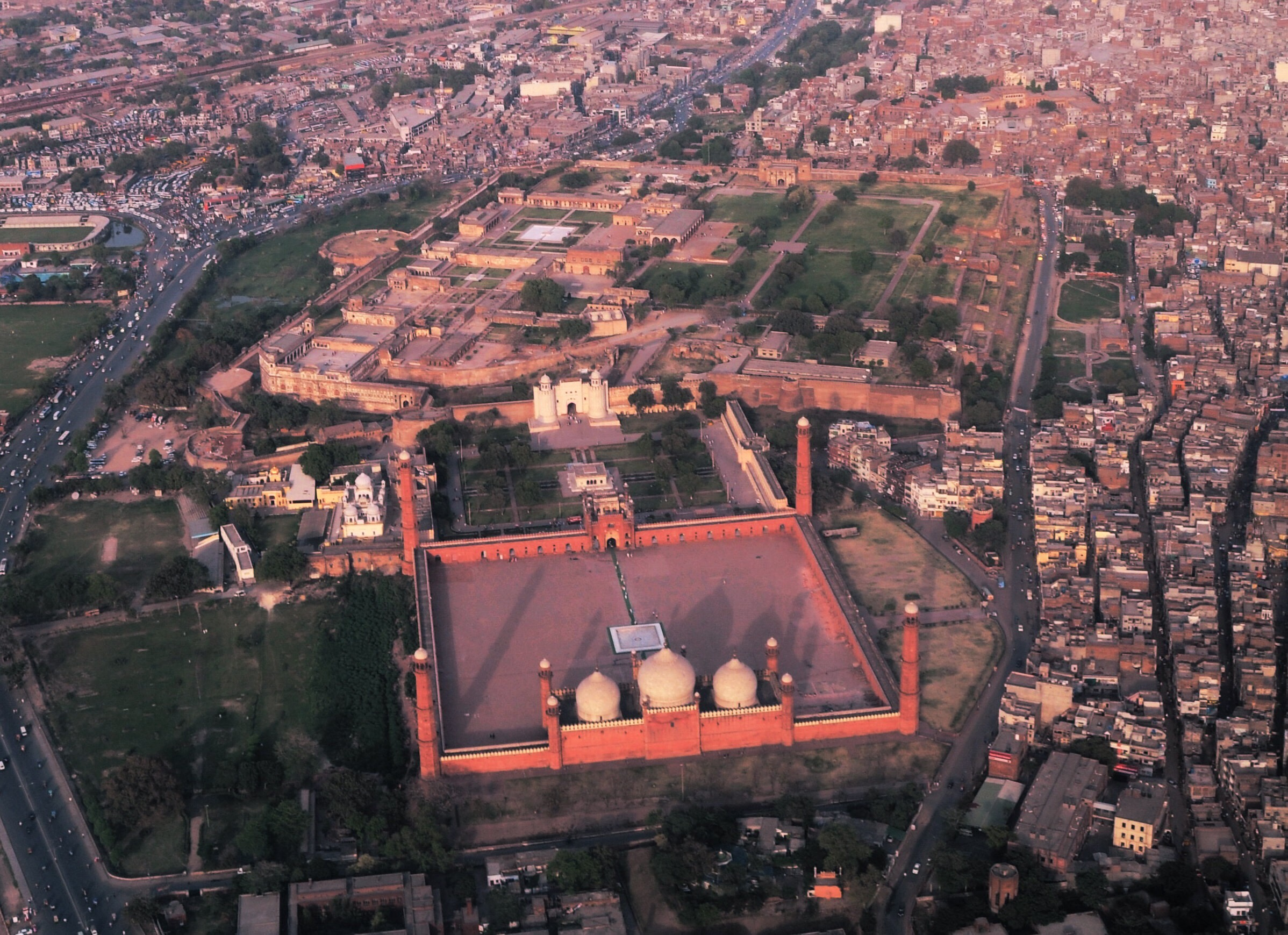
Lahore Fort is located across the Hazuri Bagh from the Badshahi Mosque (foreground).

The fort is surrounded by a high bastioned defensive wall which forms a rough parallelogram measuring 365x320 metres. The fort is itself longitudinally divided into two approximate equal halves: first, the administrative section reserved in the south, which is well connected with main entrances, and includes gardens and Diwan-e-Khas for royal audiences. The second, a private and concealed residential section is divided into courts in the north and accessible through elephant gate. It also contains Sheesh Mahal, spacious bedrooms and small gardens. In all there are five main quadrangles in Lahore Fort, namely Diwan-e-Aam, Moti Masjid Quadrangle, Jahangir's Quadrangle, Shah Jahan's Quadrangle, and Paien Bagh Quadrangle. Interior walls are decorated with blue Persian tiles, in a style called kashi kari. The original entrance faces the Maryam Zamani Mosque and the larger Alamgiri gate opens towards Hazuri Bagh through the majestic Badshahi mosque. Influence of Hindu architecture is seen in the zoomorphic corbels.

== Major structures ==
=== Shah Burj Quadrangle ===
==== Naulakha Pavilion ====
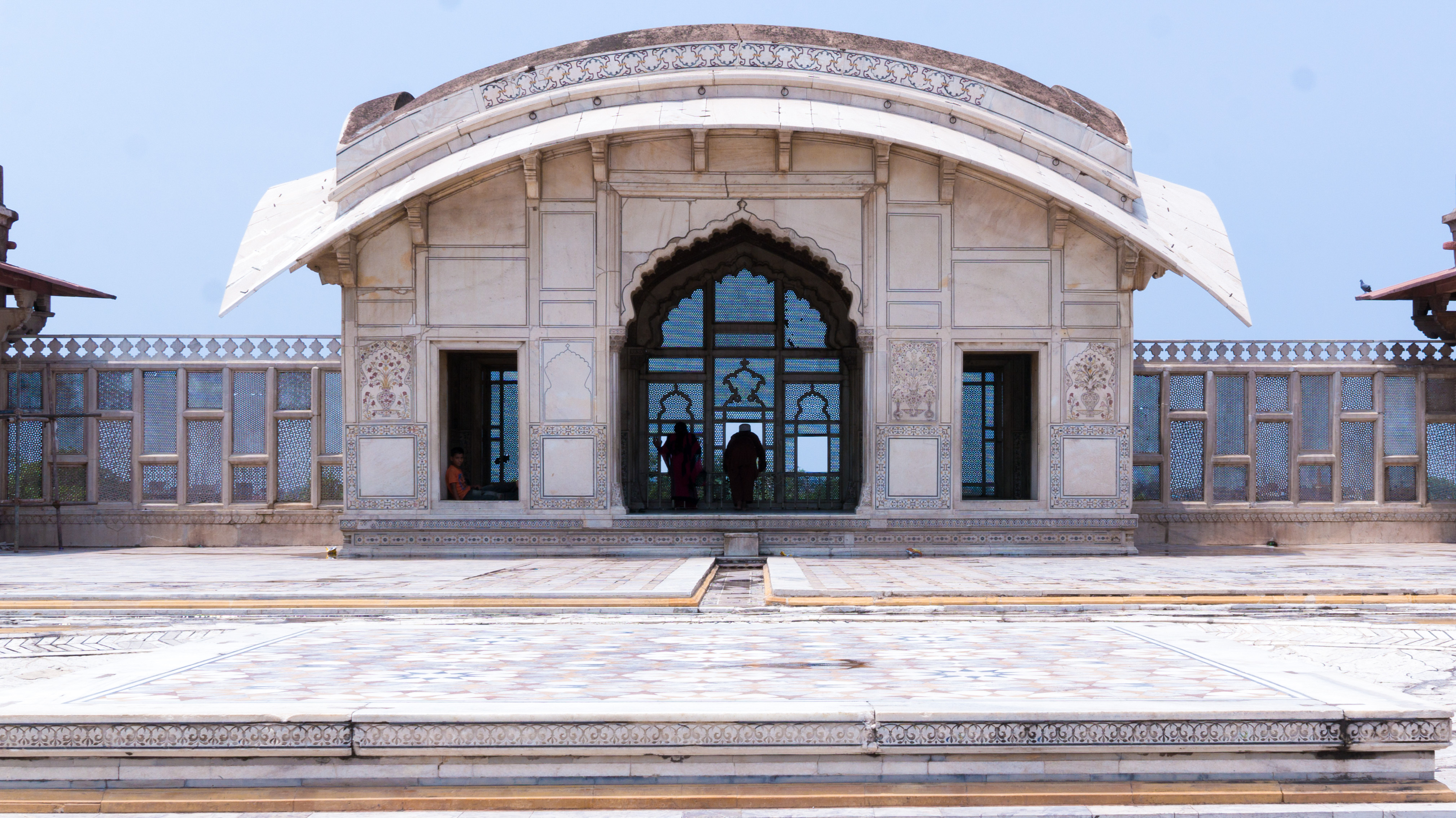
The marble Naulakha Pavilion is one of the most iconic sights at the fort.

The Naulakha Pavilion is an iconic sight of the Lahore Fort built in 1633 during the Shah Jahan period that is made of prominent white marble, and known for its distinctive curvilinear roof. It cost around 900,000 rupees, an exorbitant amount at the time. The structure derives its name from the Urdu word for 900,000, Naulakha.

The Naulakha Pavilion served as a personal chamber and was located to the west of the Sheesh Mahal, in the northern section of the fort. The pavilion served as inspiration for Rudyard Kipling, who named his Vermont home Naulakha in honour of the pavilion.

The structure was originally inlaid with precious and semi-precious stones. It reflects a mixture of contemporary traditions at the time of its construction, with a sloping-roof based on a Bengali style, and a baldachin from Europe, which makes evident the imperial as well as the religious function of the pavilion. The marble shades of the pavilion are capped with merlons to hide the view from the grounds.

==== Picture Wall ====
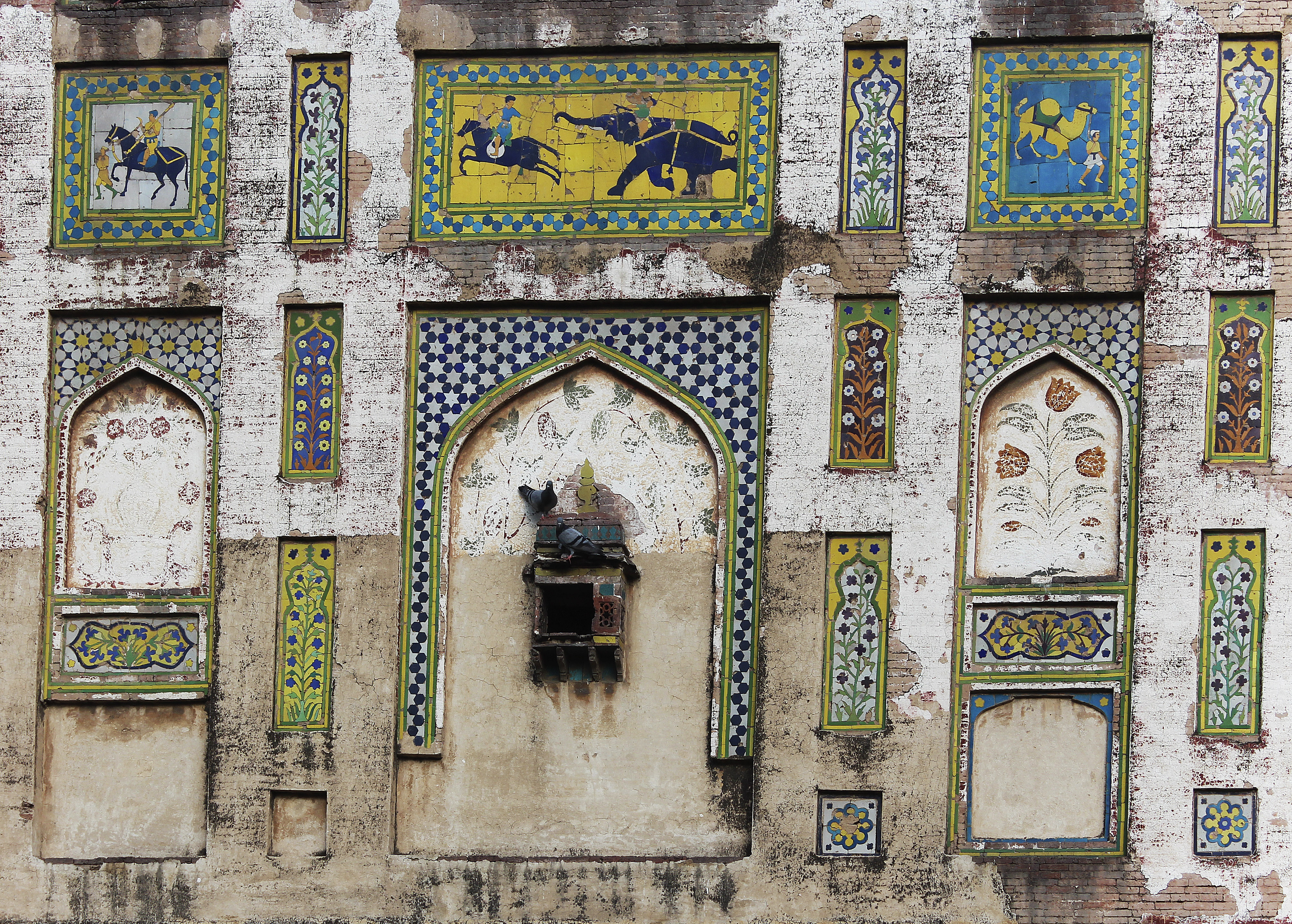
The Picture Wall features mosaics depicting a myriad of scenes.

Emperor Jahangir ordered the construction of the massive "Picture Wall", which is considered to be the greatest artistic triumph of the Lahore Fort. Unlike the Red Fort and Agra Fort, Lahore Fort's ramparts were made of brick rather than red stone. The monumental Picture Wall is a large section of the outer wall which is exquisitely decorated with a vibrant array of glazed tile, faience mosaics, and frescoes.

The embellished wall stretches over much of the fort's northern and western walls and measures approximately 440 metres (1,450 ft) by 15 metres (50 ft). The wall contains 116 panels, which depict a myriad of subjects, including elephant fights, angels, and polo games that do not form a cohesive narrative; each can be viewed in isolation. Though begun under Jahangir, the Picture Wall was decorated throughout the 1620s, and may have been completed under the reign of his son, Shah Jahan.

The Picture Wall was badly neglected and suffered from disrepair and damage. Conservation works at the site began in 2015 by the Aga Khan Trust for Culture and Walled City of Lahore Authority, which together have also restored other Lahore landmarks such as the Wazir Khan Mosque and Shahi Hammam. Detailed documentation of the wall using 3D scanner was completed in July 2016, after which conservation work would start.

==== Sheesh Mahal ====
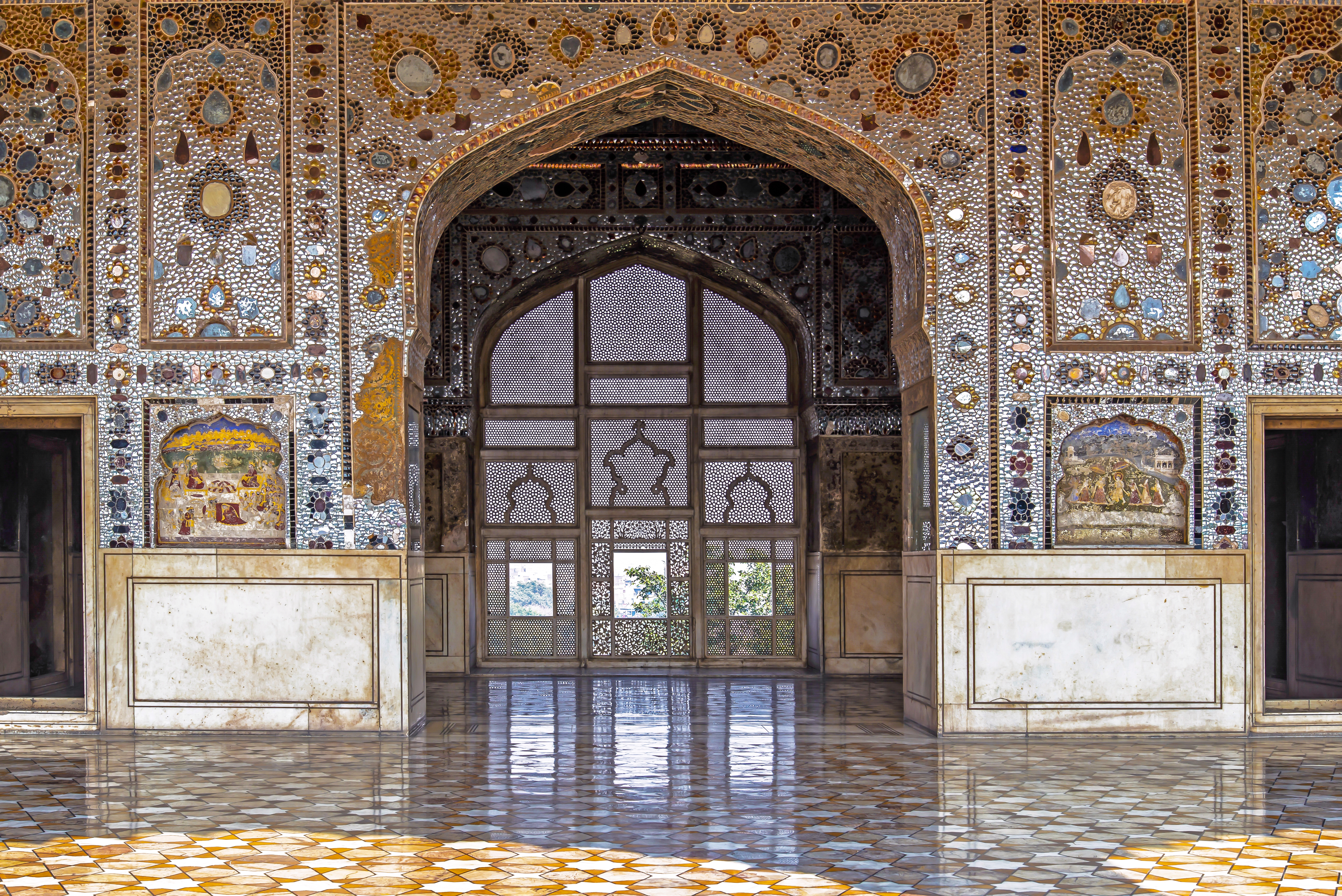
The Sheesh Mahal is elaborately decorated with a myriad of reflective glass tiles.

The Sheesh Mahal ("The Palace of Mirrors"; Urdu: شیش محل) is located within Jahangir's Shah Burj block in the northern-western corner of the Lahore Fort. It was constructed under the reign of Mughal Emperor Shah Jahan in 1631-32 by Mirza Ghiyas Begh, the grandfather of Mumtaz Mahal, and father of Nur Jahan. The ornate white marble pavilion's walls are decorated with frescoes and are inlaid with pietra dura and complex mirror-work known as Āina-kāri. It is among the best-known monuments of Lahore Fort and forms the jewel in the fort's crown. The distinctive Shah Jahani style is reflected in the extensive use of white marble, and hierarchical accents of the construction.

Sheesh Mahal was reserved for personal use by the imperial family and close aides. During the Sikh Empire, Shah Burj became Ranjit Singh's favourite place, who built a harem on top of the Sheesh Mahal. This was also the place where he would display his prized possession, the Koh-i-Noor.

==== Summer Palace ====
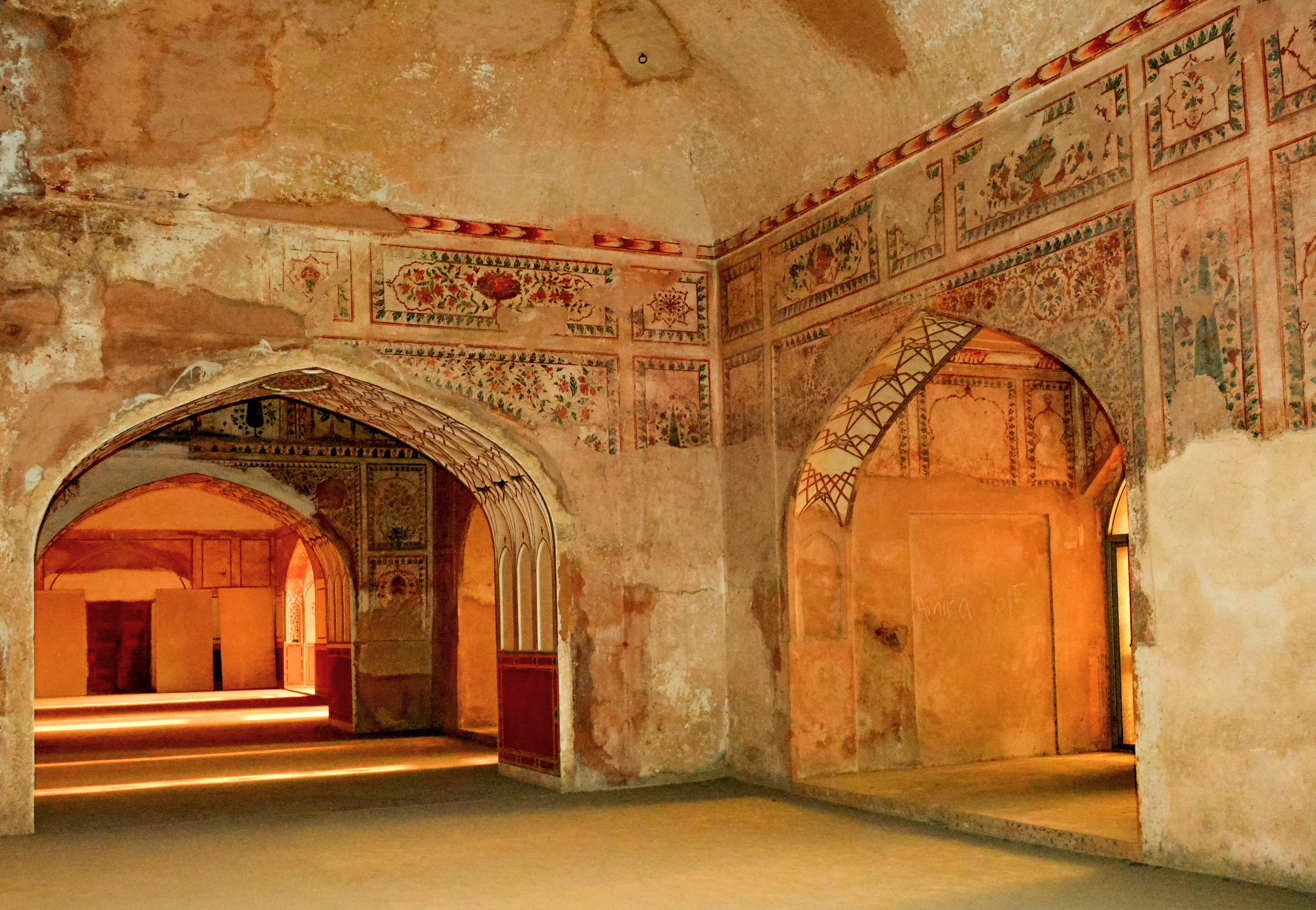
The Summer Palace is a labyrinth of chambers that was used as a residence during the hot summer months.

Located directly beneath the Sheesh Mahal and Shah Burj quadrangle is the Summer Palace, also known as the Pari Mahal, or "Fairy Palace." The palace is a labyrinth of chambers that date from the Shah Jahan period. They were used as a residence during hot weather months, as they were cooled by effective ventilation systems that channelled cool breezes into the palace. The palace's flooring system also helped cool the space - its floors were made of two layers that were separated by a layer of water pumped in from the Ravi River. Cool water perfumed by roses flowed through an elaborate system of 42 waterfalls and cascades throughout the palace.

The palace was historically only accessible from the overlying Sheesh Mahal, though a new entrance was built by the British near Hathi Pul, or "Elephant Stairs." Its walls were decorated with intricate frescoes and marble inlay that have been severely deteriorate by layers of subsequent white-washing and centuries of dampness. Passage tunnels also exist that lead from the palace to the fort's exterior where the River Ravi once flowed, suggesting that it may have been part of an escape tunnel designed to allow occupants to flee in case of attack.

The Summer Palace remained in use during the Sikh period under the reign of Ranjit Singh. After the defeat of the Sikh empire in the Second Anglo-Sikh War, it went into the hands of the East India Company and in 1858, into the hands of the British Raj, and its appointed agents and executors.

Beginning in World War 2, the Summer Palace was used as a storehouse for the British Civil Defence Department, and remained in use by Pakistan until 1973. The building's structural integrity was affected by its use as a storehouse. As of 2014, the Walled City of Lahore Authority has assumed control of the space in order to undertake restoration works with the Aga Khan Trust for Culture Following its restoration, the space will house the Lahore Fort's museum.

=== Athdara ===
Āth darā, an elevated pavilion with eight openings, was built by Maharaja Ranjit Singh for use as his court. It is located near the gate of the Shah Burj quadrangle and shares a wall with it. The structure is made of marble and red sandstone. The ceiling is decorated with colourful mirror-work, and Kangra style frescoes depicting Krishna are present on the interior walls.

=== Khilwat Khana ===
Khilwat Khana was built by Shah Jahan in 1633 to the east of the Shah Burj Pavilion, and west of the Shah Jahan Quadrangle. It was the residence of the royal ladies of the court. The plinth and door frames are made of marble with a curvilinear roof.

==== Kala Burj ====
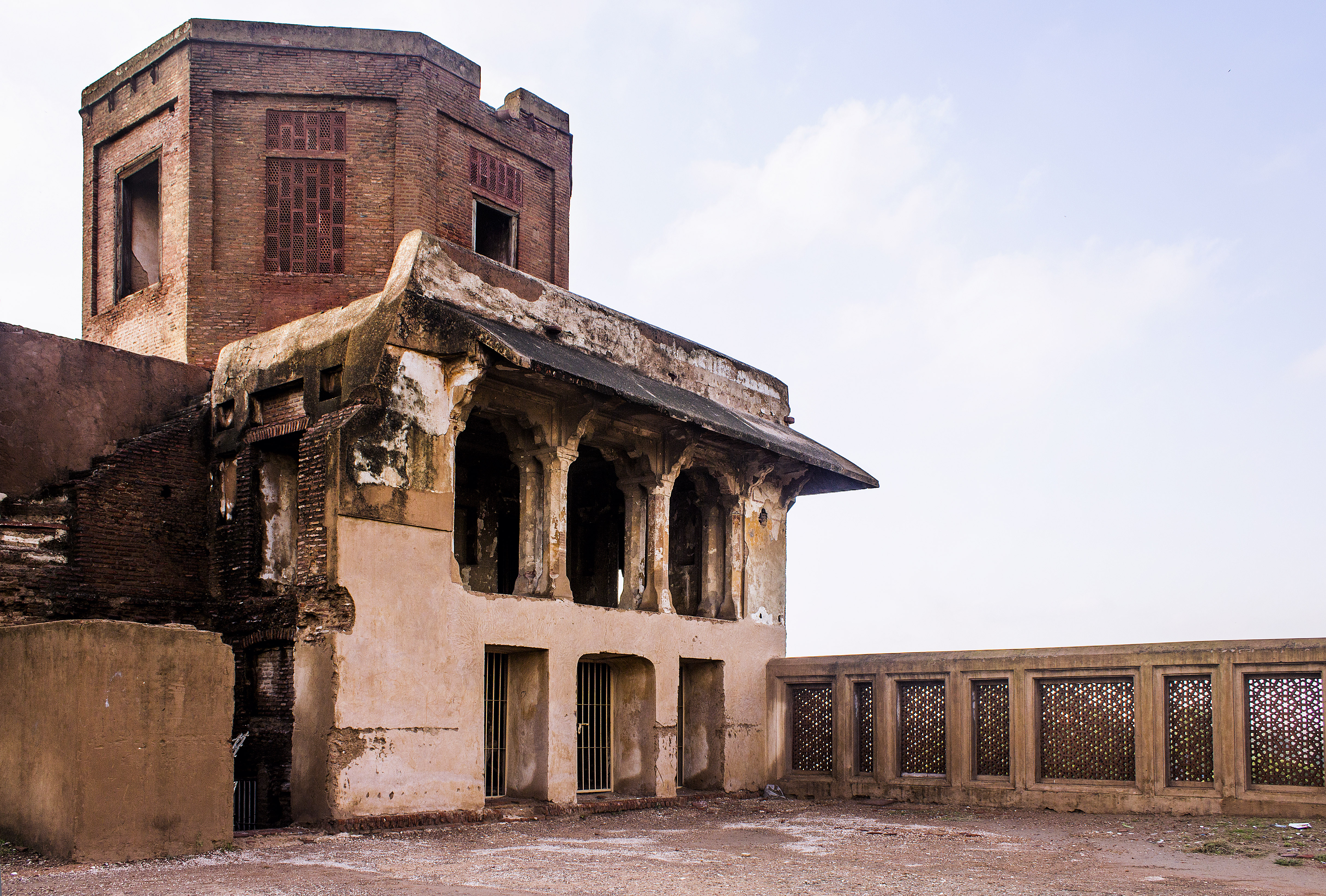
The Kala Burj.

In the northwest corner of the Khilawat Khana stands the Kala Burj ("Black Pavilion"). The pavilion is the most significant of the Jahangir-era additions to the Lahore Fort. The vaulted ceilings in the pavilion feature paintings in a European-influenced style of angels which symbolise the virtuosity of King Solomon, who is regarded as the ideal ruler in the Quran, and a ruler with whom Jahangir identified. Angels directing djinns are also painted on tiles in the ceiling, which also reference King Solomon. Kala Burj was used as a summer pavilion.

==== Lal Burj ====
In the northeast corner of the Khilawat Khana stands the Lal Burj ("Red Pavilion"). Like the nearby Kala Burj, the Lal Burj was built during the reign of Jahangir, though finished during the reign of Shah Jahan. Octagonal in shape, the Lal Burj was used as a summer pavilion. It features primary windows that opened to the north to catch cool breezes. The interior frescoes date mostly from the Sikh era, along with the entire upper level that was also added during the Sikh era.

=== Shah Jahan's Quadrangle ===
The collection of buildings surrounding the quadrangle situated between Jahangir's Quadrangle and Khilawat Khana is referred to as Shah Jahan's Quadrangle.

==== Diwan-i-Khas ====
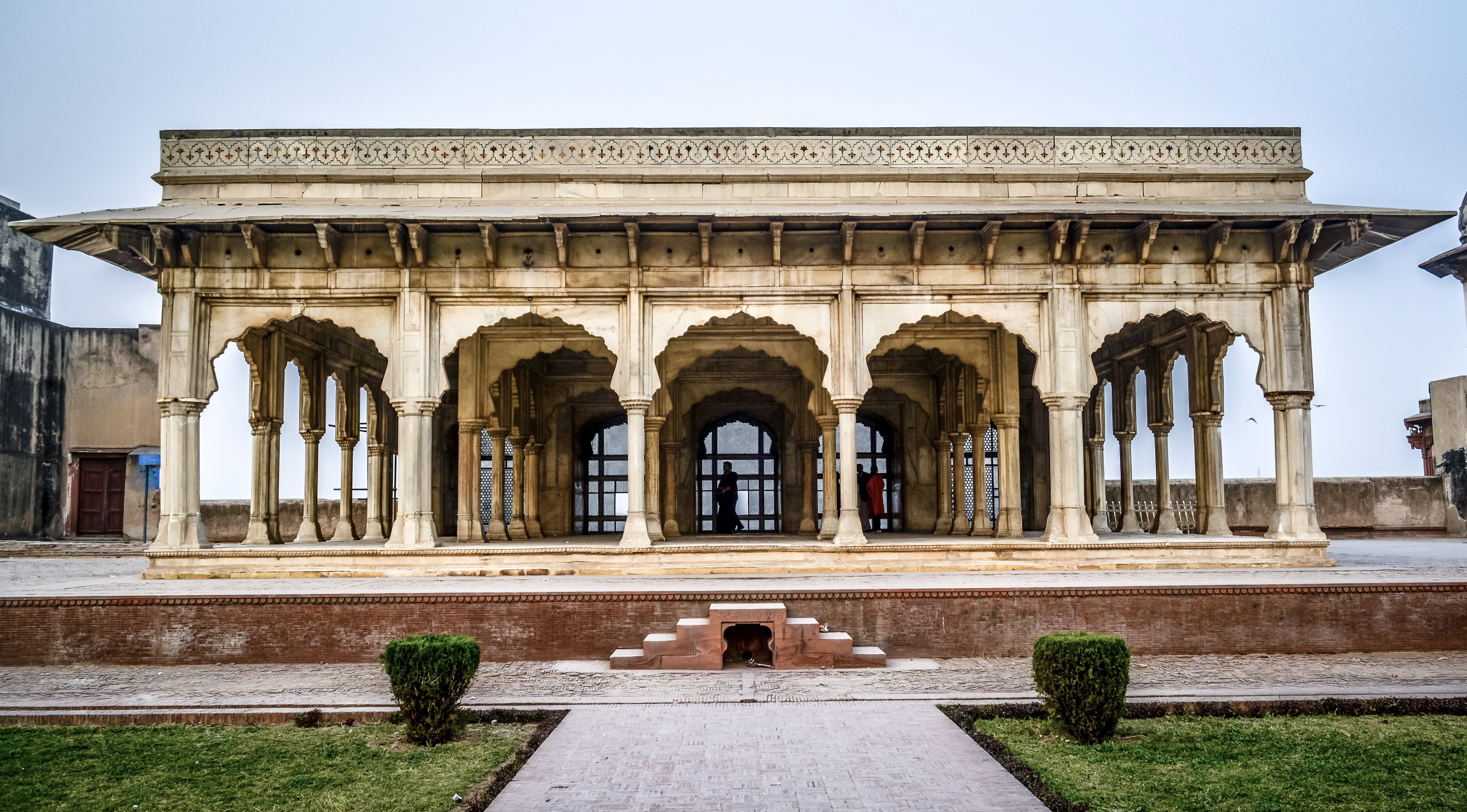
The Diwan-i-Khas is where the Emperor would attend to state affairs.

In contrast to the Diwan-i-Aam, the Diwan-i-Khas served as a hall where the Emperor would attend to matters of the state, and where courtiers and state guests were received. The hall was site of elaborate pageantry, with processions of up to one hour long occurring before each audience session.

==== The Khwabgah of Shah Jahan ====
Khwabgah was the bedroom of Shah Jahan. It was built by Shah Jahan under the supervision of Wazir Khan in 1634 during his first visit to the city. Five sleeping chambers are aligned in a single row. The chambers feature carved marble screens and are decorated with inlaid white marble and frescoes, It is the first building built by Shah Jahan in the fort. At present, its decorations have vanished except for a trace of the marble which once might have beautified the façade.

=== Jahangir's Quadrangle ===
Jahangir's Quadrangle occupies the northeastern corner of the fort. Though named for Jahangir, construction on the site began during the reign of Akbar but was completed in 1620 under Jahangir. Akbar's syncretic style is noted in the quadrangle, as it employs column brackets carved in the form of animals. The quadrangle's layout differs from other Mughal quadrangles which are based upon the layout of a Persian paradise garden and instead is formed by concentric rectangles with a fountain in its centre.

==== Diwan-i-Aam ====
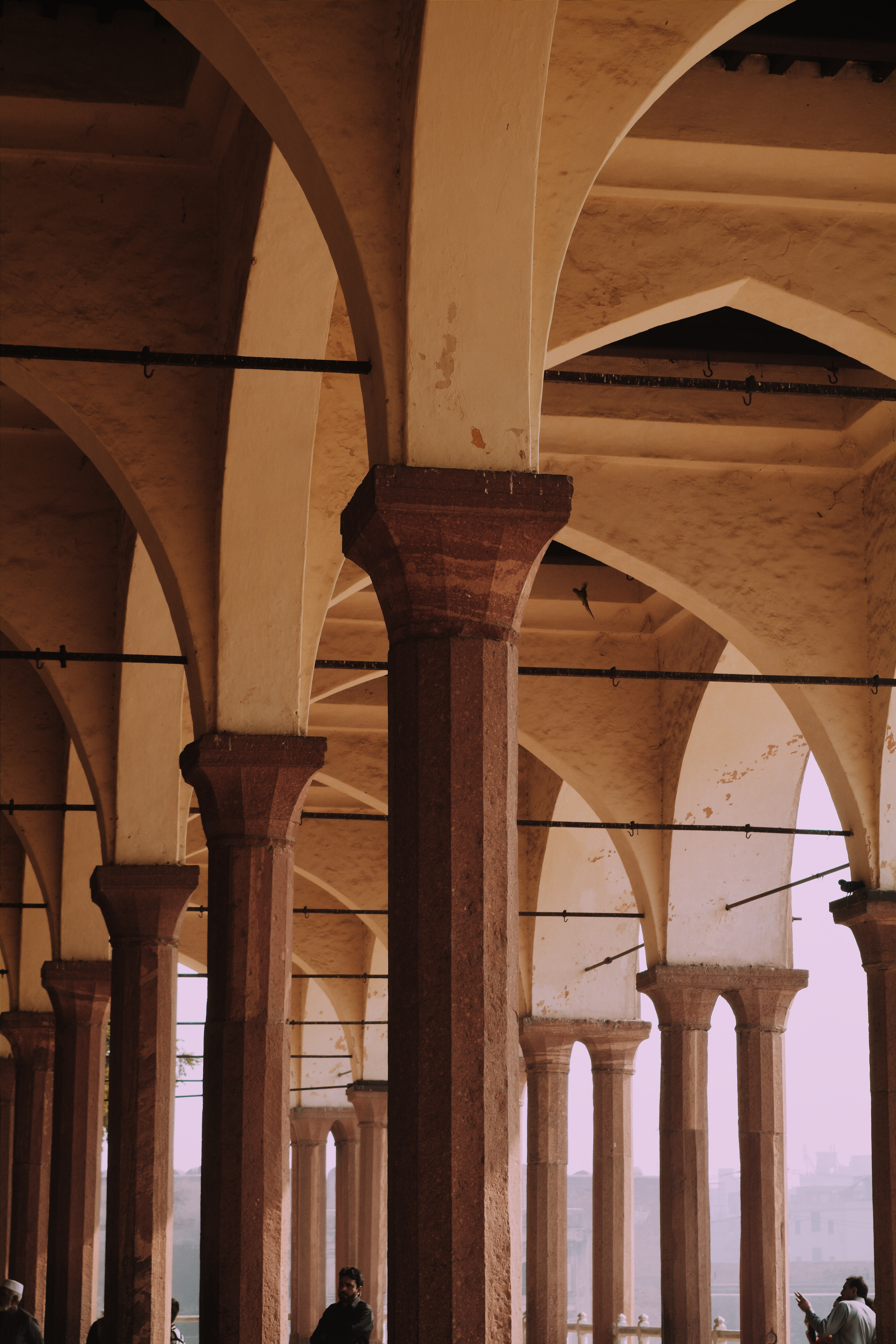
The current Diwan-i-Aam is a reconstruction undertaken during the British era.

The Diwan-i-Aam was built by Shah Jahan in 1628 in a prominent part of the fort immediately south of Jahangir's Quadrangle. It was built style of a Chehel Sotoun - a Persian style 40-pillar public audience hall, in a style similar to the Diwan-i-Aam at the Agra Fort. The Diwan-i-Aam was used as a hall for the emperors to hold an audience with commoners.

Shah Jahan's Diwan-i-Aam was destroyed in 1841 when the son of Maharaja Ranjit Singh, Sher Singh bombarded the fort in his fight against Maharani Chand Kaur, the wife of Maharaja Kharak Singh. The current structure was built by the British in 1849 after their victory against the Sikhs.

==== Kharak Singh Haveli ====
Kharak Singh Haveli was the haveli of Kharak Singh, the heir to Ranjit Singh. It lies in the southeast of the Jahangir's Quadrangle. It was later occupied by the British where the first and the ground floor were used as a Commandant's Quarters and godown and servants house respectively. Currently, it houses the archaeological survey office.

==== The Khwabgah of Jahangir ====
The Jahangir Quadrangle is bordered on its northern edge by Jahangir's sleeping chambers, the Bari Khwabgah, which was largely reconstructed during the British era.

==== Sehdari pavilion ====
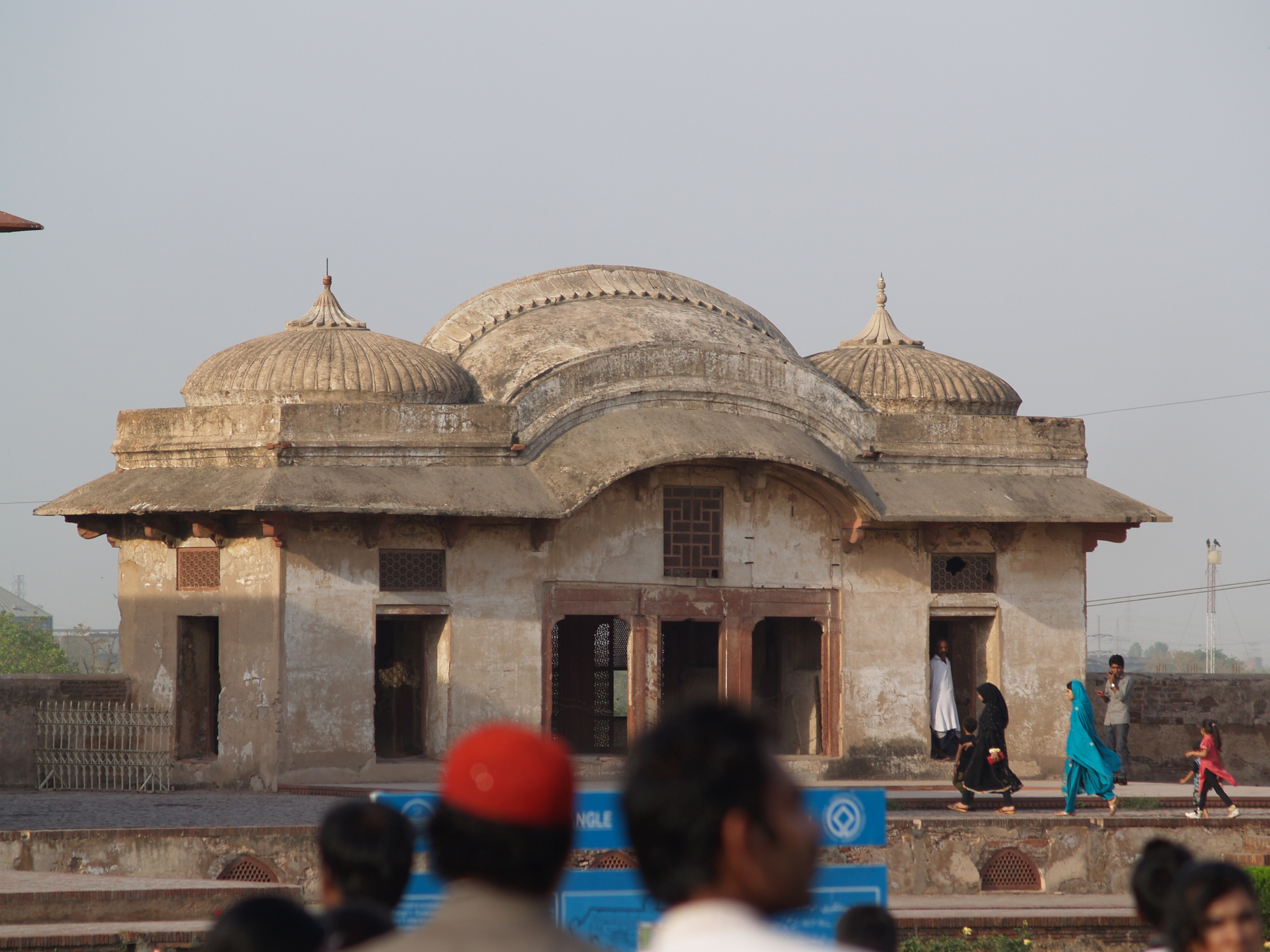
The Sikh-era Sehdari, or "Three-doored pavilion" served as an office for Faqir Syed Noor-ud-din, a trusted Governor of Ranjit Singh.

The Sikh-era Sehdari pavilion, or "Three-doored" pavilion, is located to the east of the Bari Khwabgah. A second Sehdari pavilion was located to the west of the Bari Khwabgah, but was subsequently destroyed during the British period. The surviving pavilion was used as an office for Faqir Syed Noor-ud-din, a trusted Governor of Ranjit Singh. The architectural style of the Sehdari pavilion is typical of the Sikh period. Frescoes decorating the pavilion portray floral designs, birds, and Hindu religious themes.

=== Maktab Khana ===
The Maktab Khana ("Clerk's Quarters") originally known as Dawlat Khana-e-Jahangir, was constructed in 1617 under the supervision of Mamur Khan during the reign of Jahangir as a set of cloisters near the Moti Masjid. Designed by Khawaja Jahan Muhammad Dost, it was used as a passage to the Audience Hall from the palace buildings to the north. Clerks in the Maktab Khana would also record the entry of guests into the fort. It features iwans in the Persian-Timurid style on each of its four sides. Each iwan is flanked by arches.

=== Moti Masjid ===
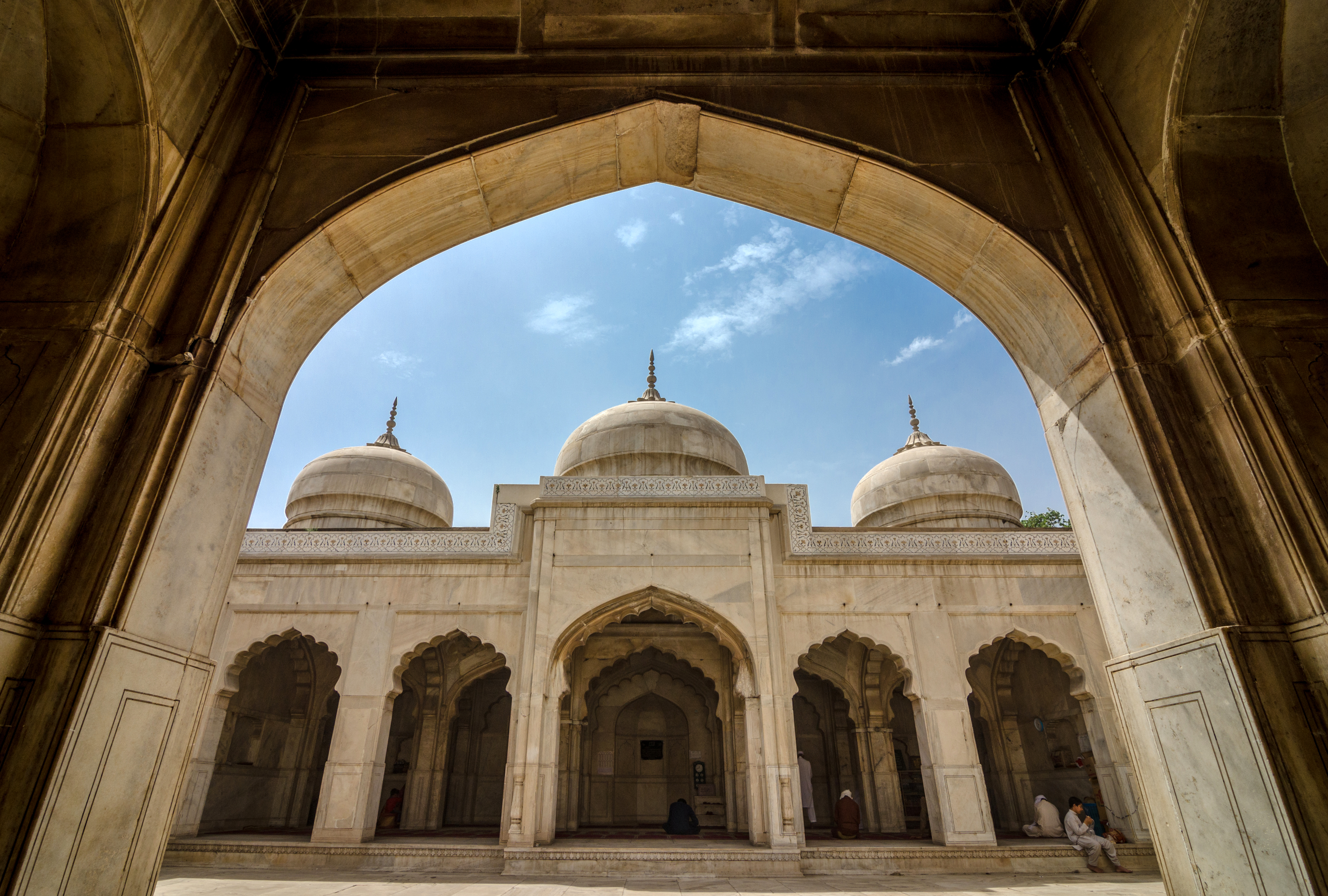
Lahore's Moti Masjid is the earliest of three Mughal "Pearl Mosques." The two others are the one in Agra and the other in Delhi.

The Moti Masjid (Urdu: موتی مسجد), one of the "Pearl Mosques", is a mosque dating from the Shah Jahan Period that is located on the western side of Lahore Fort, closer to Alamgiri Gate. It is situated in the northwestern corner of Dewan-e-Aam. The white marble structure is among its prominent extensions (such as Sheesh Mahal and Naulakha pavilion) to the Lahore Fort Complex. Moti in Urdu language means pearl, which designates a perceived preciousness to the religious structure. It was an established practice among Mughal emperors to name the mosques after generic names for gemstones. The mosque, built between 1630–35, has three superimposed domes, two aisles of five bays, and a slightly raised central pishtaq, or portal with a rectangular frame. This five-arched facade distinguishes it from other mosques of a similar class with three-arched facades. The interior is simple and plain with the exception of ceilings that are decorated and designed in four different orders, two arcuate, and two trabeated.

After the demise of the Mughal Empire, the mosque was converted into a Sikh temple and renamed Moti Mandir during the period of the Sikh rule under Ranjit Singh's Sikh Confederacy. He later used the building for the state treasury. When the East India Company took over Punjab in 1849, they discovered precious stones wrapped in bits of rags and placed in velvet purses scattered inside the mosque, along with other inventory.

=== Gates ===
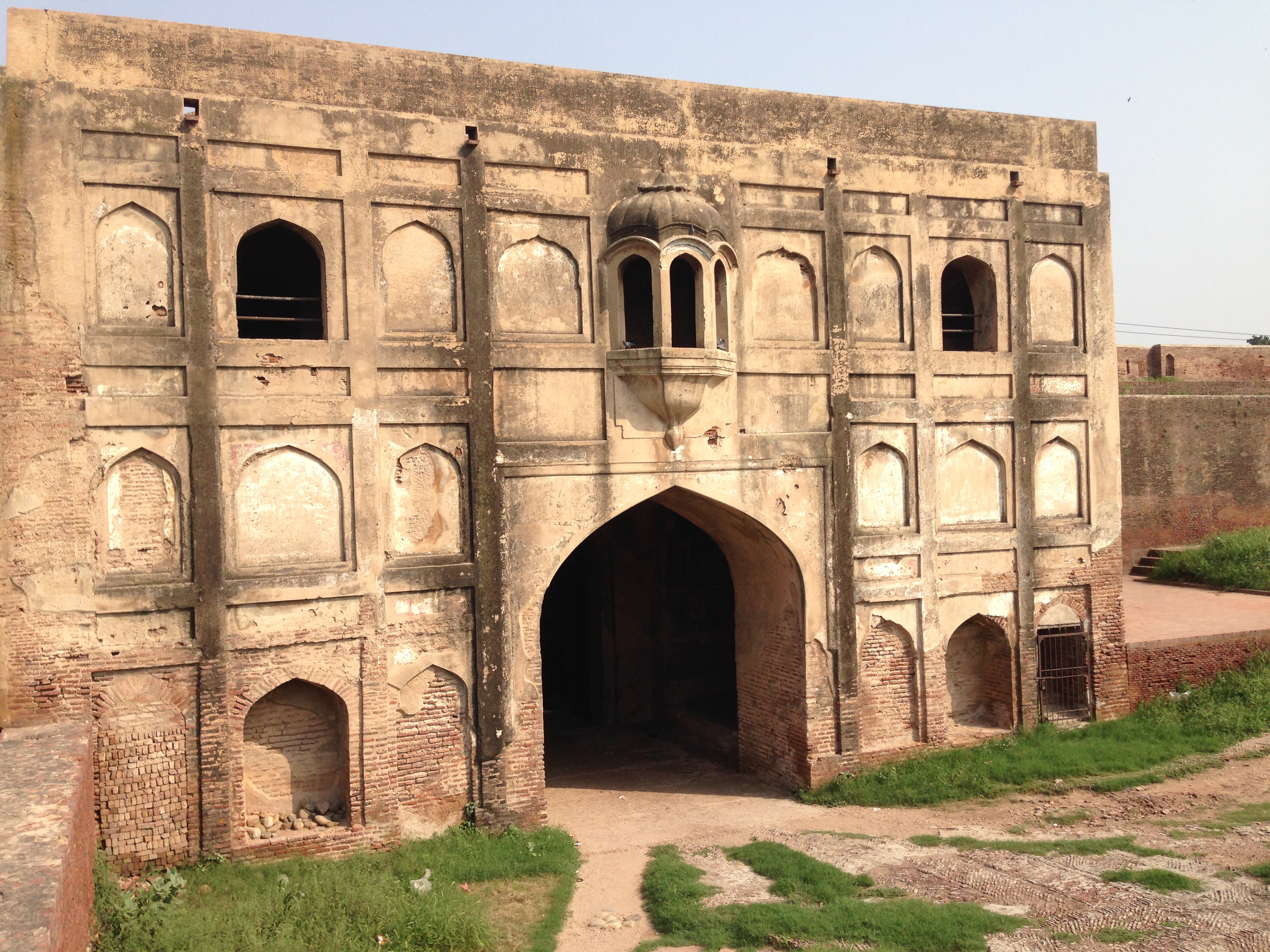
Akbari Gate as seen from within the fort complex.

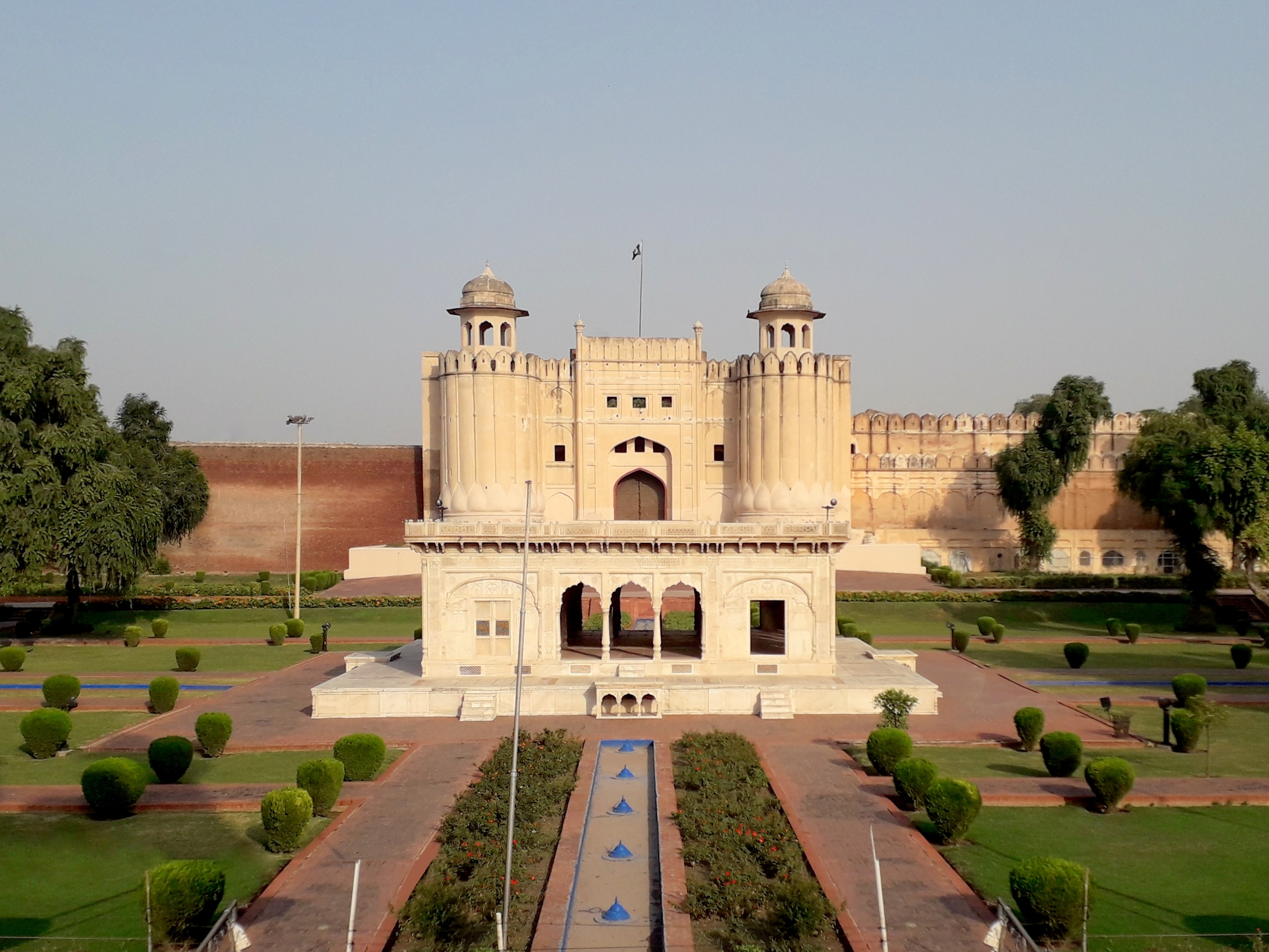
Alamgiri Gate

==== Akbari Gate ====
Mughal Emperor Akbar built two gates. Akbari Gate was built in 1566 and is now called Maseeti Gate.

==== Alamgiri Gate ====
Located at the western end of the fort, the Alamgiri Gate is the entrance of the Lahore Fort. It was built by the Mughal emperor Aurangzeb in 1674. It has two semi-circular bastions where lotus petal design adorns its base. It opens to the Hazuri Bagh and faces the Badshahi Mosque. The gate is one of Lahore's most iconic monuments, and once featured on Pakistani currency.

==== Shah Burj Gate ====
Restoration work was completed in March 2020 by Aga Khan Cultural Service Pakistan with funding from the Royal Norwegian Embassy, the Walled City of Lahore Authority, and the Aga Khan Trust for Culture.

=== Naag Temple ===
The Naag temple is a Sikh temple built by Chand Kaur, the wife of Kharak Singh, daughter in law of the then ruling Maharaja Ranjit Singh. The temple is square in plan and built on a raised platform. Its exterior walls are covered with fresco paintings. The temple also has a water-melon shaped dome. The site is currently closed to the public in order to prevent further deterioration.

=== Mai Jindan Haveli ===
Mai Jindan Haveli is of unknown origins and believed to be a Mughal structure but attributed to the Mai Jindan, Chand Kaur because of the extensive additions by the Sikhs. It is a two-storied building and is presently the site of the Sikh Gallery Museum.

== Conservation ==
In 1980, Government of Pakistan nominated the fort for inclusion in UNESCO World Heritage Site based on the criteria i, ii, and iii together with the Shalimar Gardens. In the fifth meeting session held in Sydney in October 1981, the World Heritage Site committee added both the monuments to the list.

In 2000, Pakistan sent a letter to the organisation to include both the sites in List of World Heritage in Danger and sought help to restore the damaged part of the outer walls and hydraulic works of Shalamar Gardens. In April 2006, it was reported that officials had urged UNESCO to remove the name of the fort from the list of endangered World Heritage Sites because of extensive restoration work funded by Norway, Hong Kong, the United Kingdom and France. Restoration projects included works at the Sheesh Mahal, Alamgiri Gate, and Hazuri Bagh. After years of extensive renovation and restoration work, the fort and Shalimar Gardens were removed from the endangered list in June 2012.

Though in 1990, UNESCO had ordered the Punjab Archaeological Department to bar the use of the Fort for state or private functions on account of historical significance, a wedding reception was held in violation on 23 December 2010. The Antiquities Act of 1975, which prohibits the use of historical places to protect them from damage, was violated in the following month by hosting a dinner in the Diwan-i-Khas.

Conservation works at the Picture Wall began in 2015 by the Aga Khan Trust for Culture and Walled City of Lahore Authority. Documentation of the wall using 3D scanner was completed in July 2016, after which conservation work would start.

In November 2026, the restoration of the Akbari Gate was completed after nearly two centuries of closure. Built during the reign of Mughal emperor Akbar, the eastern entrance historically connected the Walled City of Lahore with the fort. The restoration, carried out by the Punjab Walled Cities and Heritage Areas Authority in collaboration with the French Development Agency and Aga Khan Cultural Service Pakistan, uncovered historic fresco paintings and restored the wooden entrance gate. Following a soft launch in November 2026, the gate was scheduled to reopen to the public in December.

== Governance ==
Under the 2017 Local Government Act of Punjab, Shahi Qila also serves as a union council located in the Ravi Zone.

== See also ==
- List of UNESCO World Heritage Sites in Pakistan
- List of forts in Pakistan
- Red Fort
- Agra Fort

== Sources ==
- Hamadani, Agha Hussain (1986). The Frontier Policy of the Delhi Sultans. Atlantic Publishers. ISBN 9694150035.
- Khan, Muhammad Ishtiaq. Lahore Fort. Department of Archaeology & Museums, Government of Pakistan, 1974.
- Asher, Catherine Blanchard. Architecture of Mughal India. Cambridge University Press. ISBN 9780521267281.
- Chaudhry, Nazir Ahmad (1999). Lahore Fort: A Witness to History. Sang-e-Meel Publications. ISBN 9789693510409.
- Bhalla, A. S. (18 February 2015). Monuments, Power and Poverty in India: From Ashoka to the Raj. I.B.Tauris. ISBN 9781784530877.
- Koch, Ebba (1991). Mughal Architecture: An Outline of Its History and Development, 1526-1858. Prestel. ISBN 3-7913-1070-4.
- Nabi Khan, Ahmed (1997). Studies in Islamic Archaeology of Pakistan. Sang-e-Meel Publications. ISBN 969-35-0717-7.
- Neville, Pran (2006). Lahore : A Sentimental Journey. Penguin Books. ISBN 9780143061977.
