= Ebba Koch =

Austrian art and architectural historian

Ebba Koch is an Austrian art and architectural historian, who defines and discusses cultural issues of interest to political, social and economic historians. Presently she is a professor at the Institute of Art History in Vienna, Austria and a senior researcher at the Austrian Academy of Sciences. She completed her doctorate in philosophy and her Habilitation at Vienna University.

Koch has spent much of her professional life studying the architecture, art, and culture of the Mughal Empire, and is considered the leading authority on Mughal architecture. In 2001 she became the architectural advisor to the Taj Mahal Conservation Collaborative.

== Professional life ==
=== Early Modern India ===
Koch's work has made considerable contributions to the historical understanding of early modern India. In collaboration with the Indian architect Richard A. Barraud she conducted major surveys of the palaces and gardens of Shah Jahan, reconstructed the Mughal city of Agra, and produced the first, comprehensive documentation of the Taj Mahal. Through this work, Koch has developed one of the largest archives of photographs and measured drawings of the Islamic architecture of the Indian subcontinent.

She has also contributed to recording Mughal painting and applied arts, the artistic connections between Europe and Mughal India, and imperial symbolism.

=== Methodology ===
Koch supports establishing art as an historical source, believing that an integrative approach can provide the key to the political and ideological concepts of the historical period being studied. Architecture and art emerge as a means of communication, through a topos of symbols, and like language and literature, they represent vital clues in the study of cultural and political history.

In her work with the Mughal Empire, informed by written sources, she utilises the art historian’s technique of formal analysis: utilising elements of the aesthetics of art, architectural form, building type, garden and urban design to form an understanding of the period. This approach has uncovered aspects of Mughal culture which were never recorded, but expressed only in architecture and the arts.

== Honours ==
Research grants for major surveys of Mughal architecture in the Indian Subcontinent:

- Jubiläumsfonds der Österreichischen Nationalbank: 1982, 1994, 1997, 1999
- Fonds zur Förderung der wissenschaftlichen Forschung: 1982, 1984, 1987, 1989
- des Bundesministeriums für Wissenschaft und Forschung: 1992
- des Bundesministeriums für Unterricht und kulturelle Angelegenheiten: 1997.
- 1998: Hagop Kevorkian Lectureship in Near Eastern Art and Civilization, New York University.
- 1998: Distinguished Visiting Professor of the Department of Arabic Studies of the School of Humanities and Social Sciences at the American University in Cairo.
- 2002: Fellowship of the Aga Khan Program for the Study of Islamic Architecture at Harvard University.
- 2005–2009 Austrian delegate to the Management Committee of the COST Action A36 of the European Commission, "Network of Comparative Empires : Tributary Empires Compared : Romans, Mughals and Ottomans in the Pre-Industrial World from Antiquity till the Transition to Modernity".
- 2008: Visiting Professor, Khalili Centre, Faculty of Oriental Studies, Oxford University
- 2008–09: Visiting Professor (fall term), Department of History of Art and Architecture, Harvard University
- 2009-2012: FWF Austrian Science Funds, project "Mughal palaces"

== Selected publications ==
- Shah Jahan and Orpheus: The Pietre Dure Decoration and the Programme of the Throne in the Hall of Public Audiences at the Red Fort of Delhi, Graz, Akademische Druck- und Verlagsanstalt, 1988
- Dara Shikoh Shooting Nilgai: Hunt and Landscape in Mughal Painting., Freer Occasional Paper, New Series 1. Washington D. C.: Freer Gallery of Art and Arthur M. Sackler Gallery, Smithsonian Institution. 1998.
- Mughal Architecture: An Outline if Its History and Development, München: Prestel, 1991; 2nd ed. New Delhi: Oxford University Press, 2002.
- with Milo C. Beach and Wheeler Thackston, King of the World: The Padshahnama, an Imperial Mughal Manuscript from the Royal Library, Windsor Castle, London: Azimuth Editions und Washington DC: Sackler Gallery, Smithsonian Institution 1997
- Mughal Art and Imperial Ideology, New Delhi: Oxford University Press 2001.
- The Complete Taj Mahal and the Riverfront Gardens of Agra, London: Thames and Hudson 2006.
- The Planetary King: Humayun Padshah: Inventor and Visionary on the Mughal Throne, Ahmedabad: Mapin and Aga Khan Trust for Culture 2022

Prof. Koch has published numerous papers in journals and collectaneous volumes on Indian and Islamic architecture and painting and she has contributed several articles to the Encyclopedia of Islam.
