= USS Akbar =

Patrol vessel of the United States Navy

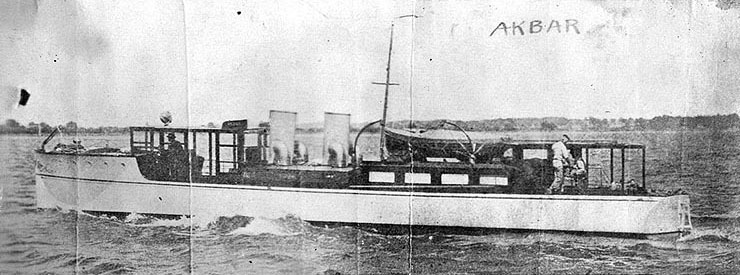
- Akbar underway before her U.S. Navy service in World War I

History

United States
- Name: USS Akbar (SP-599)
- Namesake: Jalul-ud-Din Muhammed (Akbar the Great)
- Builder: Mathis Yacht Building Company; Camden, New Jersey
- Completed: 1915
- Acquired: 17 May 1917
- Commissioned: 31 May 1917
- Decommissioned: 17 January 1919
- Stricken: 2 October 1919
- Fate: Sold, 2 January 1920; ultimate fate unknown

General characteristics
- Type: Section patrol vessel
- Displacement: 125 t
- Length: 72 ft 6 in (22.10 m)
- Beam: 11 ft 6 in (3.51 m)
- Draft: 3 ft 4 in (1.02 m)
- Speed: 22 knots (41 km/h)
- Complement: 11
- Armament: 2 × machine guns

USS Akbar (SP-599) was first owned by George W. Childs Drexel of Philadelphia, a member of the city's Corinthian Yacht Club. The original name Akbar, apparently named for Mogul emperor Jalul-ud-Din Muhammed, known as "Akbar" (The Great), was retained upon entry into naval service.

== Private ownership ==
Akbar, described as an "express cruiser," was built in 1915 by the Mathis Yacht Building Company of Camden, New Jersey to a design by Bowes and Mower as hull number 49 assigned official number 213334, signal letters LFKP and 25 GRT on registration. The cruiser was powered by two Harbeck Loew - Victors six cylinder, 190 horsepower gasoline engines. The engines were T head with 7.5 X 8.5 inch cylinders and two separate ignition systems. Fuel was in two tanks, one under the forward cockpit and another under the aft with 600 gallons total capacity. Two funnels were functional with the after funnel with mufflers for engine exhaust and crankcase exhaust was through the forward funnel. Four air scoops ventilated the engine room amidships. The hull was double planked; a steam bent frame with an outer skin of mahogany with a flared bow and an external rudder aft. The superstructure was of mahogany.

The owner's stateroom with toilet was forward, entered by a half spiral stair from the bridge, with two berths and storage. The bridge and forward cockpit were glassed with the glass easily removed when weather conditions made that desirable. Amidships was the engine room with an easily removed top for access to the engines for repair or replacement. No overnight crew was normal, but pipe berths were available if necessary. Immediately aft of the engine room was a port side galley and a starboard side toilet with access from the main saloon which had transom seating, lockers, buffet and a folding table. The tender was normally stored on the saloon's top. The aft cockpit was glassed with a forward windshield but fully open aft.

The cruiser was for the owner's use at his summer home at Islesboro, Maine and was used for several trips between Philadelphia and Islesboro.

== Military career ==
The State of Maine purchased the yacht from her owner, George W. C. Drexel of Philadelphia, and then lent her the section commander at Bath, Maine. The U.S. Navy purchased the craft on 17 May 1917 and placed her in commission on 31 May 1917.

After commissioning, the boat was assigned to the 1st Naval District. Akbar carried out harbor patrol duty in the Rockland, Maine, section until May 1918 when she was shifted to the Portland, Maine, section. The former yacht served on patrol duty in that area through the end of World War I in November 1918.

Akbar was decommissioned on 17 January 1919. Her name was struck from the Navy list on 2 October 1919, and she was sold on 2 January 1920 to F. Chester Everett of Maiden, Massachusetts.
