= Pagal Panthis =

18th-19th century socio-religious order founded by Karam Shah

The Pagal Panthis (lit. 'followers of the mad path') were a socio-religious order that emerged in the late 18th-century in the Mymensingh region of Bengal (now located in Bangladesh). Karam Shah (1710–1813 AD) a Sufi saint was the founder of that order. Adherents of a syncretic mixture of Hinduism, Sufism and Animism, the order sought to uphold religious principles and the rights of landless peasants in Bengal; under the leadership of Karam Shah's son Tipu Shah, the movement soon evolved into a popular, armed struggle against the British East India Company and the zamindar (landlord) system. It was crushed with the help of the army in 1833. It was a semi religious sect having influence in the northern districts of Bengal. Pagal panthi was the movement of Hodi, Garo and Hajong tribes. It was led by the Hodi leader Janku Pathar and Debraj Pathar.

Karam Shah's father was Ser Ali Ghazi who was a zamindar of Sherpur pargana. Around 1588 (994 Bangabd/Bengali calendar) was expelled from the zamindari for the crime of killing Kanungo Ramavallab Nandi of East Kacharibari Darsha village of Sherpur. At that time, however, the name of Serpur was Dasakahaniya. Later, Ali Ghazi was killed in the conspiracy of Hindu landlords. Karim shah lived with his mother for some days in a helpless condition. Later he started living at Shankarpur in Susanga Pargana. He was a follower of Sufism. Many historians have called him a reformer of religion and a seer of the future. In 1775 AD, Karam Shah shifted his residence to Letirkanda in present-day Purbadhala Upazila in Mymensingh Division. From the same year, Karam Shah began to initiate the tribals of the Garo hill region into the egalitarian paranoia doctrine. From 1786 Fakir Sannyasi was involved in the revolt and formed a zamindar and anti-British movement in Sherpur Pargana.

Karam Shah's pre-ascetic name was Chand Ghazi. After getting involved in the zamindar and anti-British movement, he made himself known as Karam Shah. Somewhere he was also called Karim Shah. He died in 1813 AD at his native Letirkanda. He was buried in the yard of his house.

== History ==
The Pagal Panthis were a sect that emerged in the northern Mymensingh and Sherpur District area of the province of Bengal. In contrast to the rest of Bengal region was inhabited mainly by tribal peoples such as the Garos, Hajongs, Dalus, Hodis and Rajbongshies, who were mainly adherents of animism and tribal beliefs. Diverse faiths were tolerated in the region. The Pagal Panthis were founded by Karim Shah and other disciples of the Muslim fakir Majnu Shah, the leader of the Madariya Sufi order. After the death of Karim Shah in 1813, the order was led by his son Tipu Shah. Chandi Bibi, the wife of Karim Shah and Tipu Shah's mother also held an influential position in the community, known as Pir-Mata (Saint-Mother).

== Philosophy ==
The philosophy and teachings of Karim Shah were a syncretism of Sufism, Hindu philosophy and local customs, traditions and beliefs. The religious order gained popularity amongst the native peoples and brought together a diverse collection of tribes, Muslims, Hindus and animists. The order preached monotheism, human equality, non-violence and encouraged the people to overcome social and religious differences and avoid conflicts and dogma. Karim Shah and his followers addressed each other as "Bhaisaheb" (brother) to promote equality and brotherhood. Karim Shah himself was popularly believed to possess spiritual powers enabling him to foretell events, cure diseases and heal people. He propagated the communist ideology(The egalitarian ideology refers to the equality of all human beings.) and said - All people are God's creation, no one is subordinate to anyone. Thus the distinction between high and low is inconsistent. This order, which followed a fusion of Hinduism, Sufism and Animism, tried to uphold religious principles and the rights of the landless peasants in Bengal.

He came to Susanga Pargana in 1775 and initiated the Garos and Hajongs into the egalitarian religion. In fact, in 1802 this egalitarian and truth-seeking community of Garos and Hajongs was first referred to as "fanatics" by the English Collector of Mymensingh. The ideologies of the fanatics combined the non-violent elements of all religions and were compatible with the traditional religion of the peasants. Karim Shah was deeply religious and people believed that he possessed spiritual powers. He could prophesy and according to followers, he had the power to cure diseases and improve their fortunes. A large number of people were hoping for his company. They stayed with him in a commune and were engaged in his service in various ways . There were separate living arrangements for followers from different clans and groups.

The movement was shunned and criticised by Bengali Muslim society and its leaders, who condemned religious syncretism and referred to the order as Pagal Panthis – literally the followers of a "mad faith." However, the order gained widespread popularity amongst peasant masses. Under Tipu Shah, the order extended its philosophy to demand equal socio-economic rights for the peasants of the region. Tipu Shah proclaimed that no unilateral ownership of land could be allowed, as God had created humans as equals, thus granting every human an equal right to the lands. Those who forced peasants to pay taxes and oppressed them lost the moral right to rule over others. Ruling in the name of Allah, Tipu Shah enforced religious laws and encouraged tax resistance.

== Peasant rebellions ==
The patron-saint of the Pagal Panthis, Majnu Shah, had been famous for encouraging revolts against the British East India Company, which had gained control over Bengal and later much of India. Under Tipu Shah, the order focused on organising peasants in rebellions against oppressive taxes and laws imposed by the zamindars (landlords) and the British.

The region had been devastated by war between British forces and Burma. To meet the costs of war, severe taxation was imposed on the region's peasants by the Company and the landlords. Forcible collections and usurpation of property increased peasant discontent and disorder. The Pagal Panthis sought to protect and defend peasants from the militias of the landlords and the Company's armed forces. Basing his forces in a mud-fort near Sherpur, Tipu Shah proclaimed his rule in the name of Allah and assumed the religious and political leadership of the community. The people of the region stopped paying taxes to the British and followed Tipu Shah's rulings. Although Tipu Shah and his aides were arrested in 1833 and tried, the government subsequently met many of the peasant demands, including lowering the rent rate and other taxes. Compromises and agreements between the landlords, the Company and the peasants helped restore peace and order in the northern Mymensingh region.

After Tipu Shah's death in 1852, the order came under the leadership of Janku and Dobraj Pathor, who organised another peasant resistance movement against the landlords and British authorities. An armed group of Pagal Panthis under the leadership of the Pathors (the Hodi leaders or headman) stormed into Sherpur town, looted government offices and overpowered the officials, landlords and police, forcing them to flee to Mymensingh. Declaring themselves rulers of the town and surrounding areas, the rebels held control for almost two years. Negotiations and compromises between the rebels and the British helped forge peace and further concessions to the cause of the peasants.
