= Government of the Mughal Empire =

Administrative system of the Mughal Empire

- Flag and Seal of the Mughal Empire

Overview
- Established: 21 April 1526
- Dissolved: 21 September 1857
- State: Mughal Empire
- Leader: Mughal emperor
- Main organ: Durbar
- Ministries: Vakil / Grand vizier Diwan (finance and revenue); Mir Bakhshi (military); Sadr-us-sudur (law and religious patronage); Khan-i-saman (imperial household and public works)
- Headquarters: Agra; Fatehpur Sikri (1571-1585); Lahore (1585-1598); Shahjahanabad / Delhi (from 1648); Aurangabad (1681-1707)

The government of the Mughal Empire was the administrative system through which the Mughal Empire ruled the Indian subcontinent from 1526 until 1857. Its foundations were Central Asian: the dynasty carried into India the layered Perso-Islamic and Turko-Mongol traditions of the Timurid world, and grafted them onto structures inherited from the Delhi Sultanate and sharpened by Sher Shah Suri. Nearly all of its classic institutions took shape under the third emperor, Akbar (r. 1556–1605), whose reforms of the 1570s and 1580s created an apparatus that survived with little structural change into the early eighteenth century.

At its head stood the emperor (padshah), whose sovereignty fused Timurid descent, Perso-Islamic kingship, and, from Akbar onwards, millennial and saintly claims enacted through court ritual, public appearance (darshan), and the enrolment of nobles as royal disciples. Beneath him executive power was deliberately divided among four great ministers: the diwan for finance, the mir bakhshi for the military, the sadr-us-sudur for religion and law, and the khan-i-saman for the imperial household. The whole imperial service was organised through the mansabdari system, a graded hierarchy of dual numerical ranks (zat and sawar) that fixed each officer's dignity, pay, and cavalry obligation, and consumed roughly four-fifths of the empire's assessed revenue. Succession was never fixed: princes competed openly for the throne (takht ya takhta, "throne or coffin"), a system that recent scholarship reads as one of the empire's integrative engines rather than a simple flaw.

The empire's revenue rested on a heavy land tax assessed by several methods, of which the cash-rate zabt schedules perfected under Todar Mal became the hallmark, and was paid out mainly through transferable jagir assignments rather than cash salaries. Territorially the empire was divided into subahs (provinces), then sarkars and parganas, each level staffed by paired executive and fiscal officers who checked one another, with the hereditary zamindars beneath and beside the formal hierarchy. A corps of news-writers and an imperial post (dak chauki) kept the centre informed; Hanafi qazi courts, the emperor's own justice, and a plural documentary culture carried the law; and the whole government travelled, from capital to capital and into the vast tent-city of the imperial camp.

The system broke down over the half-century after Aurangzeb's death in 1707, as the shortage of assignable revenue, factional politics, and the rise of autonomous governors dissolved central control, though the dynasty's legitimacy proved durable enough for the rebellion of 1857 to rally around the last emperor. Historians have debated the system's nature ever since: the Aligarh school described a centralised, quasi-modern bureaucracy; Stephen P. Blake a "patrimonial-bureaucratic" household state; and later revisionists a negotiated order sustained as much by locality and ritual as by extraction.

== Origins and development ==
Little in Mughal government was new in conception. The dynasty carried into India the administrative compound of the Timurid world: R. P. Tripathi traced the office of the wazir from the Abbasid caliphate, whose jurists made the minister the deputy (nayab) of the sovereign, through the divided, functionally specialised wazirs contemplated in Timur's ordinances, whose ariz, diwan, and mushrif all have recognisable Mughal counterparts. Babur ruled his Indian conquests (1526–30) essentially as a Timurid warlord, and his son Humayun is remembered less for institutions than for the mystical scheme, twelve orders and a zodiac tent, through which he expressed his conception of sovereignty.

The working foundations were laid partly by the empire's supplanter. Sher Shah Suri (r. 1540–45) fixed the revenue demand in Hindustan and enforced measurement (jarib) where earlier practice had allowed the choice of crop-sharing, and his silver and copper coinage set the standards the restored Mughals kept: in 1556 Bairam Khan struck the young Akbar's first coins in the Sur types and continued the Sur monetary system.

It was Akbar's reign (1556–1605) that assembled the classic structure. The regulation revenue system grew through experiment: the karori reform of the nineteenth regnal year sought to extend measured assessment as widely as possible, Todar Mal's settlement of 1580 gave it its mature form, and by the time the A'in-i Akbari was compiled the zabt covered, for example, three-quarters of the assessed revenue of Bihar. The practice of frequent jagir transfer was decisively established when Akbar dislodged the entrenched Atka clan from the Punjab in his thirteenth regnal year. In the vizarat, Akbar separated financial from political and military power, creating a finance minister more dignified than the "second-class wazir" of the Muslim jurists but no longer an alter ego of the king. The structures created by Akbar's administration then survived, in John F. Richards's judgement, "with surprisingly little change" into the early years of the eighteenth century.

== Imperial authority and central government ==
=== The emperor ===
The Mughal emperor (padshah) stood at the apex of the political, military, and symbolic order, and the dynasty's claim to rule rested on a layered inheritance. The first layer was Timurid: Babur's title to rule rested on his descent from Timur, whose sack of Delhi in 1398 had carried the family's prestige into India, and no earlier Muslim dynasty of South Asia commanded comparable standing. The second was Perso-Islamic and Turko-Mongol: the central government continued the compound of traditions that had existed in Timurid Central Asia, adapted to Indian conditions. A. Azfar Moin has argued that a third, millennial layer mattered as much as either: Akbar's sacred sovereignty was enacted in the style of Timur the "Lord of Conjunction" (sahib-qiran), drawing on conjunction astrology and messianic myth to combine royal and saintly authority in one person.

Akbar gave these claims institutional teeth. The declaration (mahzar) of 1579 set the emperor above the empire's scholars and jurists: when they split over a question of religious law, the choice among their opinions now lay with the ruler, and his choice bound every Muslim. The abolition of the jizya in 1579 flowed from the same logic of superseding the normal practice of Muslim kings, and drew hostile notice from the rival Ottoman court. From the early 1580s Akbar also enlisted selected nobles as personal disciples (murids), raising each up with a new turban, a sun medallion, and a miniature portrait of the emperor to wear; the discipleship idiom persisted into Jahangir's reign, when a Sufi master could be rebuked for poaching a nobleman who was "already the disciple of the emperor".

Ritual made the hierarchy visible daily. The emperor showed himself to the public at dawn (darshan) from a palace balcony, an obligation so fixed that only unavoidable circumstances could excuse absence before the assembled public and nobles. Court etiquette graded every gesture: Akbar revived the old prostration (sijda) in the softened form of zaminbos (kissing the ground), which Shah Jahan finally abolished for its resemblance to prayer, fixing four taslim salutes as the rule instead. The court's language of favour ran through objects: the robe of honour (khilat), given daily at court and manufactured in a palace workshop, transferred a share of imperial glory to its recipient, most powerfully when taken from the emperor's own wardrobe, while the nazr (offering from inferior to superior) acknowledged the same hierarchy in reverse. Harbans Mukhia has stressed how this ritual grammar reached beyond the court: obeisance was due to any emblem of the emperor's person, his farman, food from his table, even his slippers.

=== The four ministries ===
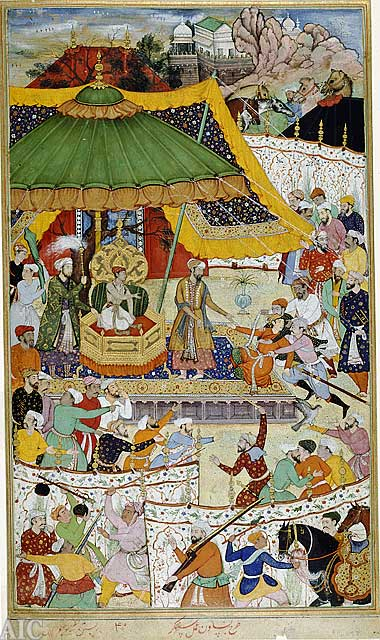
The court of Akbar, from the Akbarnama. The imperial court (darbar) was the central institution through which the Mughal state transmitted authority, made appointments and heard petitions.

The Mughals inherited from their Timurid and Delhi Sultanate predecessors the model of an all-powerful vakil or wazir standing between king and administration, and the early decades of the empire followed it: Bairam Khan governed the empire as vakil during Akbar's minority. Akbar's mature system broke deliberately with that inheritance. Ibn Hasan, in the standard study of the central structure, described how Akbar "departed from precedent" and solved the problem of delegation through an organisation designed so that no minister could again engross the whole executive. After the 1560s the vikalat survived as the empire's highest dignity, and its holder ranked as the first man of the state, but it was "shorn of its power": when Muzaffar Khan, one of the last working vakils, was transferred to Bengal in the twenty-fourth regnal year, his connexion with the central administration simply ended.

Executive responsibility settled instead on four great offices, each checking the others:

- The diwan (in full diwan-i kul, chief diwan) headed the revenue and finance ministry (vizarat), supervising assessment, collection, the khalisa and jagir offices, and the disbursement of salaries. Every fiscal order of consequence carried his seal, and the authentication of true copies of nearly all official documents ran through his office. Todar Mal, who served Akbar in this capacity, became the archetype of the office.
- The mir bakhshi (chief bakhshi) headed the military department. All orders of appointment to mansabs of whatever rank, and even to the great offices of vikalat, vizarat, and sadarat, passed through his office for preparation and verification at the ta'liqa (memorandum) stage, so that his influence reached every department of the central government; on completed orders his seal stood side by side with that of the diwan.
- The sadr-us-sudur was the fourth minister, the head of the religious and judicial establishment: he recommended qazis (judges) and mir adls for appointment, and administered the madad-i ma'ash grants. His formerly immense power over the empire's Muslim establishment was deliberately shaken by Akbar, whose inquiries into the land-grant registers in the 1570s stripped the office of its discretion; under Shaikh Abdul Nabi the sadr had been able to "award as much as he liked", and after the reform he could not.
- The mir saman (or khan-i saman) was the high steward of the imperial household, controlling the palace establishments, stores, and the imperial workshops (karkhanas). The office grew out of the diwan-i buyutat, which under Akbar managed the karkhanas and which later became the mir saman's subordinate accounting office; by Shah Jahan's reign the mir saman corresponded with the chief vizarat directly.

Ibn Hasan emphasised that the "system of balancing power did not stop with its division" among the four ministries: within each department, subordinate officers held independent responsibilities and counter-signatures that checked their own superiors.

=== The imperial secretariat ===
The paperwork of empire followed fixed forms. An order conferring a jagir began as a sarkhat (memorandum) approved by the emperor; the diwan then had the draft prepared and entered, and the document collected in sequence the mark of the records office (daftar) and the seals of the diwan, the bakhshi, and the departmental accountant. A full imperial order (farman) passed through the auditor (mustaufi), the revision officer (nazir), the bakhshis, and the diwan before reaching the vakil for the highest seal; a farman so authenticated was called farman-i sabti. Urgent or confidential orders could bypass the whole chain and issue under the imperial seal alone, folded and knotted shut, as a farman-i bayazi. Routine payments, such as the stipends of the princesses and the grants of the ecclesiastical department (diwan-i sa'adat), ran on standing authority without the royal seal at all.

A central auditing establishment closed the loop. The mustaufi audited the accounts of the karkhanas and departments, verifying expenditure against vouchers and demanding the daily entry books and cash abstracts from every branch treasurer (tahvildar) and accountant (mushrif) before certifying the statement to the minister's seal. The emperor's own inspection was built into the machine: the mir saman and his diwan appeared in the darbar daily like other heads of departments, financial statements came to the emperor every six months, and large schemes and estimates needed his sanction in open court.

=== Succession and princely households ===
The Mughals never institutionalised primogeniture. An unspoken rule, drawn from Islamic inheritance norms and Turco-Mongol tradition, gave each son an identical claim on the father's patrimony, and the result was an open-ended system in which princes competed for the throne. Akbar narrowed the field, restricting the contest to the emperor's lineal heirs and, after the 1580s, discontinuing the old princely appanages, so that princes had to build their fortunes through households, alliances, and imperial postings rather than through territorial blocs. Unlike the Ottomans and Safavids, who curtailed princely competition from the end of the sixteenth century, the Mughals kept the contest alive.

Munis Faruqui's study of the princes argues that this apparent dysfunction was politically productive. Princes raised in the certainty of a future struggle built networks of clients across the empire, and the work of financing their households drew them into governing contact with the empire's regional and ethnic groups; each succession crisis, fearful as it was, refocused loyalties on the dynasty and confirmed the winner's grip. The phrase takht ya takhta ("throne or coffin") captured the stakes. The system decayed in Aurangzeb's later years: the rebellion of his son Akbar with Rajput allies in 1681 marked the high-water mark of princely power, and the emperor's response, including the arrest of his eldest surviving son Mu'azzam and Mu'azzam's four sons in 1687, broke the circulation of princely patronage on which the older pattern had rested.

== Mansabdari and the nobility ==
=== The mansabdari system ===
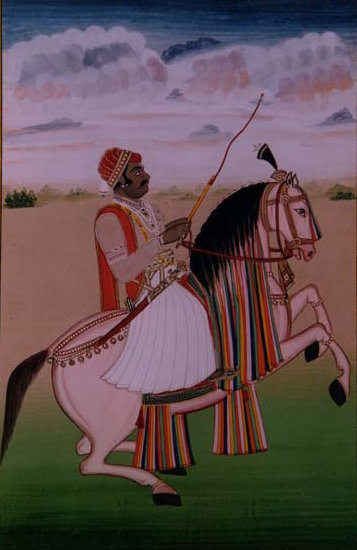
Raja Man Singh I of Amber, a mansabdar of 7,000 under Akbar and one of the most senior Rajput nobles at the imperial court.

Every officer of the Mughal state held a mansab, a numerical rank that fixed at once his place in the hierarchy, his pay, and his military obligation. The system's reach was total: civil officers of every grade were chosen from the holders of military rank, so that, in Abdul Aziz's phrase, the mansabdari system was "the army, the peerage and the civil administration all rolled into one". A mansab could even be conferred simply as a salary grade on men whose service was purely professional, a court physician or a poet.

From Akbar's later years the rank was dual. The zat ("personal") number fixed the holder's dignity and personal pay, on a scale that rose steeply and not proportionately from rank to rank; the sawar ("trooper") number fixed the cavalry contingent he was paid to maintain, at a standard rate of 8,000 dams per sawar per year for a full-obligation rank. What the two numbers originally denoted became a minor historiographical battlefield, fought over by William Irvine, W. H. Moreland, Abdul Aziz, and others; the essentials of the mature system, however, are not in doubt. Ranks could carry a conditional (mashrut) increment attached to a particular post, lapsing with the posting. Jahangir's reign added a further refinement, the du-aspa sih-aspa ("two-three horse") grade, under which the designated portion of an officer's sawar rank carried double pay and double obligation: a commander of 4,000 sawar of whom 1,000 were du-aspa sih-aspa was in effect paid for 5,000 troopers.

The paper entitlements were then cut down systematically. Under the "rule of months" a jagir calculated to yield only five or seven twelfths of the officer's claim put him on a "five-monthly" or "seven-monthly" scale; only princes of the blood and a handful of grandees drew pay on the full twelve-month scale. Cash-paid (naqdi) officers mustered their contingents under a "rule of one-fifth" of the nominal sawar number, a schedule fixed in Shah Jahan's regulations (dastur al-amal) and continued unaltered by Aurangzeb. Where collections fell short of the assessment, a formal abatement (takhfif-i jama) adjusted the account.

The fiscal weight of the corps was enormous. The reconstructed imperial budget for 1595–96 shows that the salary bill of the mansabdars, personal pay, animal allowances, and sawar payments together, absorbed about 3,238 million of an effective assessed revenue (jama) of 3,960 million dams, roughly four-fifths of the empire's income; the top seventy-three officers alone accounted for over a third of the whole.

=== Muster and verification ===
The state's defence against paper armies was the muster. Every trooper's horse was branded (dagh) with the imperial mark, and an elaborate descriptive roll (chehra), classifying horses into fifty-eight divisions by colour and points, was drawn up for each contingent; at inspection the darogha compared the animals presented against the roll, certified those fit for service, and signed the record with the date. The gap between recorded and actual strength nevertheless remained a standing complaint of the eighteenth-century sources, which distinguished men "actually present, not merely on paper".

=== Composition of the nobility ===
The corps of mansabdars grew continuously. Athar Ali's tabulation of the higher nobility shows a great increase in every grade between the fortieth year of Akbar and the thirtieth of Shah Jahan, and again under Aurangzeb, whose second-period lists carry 575 officers of 1,000 zat and above. Recruitment was deliberately cosmopolitan. W. H. Moreland put the share of foreign-origin families among the A'in-i Akbari's nobles of known origin at nearly seventy per cent, and under Aurangzeb roughly half of the higher mansabdars were still foreign-born or of foreign origin, classified in the Persian sources as Irani and Turani, beside Afghans, Indian-born Muslims (shaikhzadas), Rajputs, and Marathas.

Within this mix the dynasty cultivated an ethos of hereditary service: the khanazads, the "house-born" sons of imperial servants, made up 44 to 47 per cent of the higher nobility under Aurangzeb, and memoirists such as the Mughal officer Bhimsen presented the ideal of familial devotion to the empire as the system's moral core. Akbar's recruitment of Hindu Rajput chiefs, sealed by marriage alliances with the imperial house, brought the leading warrior lineages of North India inside the elite. Aurangzeb, after first trying to reduce the number of Hindu nobles, reversed course in the Deccan wars and admitted Marathas wholesale to secure their submission: from thirteen Maratha mansabdars (2.9 per cent) under Shah Jahan, the count rose to ninety-six (16.7 per cent) in 1679–1707. The parallel growth of Afghan nobles, many never admitted to imperial service and maintaining private armies, weakened the internal cohesion of the corps in the empire's last decades.

Nobles were paid through transferable jagirs, deliberately rotated so that no officer struck local roots; the exception was the watan-jagir, the home territory of a zamindar chief admitted into the service, which remained hereditary in his line.

== Revenue administration ==
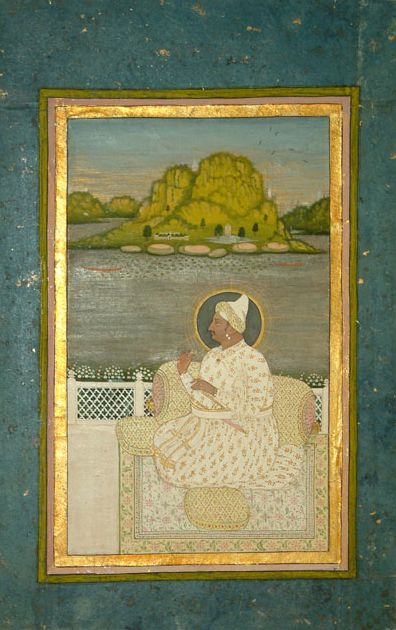
Raja Todar Mal, Akbar's diwan and the architect of the zabt and dahsala land-revenue settlements of the 1580s.

Land revenue, called mal or kharaj, was the mainstay of imperial finance; its alienation from the peasant was, in Irfan Habib's words, "the central feature of the agrarian system of Mughal India". The demand was heavy. Officially the state's share under Akbar's regulation system was set at rates that older writers equated with one-third of the produce, but Habib has shown that the working rates frequently rose above one-third and, in some provinces, approached or exceeded one-half. Assessment was made separately for the two great harvests of the agricultural year, the kharif (autumn) and the rabi (spring).

=== Assessment systems ===
The empire never imposed a single method of assessment. The oldest was crop-sharing (batai or ghalla-bakhshi), of which the revenue literature distinguished three forms: division of the grain after threshing, division of the field while the crop stood, and division of the cut crop in stacks. Crop-sharing gave the state a share of the real harvest but was expensive to administer; Aurangzeb observed that its introduction in the Deccan doubled the costs of collection because watchmen had to be posted over the crops. A second method, kankut (or dana-bandi), proceeded in two stages: the land was first measured, by rope (jarib) or by pacing, and the standing crop's yield per unit of area was then estimated, the estimate being commuted into a cash demand through a schedule of prices.

The most sophisticated method, and the one that became identified with Mughal administration, was zabt: a schedule of standard cash rates (dastur) fixed per bigha for each crop. Its mature form emerged from the reforms of Akbar's finance minister Todar Mal. In 1580 Todar Mal resumed the jagirs of North India into direct treasury management, grouped contiguous parganas into revenue circles, and had officials compile detailed tables of measured area, yields, and prices, from which a standard assessment for each crop in each circle was calculated. The resulting schedules, based on ten-year averages (dahsala), converted the fluctuating harvest into a predictable cash demand; the calculation of the jama-i dahsala (decennial assessment) is described in the Ain-i Dahsala chapter of the A'in-i Akbari. Akbar's administration justified the revision on the ground that the older official rates (rai) had ceased to reflect reality: collections were being made at rates far above the notional one-third, and the new dasturs were meant to bring the paper demand and the actual demand into one frame.

Measurement itself was standardised. Akbar introduced the gaz-i Ilahi (roughly 32 inches) as the standard yard, and the bigha, defined as sixty gaz square, was recalculated accordingly; endorsements on surviving revenue-free grant documents record the reductions in recorded area that the new yard produced. Uniformity nevertheless remained a North Indian phenomenon. Crop-sharing continued in Thatta (Sind), where the Tarkhan jagirdars were reported in 1634 to take up to half the harvest, and Kashmir retained its own village-based system, described in detail by Abu'l-Fazl; in other regions kankut remained usual, and it is improbable that zabt ever covered the whole cultivated land even of a fully regulation province.

=== Collection and documents ===
Once the assessment was struck, the administration issued the cultivator a written engagement, the patta (also qaul or qaul-qarar), stating the demand, and took from him a counter-deed of acceptance, the qabuliyat. The A'in urged the collector to deal with each cultivator individually, giving a document and taking one in return, and the accountancy manuals of the next century repeated the advice. Collection, whatever the method of assessment, took place at harvest time. The revenue was normally paid into the treasury through the amil (collector), although Akbar's administration tried to encourage direct payment by the peasants, who were entitled to written receipts. The amil deposited copies of his detailed accounts of collections, arrears, and expenses with the qanungo, the hereditary registrar of the pargana, who countersigned assessments alongside the chaudhuri and the village headmen.

The state also acted, within limits, as a source of agricultural credit. Taqavi loans for seed, cattle, and the resettlement of deserted land were advanced through the chaudhuris and muqaddams, who distributed them among the peasants and stood surety for repayment; collection of arrears could be sanctioned in annual instalments.

=== Jagir and khalisa lands ===
The assessed revenue of the empire was divided between the khalisa, the reserved lands whose collections flowed directly to the imperial treasury, and the jagir assignments made over to mansabdars in lieu of salary. The distinction between the assessed figure (jama, expressed for assignment purposes in dams as the jama-dami) and the sum actually collected (hasil) ran through the whole fiscal system, and the divergence of the two became a standing administrative problem. Estimates of past collections, the hasil-i kamil (maximum realised revenue), were kept on record and used to check the collectors and to revise the jama. Shireen Moosvi's statistical reconstruction of the A'in-i Akbari data shows the khalisa share varying markedly by province, larger in the core provinces of Agra and Lahore and smaller in Bengal, Ajmer, and Bihar; the jagir portion of the jama meanwhile marks the minimum share of the revenues alienated to the nobility.

=== Other imposts ===
Beyond the land revenue the state levied customs and transit dues, and, at times, the jizya, the Islamic poll tax on non-Muslims. Akbar abolished the jizya in 1579, along with the pilgrimage tax on Hindus, as part of his policy of incorporating non-Muslims into the imperial order. Aurangzeb reimposed it in 1679; the measure provoked mass protests in Delhi, where crowds gathered before the emperor's palace balcony, and its collection thereafter ran unevenly alongside a 4 per cent annual increment that provincial diwans were adding to the assessed land revenue.

=== The treasury and the mints ===
The fiscal system rested on a trimetallic currency struck at imperial mints on the principle of free coinage: merchants and money-changers (sarrafs) brought bullion and foreign coin to the mints, where it was struck into the silver rupee of about 179 grains and the gold muhr of about 169 grains against payment of minting charges. The copper dam served as the money of account in which the revenue schedules and the salaries of mansabdars were expressed, even when actual payment was made in silver and gold. Because the relative prices of the three metals moved with trade flows, the exchange ratio between dam and rupee was allowed to float, and the mint administration adjusted mint prices, and on occasion the fineness of the coin, to keep bullion flowing in. The mint network was dense and decentralised: in 1595 copper was struck at forty-two mints, rupees at fourteen, and muhrs at four, and the number of rupee mints had grown to about forty under Aurangzeb. Every coin carried its mint's name and year of issue, and circulated at small discounts as it aged, the newly struck taza sikka commanding a premium. Because gold and copper were themselves currency metals, the rupee rates of the muhr and the dam moved with the metals market, and the administration left them to float. The system fed a hoard of legendary size: Abdul Aziz's study of the imperial treasury put Shah Jahan's accumulated wealth at his deposition in 1658 at about 23 crores of rupees in valuables besides 24 crores in coined money.

=== Religious and charitable grants ===
Alongside the salary assignments the emperor alienated revenue in favour of religion and learning. Grants known as madad-i ma'ash ("aid for subsistence"), and in older usage suyurghal, milk, or amlak, conveyed the land revenue of specified plots to scholars, sufi lineages, the descendants of saints, and families of established learning or respectability, for life or in perpetuity. Endowments in trust (waqf) likewise maintained shrines, tombs, and madrasas, paying for repairs, staff, and charity. These grants were administered under the sadr as-sudur and, though small as a share of the total revenue, tied the empire's religious classes to the dynasty's fortunes.

== Provincial and local administration ==
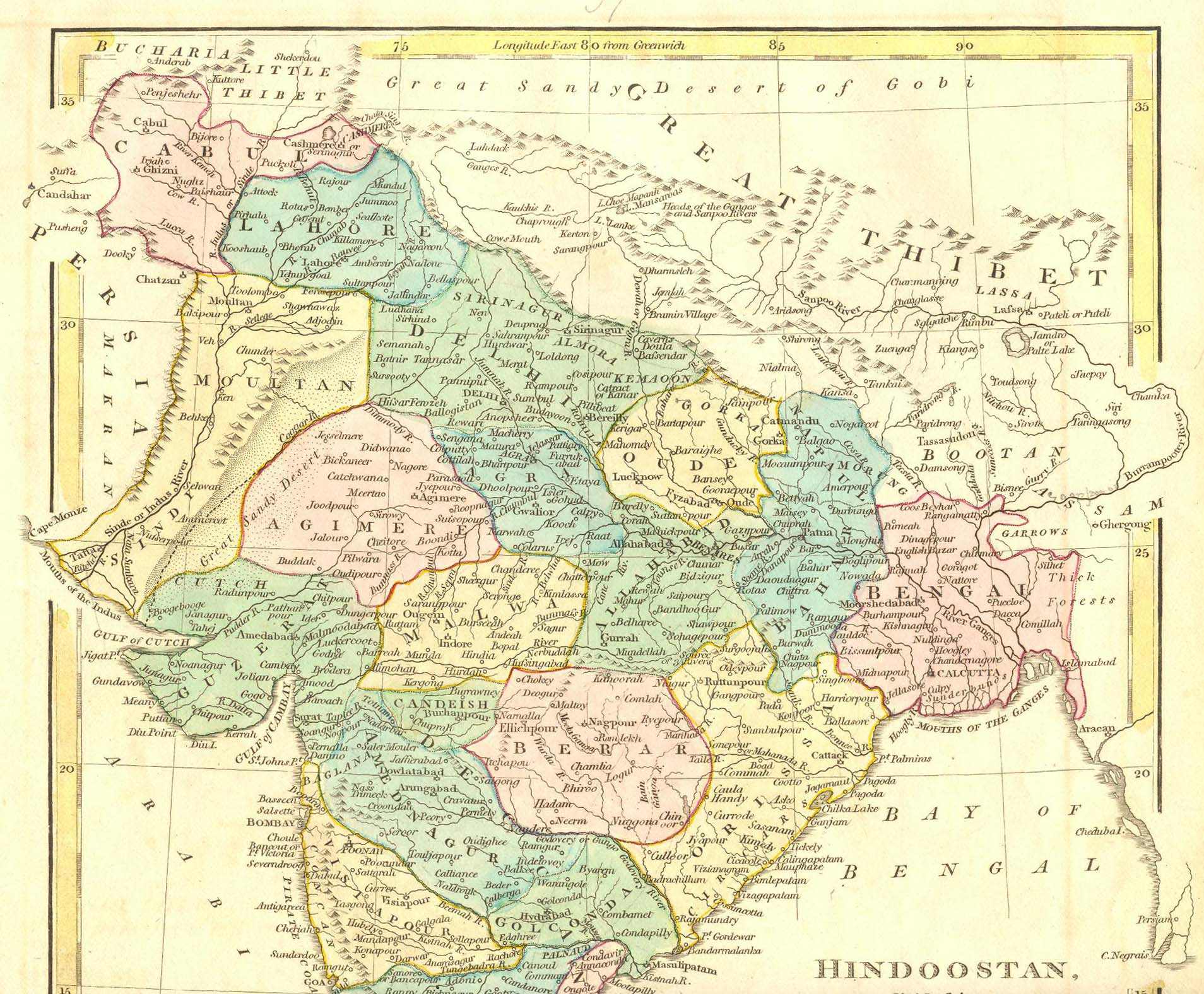
The subahs of northern Mughal India as mapped in Wilkinson's Atlas (1815), following the provincial divisions recorded in the A'in-i-Akbari.

The empire's territorial framework was settled by Akbar. In 1595 the imperial dominions were organised into twelve subahs (provinces), a number which rose to fifteen with the annexation of Khandesh, Berar, and Ahmadnagar, and to around twenty after the Deccan conquests of Aurangzeb's reign. P. Saran, whose monograph remains the standard account, stressed that the provinces varied greatly in status, resources, and strategic weight.

=== The subah ===
Each subah was headed by a governor, styled sipahsalar under Akbar and later commonly subahdar or nazim. On appointment he was invested with the insignia of office, and an instrument of instructions was issued to him defining the scope of his responsibility, advising him on public and private conduct, and commanding those under him to obedience. Orders of appointment and transfer travelled to the province through a sazawal, an official conveyor, and were received by the governor with formal ceremony.

The governor's power was hedged by a parallel provincial establishment appointed from the centre and answerable to it. When Muzaffar Khan Turbati was made governor of Bengal in 1579, separate imperial appointments simultaneously filled the offices of provincial bakhshi, diwan, sadr, and news-recorder (waqia-navis). The provincial diwan, though nominally under the governor's supervision, answered to the imperial diwan at court and took his orders from there; under Jahangir and Shah Jahan the office grew steadily more independent of the governor. The provincial sadr headed the province's qazis and mir adls, whose appointments carried his signature and whose work ran under his direction. A waqia-navis posted in every province, dependent on the court rather than on the governor, kept the emperor informed of all that occurred.

=== Sarkar and pargana ===
Below the subah the only general administrative division was the sarkar (district), whose executive head was the faujdar, a military-administrative officer responsible for order, with the amalguzar in charge of its revenue; the faujdar represented what Saran called "the executive half of the government". His responsibility for the roads was personal: travellers were escorted from jurisdiction to jurisdiction, and Thevenot reported that the faujdar of Surat had to answer for robberies committed in the country he was bound to secure. The sarkar was composed of parganas (sub-districts). In the pargana the police and criminal-justice functions that the faujdar and kotwal discharged at higher levels were combined in the shiqdar, while civil justice belonged to the pargana qazi and revenue administration to the amil. The amil carried on assessment and collection with his clerks (karkun), the treasurer (fotadar), and the semi-official registrars, the qanungo, the patwari, and the village headmen, a staffing pattern continued from Sher Shah's administration.

Cities had their own regime under the kotwal, whose duties are unusually well documented in surviving instruments of instruction: he was to be accessible to all without intermediaries, to maintain a register of the townspeople ward by ward, and to run networks of watchmen and spies. The great ports were administered as separate revenue units (mahals) outside the ordinary territorial chain: the mutasaddi of a port such as Surat was in effect its governor, with sole responsibility for its administration in all matters short of imperial policy.

Administrative boundaries were not static. Sarkars could be raised to subah status and parganas shifted between sarkars as revenue surveys and political conditions changed, and the state relied on written schedules of village names, areas, and assessed revenue rather than on systematic cartographic surveys.

=== Zamindars and the village ===
Below and beside the formal hierarchy stood the zamindars, hereditary local magnates whose claims ranged from a share in the harvest of a single village to the lordship of a large tract. Their claims, held by inheritance, ran to a share of the harvest, to private holdings exempt from the ordinary demand, and to cesses of their own on peasants, craftsmen, and merchants. The imperial system treated the zamindar's collection of land revenue as a "service" (khidmat) owed to the state, and a zamindar who failed to perform it could be dispossessed. Habib has emphasised the political weight of this class: the word covered everyone from petty village right-holders to autonomous chiefs, and the management of zamindars, by conciliation or suppression, was a permanent concern of Mughal government. One measure of the system's reach in the zabt provinces is that most villages now dealt with the state's revenue officers directly, something no earlier regime had achieved, and the pargana ceased to be a miniature tributary kingdom and became a unit of imperial administration.

The village itself was managed by its headman (muqaddam) and accountant (patwari), through whom taqavi credit was channelled and revenue engagements signed; village councils (panchayats) existed, but their operation in the Mughal era is sparsely documented.

== Military organisation ==
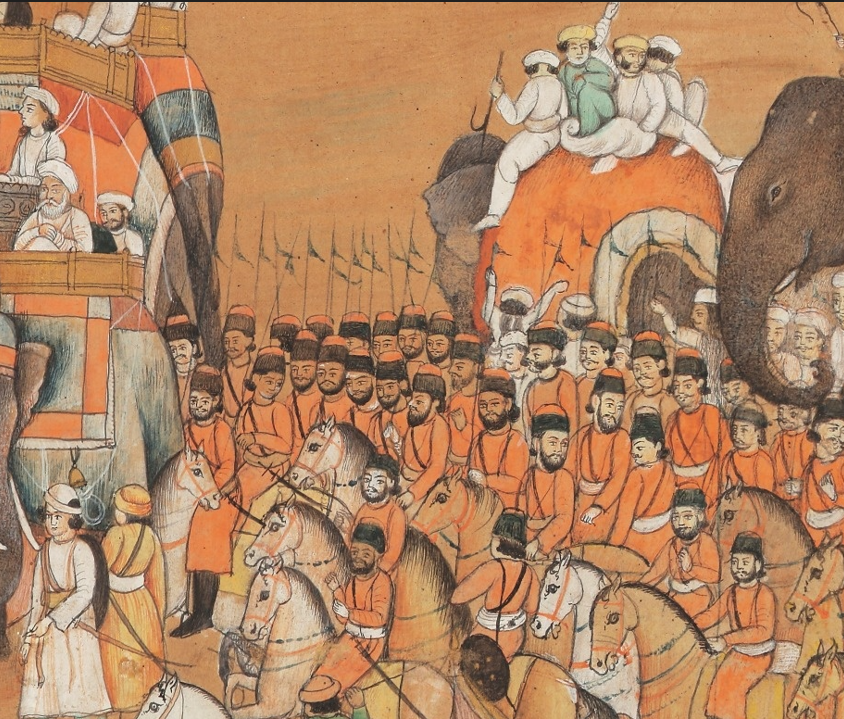
Mughal cavalry in a Durbar procession. The empire's military rested on heavy cavalry recruited and paid through the mansabdari rank system.

The Mughal armed forces were a composite, not a standing national army: the cavalry contingents of the mansabdars formed the core, flanked by the ahadis (gentleman troopers serving the emperor directly rather than under a mansabdar, and functioning, in Paul Horn's phrase that Irvine thought only partially true, as a guard-cavalry corps), supplementary contingents, the artillery establishment, and the enormous militia of the zamindars. Jos Gommans puts the empire's mounted strength at somewhere between one and two hundred thousand horse-warriors, each with one or two mounts, despite an Indian climate poorly suited to horse-breeding. Beside this paid establishment, Abu'l-Fazl put the total strength of the zamindars' troops across the empire at more than 4.4 million men, enumerated province by province in the A'in-i Akbari.

Cavalry was the deciding arm. The heavy horseman rode armoured, with helmet and mail, vambraces, greaves, and plated cuirass, while the mounted archer supplied the mobile firepower that, as Douglas Streusand has stressed, won the early Mughals their battles. Tactics and technology remained deliberately conservative: mounted archers and heavy cavalry had dominated Indian warfare long before the Mughals, and the dynasty innovated little on them. Because their military thinking rested on the mobility and shooting power of massed horsemen, the Mughals dispensed with drilled infantry on the European or Janissary model, and innovations like the socket bayonet and the ball-cartridge never entered their armoury.

The supply of war-horses was itself an object of policy. Akbar purged inferior country breeds from the imperial stables, paid horse-dealers high prices in ready money to attract good animals, and taxed every horse imported through Kabul and Qandahar at two to three rupees, making the overland horse trade at once a military lifeline and a source of revenue.

Artillery (topkhana) was organised in two establishments: the heavy park, which on the march in the early eighteenth century could comprise seventy pieces of large brass cannon with 300 dromedaries each carrying a swivel-gun (zamburak), and the light "artillery of the stirrup" (topkhana-i rikab), a household artillery of small pieces that always accompanied the emperor. Unlike the cavalry mass, whose men were paid by the chiefs under whose banner they enlisted, the personnel of the imperial artillery drew their pay directly from imperial funds.

Fortresses anchored the whole. Sher Shah had already set the pattern of planting forts along the trunk roads, his stronghold at Rohtas guarding the highway to Kabul, and the Mughals inherited a strategic landscape in which garrisoned forts secured routes, frontiers, and the countryside between them.

Logistics shaped campaigning as much as battle. The army's grain moved with the Banjaras, itinerant carriers whose bullock caravans supplied the imperial forces on the march; Akbar kept some 7,000 transport oxen in service, and many thousands more were hired for campaigns. The system had limits: beyond the Hindu Kush the army found no equivalent of the Banjaras and could neither forage nor buy its way, and in the Deccan the Marathas made a strategy of stretching and cutting the grain lines on which Mughal sieges depended.

== Intelligence and communications ==
The centre's knowledge of its provinces ran through a layered corps of news-writers. The waqia-navis (news-recorder), posted in every province and dependent on the court rather than on the governor, registered all that occurred within his charge. Beside him worked the sawanih-nigar, who in the later empire doubled as the provincial postal superintendent, forwarding the reports, despatches, and correspondence of the provincial diwans and governors under seal; and the khufia-navis, the "secret writer", whose confidential letters bypassed the open channels; in many provinces and army commands the posts of bakhshi and waqia-navis were held by the same man.

Beneath the writers worked the harkaras, the empire's couriers, scouts, and plain spies: a court diary of 1708 puts four thousand of them in imperial service, scattered across the provinces, and the intelligence department welcomed reports "descending even to idle gossip and scandal", in peace as in war.

The reports moved on the imperial post, the dak chauki, relays of horses and runners along the trunk routes. Standing instructions to a provincial governor required him, among his other duties, to send two despatches to court every month by dak chauki reporting the occurrences of the province. The system's independence was defended from the top. The darogha who headed the intelligence establishment enjoyed great influence under Aurangzeb, who regarded the spies as his eyes: a governor who publicly beat a local news-writer for an unflattering report could find the darogha taking up his subordinate's cause and getting the governor punished.

== Court, capitals and camp ==
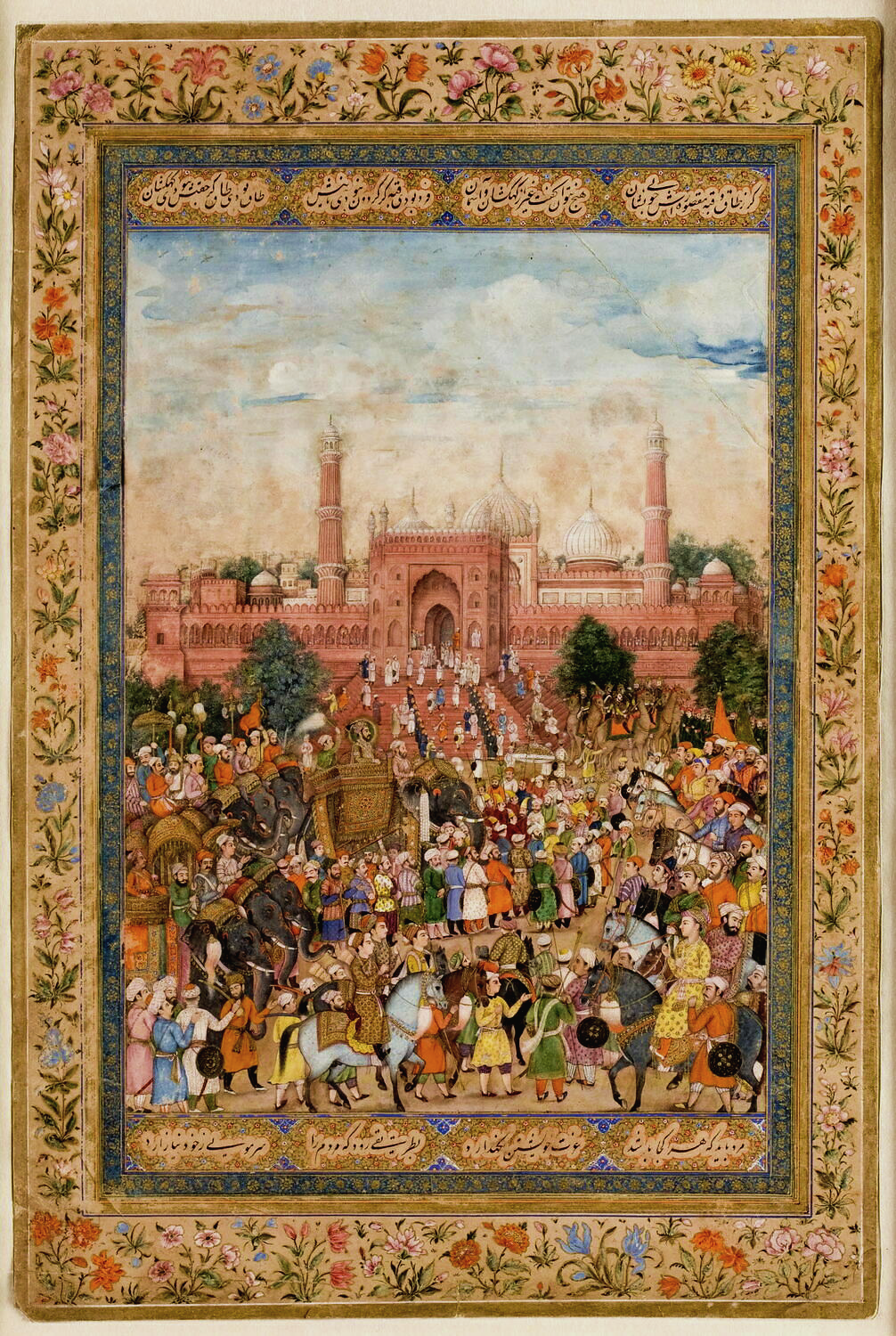
Farrukhsiyar in ceremonial procession before the Jama Masjid of Shahjahanabad. Processions linking the fort, the great mosque, and the city's main street were a central ritual of court life in the capital.

For most of its history the empire had no fixed seat: the capital was wherever the emperor was. Akbar made no commitment to a permanent capital, and his court, household, chancery, treasury, stables, and armouries moved from city to city as circumstances suggested. In 1571 he built Fatehpur Sikri, twenty-six miles from Agra, and ruled from it until 1585; Lahore and Agra each served long turns thereafter. The culmination was Shahjahanabad, begun by Shah Jahan in 1639, which Stephen Blake analysed as the archetypal "sovereign city": the palace-fortress served as the microcosm and model for the city at large, and the emperor attempted to organise urban society itself on the pattern of the patriarchal household.

Government moved with the court. In the Hall of Ordinary Audience (diwan-i am) the emperor transacted the routine of state: reading reports, receiving ambassadors, admitting mansabdars to service, conferring titles and grants. On campaign or royal progress the same institutions travelled as the imperial camp, laid out to a fixed plan in which the colour, spacing, and height of the tents followed the court's hierarchy, the great red tents being reserved for the emperor; the daily rhythm of prayers, darshan, and public and private audiences continued in canvas, and even the army's marching order reproduced the camp's arrangement. The scale was urban: Blake's reconstruction of the camp of 1650 counts about 317,000 people, and the European travellers Careri and Manucci reckoned the moving court of Aurangzeb's day at anywhere from 300,000 to half a million souls, with 250 bazaars and a circumference of some thirty miles, advancing about eight kilometres a day.

The camp's capacity to swallow the government whole was proved at the end of the century. Aurangzeb kept his capital at Shahjahanabad for his first twenty years, then made the grand encampment itself the movable capital of the empire as he shifted south; during the Deccan wars the emperor's camp served as the seat of government for a generation, occupying sites between Pune and Bijapur before settling at Brahmapuri in 1695.

== Law ==
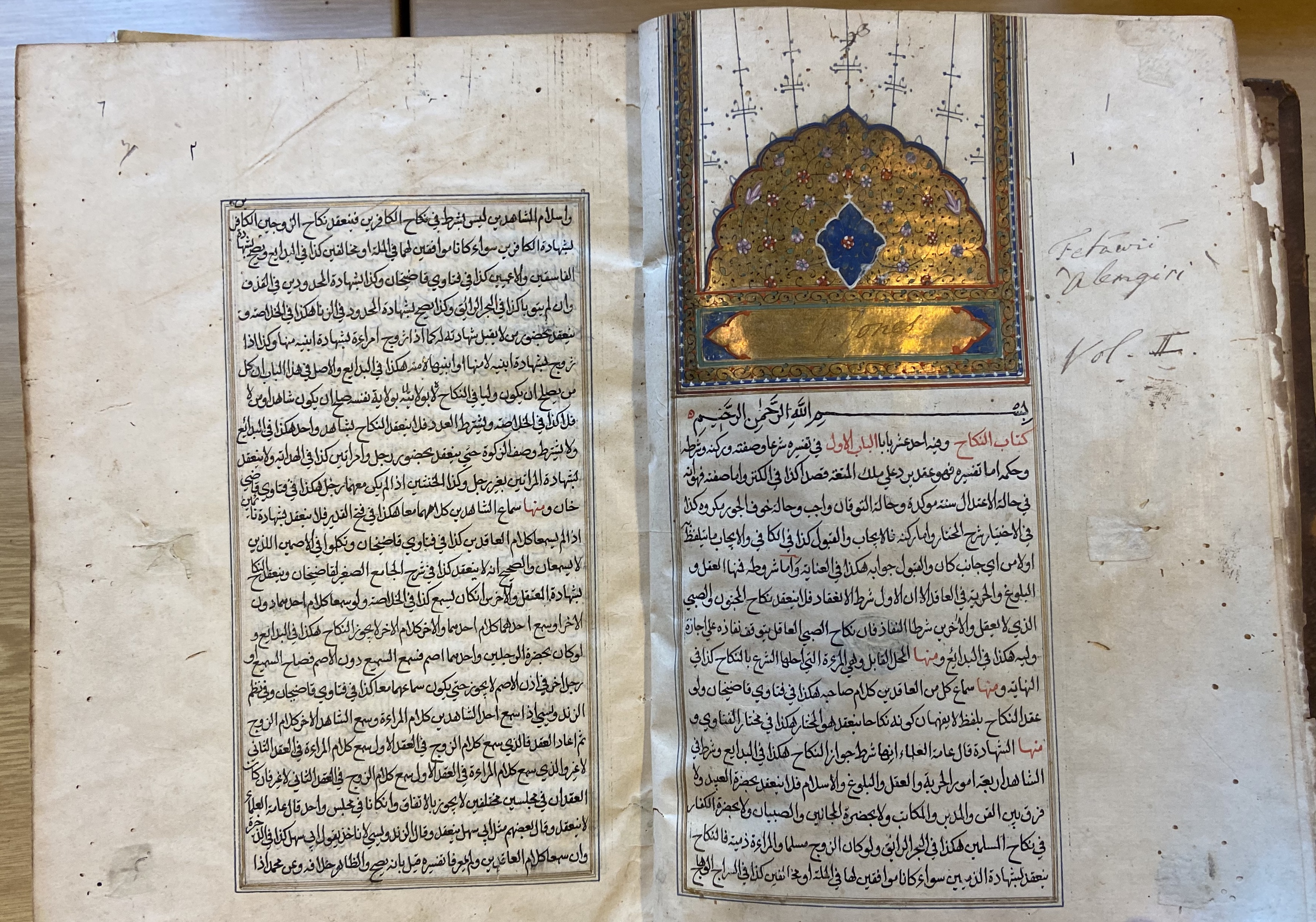
A manuscript copy of the Fatawa-yi Alamgiri, the imperial legal compilation commissioned by Aurangzeb as the standard reference for Mughal qazi courts.

The empire's legal order was Islamic in reference and plural in practice. The Sunni Hanafi school supplied the jurisprudence (fiqh), administered by qazis whose remit ran from criminal trials to the validation of deeds; but the state that applied it governed a population that remained predominantly non-Muslim, and Nandini Chatterjee's work on Mughal legal documents has shown how deeply the resulting hybrid forms penetrated everyday transactions far below the court.

Criminal justice belonged in the first instance to the qazi: suits between Muslims, and any serious criminal matter with a Muslim party, went to his court, a mufti supplying the juristic opinion on which the judgment rested. Qazis formed a loose hierarchy, from the pargana judge up to the qazi al-quddat attached to the mobile court and the qazi-yi lashkar of the army, appointed on the sadr's recommendation. The office's documentary role was as important as its judicial one: deeds, tax records, and the registers of judgements (sijillat) carried the qazi's seal, and were treated as authentic on its strength. Non-Muslims made regular use of these courts. A separate officer, the muhtasib (censor), policed public morals and the market, charged with putting down practices forbidden by religious injunction.

Above the courts stood the emperor, in practice a tribunal of highest appeal rather than first instance. Jadunath Sarkar's classic account describes the justice sessions at which officers presented plaintiffs one by one, the emperor ascertained the facts, "took the law from the ulema and pronounced judgment accordingly"; Jahangir advertised the same accessibility with the "chain of justice" hung outside his quarters at the Agra fort, its purpose, in his own words, to give "the oppressed" a means to attract the emperor's attention. Sarkar also registered the system's structural defect: there was no regular gradation of courts, no organised judicial hierarchy in the modern sense, so that justice depended on the officer and the access a subject could get.

The reach of this documentary order shows in the family archives that survive from the period: hoards of sale deeds, acknowledgements (iqrar), and orders (parvana) in Persian legal forms, bearing phraseology that was distinctively Indian and recording practices no compendium of jurisprudence describes.

Under Aurangzeb the state's legal Islamisation deepened. The imperially sponsored Fatawa-yi Alamgiri, completed in 1692, was the greatest compilation of Islamic jurisprudence produced in India, and its long section on taxation attempted to align the documented practice of Mughal revenue collection with the categories of the sharia.

== Decline of the administrative system ==
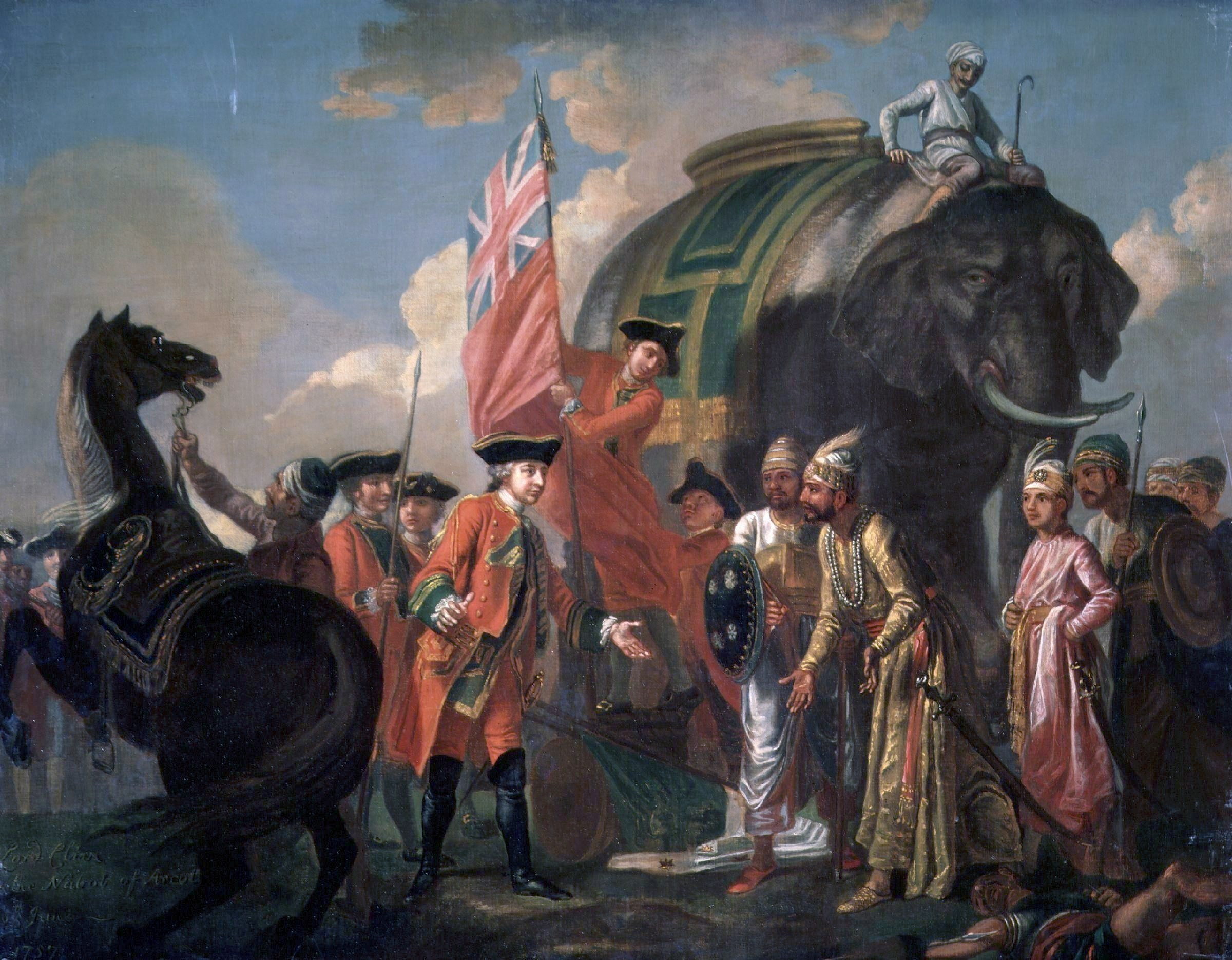
Francis Hayman, Robert Clive and Mir Jafar after the Battle of Plassey (c. 1762). The 1757 coup and the Company's later acquisition of Bengal's revenues ended Mughal administrative sovereignty over the empire's richest province.

The classical system strained visibly from the late seventeenth century. At its root lay arithmetic: some four-fifths of the empire's assessed revenue was alienated to the jagirdars, so that the balance between the size of the noble corps and the revenue available for assignment governed the health of the whole machine. As the Deccan wars swelled the nobility faster than usable jama, officers waited for assignments and collections fell short of paper values; by Aurangzeb's last years the complaint that "no paibaqi was left", no revenue remaining to assign, recurs constantly in the sources, sometimes in the emperor's own letters, and hard-pressed jagirdars squeezed the zamindars beneath them. Richards added the structural observation that the transfer system itself corroded the countryside: a jagirdar holding his lands for three or four years had no long-term interest in them.

Aurangzeb's Deccan commitment (1681–1707) turned strain into crisis. Victory over Bijapur, Golconda, and the Maratha kingdom brought no peace: the more men and treasure the empire fed into the south, the longer the Maratha war ran, embezzlement of revenues by imperial officers became pervasive, and after 1689 public order and regular administration decayed in old provinces and new alike. The regime's preoccupation with fighting the Marathas foreclosed the older remedy of absorbing them, and the late empire failed at what Akbar's had done best: converting armed local powers into servants of the state.

After Aurangzeb's death in 1707 the centre consumed itself in succession wars and factional politics. The Sayyid brothers, owing their rise to the civil-war conjuncture, made and unmade emperors; in 1719 they forced Farrukhsiyar to dismiss the officers who controlled his own fort and audiences before deposing him. In the provinces, governors began securing long tenures and placing loyal diwans beside themselves, collapsing the old dyarchy: Muzaffar Alam's study of Awadh dates the first such attempt to 1714–15, and by mid-century Awadh, Bengal, and Hyderabad were hereditary successor states in all but name. Richards chose 1720 as the end point of his history of the empire on the ground that by then "the essential structure of centralized empire was disintegrated beyond repair"; Nadir Shah's sack of Delhi in 1739 carried off the Peacock Throne and what remained of the treasury.

== Legacy ==
The empire's administrative forms outlived its power. The successor rulers were, formally, Mughal governors still, and they continued to seek investiture and legitimacy from Delhi: as Alam observes of the eighteenth century, the symbols of empire remained persuasive even after the power that had promoted them decayed. The East India Company inserted itself into the same fictions. Its first substantial territorial revenue, near Madras, was styled the Company's "jagir", language that cast the British as servants of the Nawab of Arcot, under the Nizam of Hyderabad, under the emperor. After Clive's coup at Plassey in 1757, the Company's acquisition of Bengal's public finance let it pay for its Indian trade out of Mughal-style land revenue, collected through the inherited machinery of the province. The dynasty's legitimacy survived this hollowing for another century: the great rebellion of 1857 centred itself on the last emperor, Bahadur Shah Zafar, "physically decrepit and surrounded by a territorial and political void", a fact Mukhia reads as the sharpest testimony to the persistence of Mughal legitimacy long after Mughal power; the rebellion's defeat extinguished the dynasty itself.

== Historiography ==
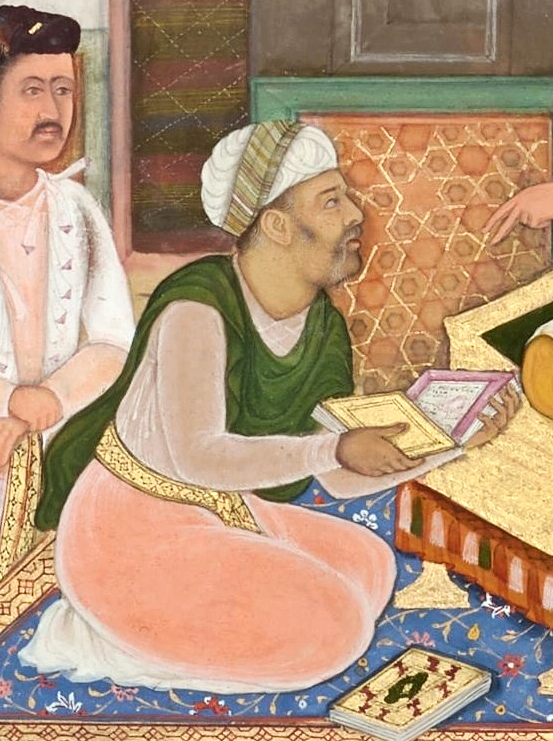
Abu'l-Fazl ibn Mubarak, Akbar's ideologue and the author of the Akbarnama and Ain-i-Akbari, the foundational primary sources on Mughal government. Portrait attributed to Govardhan, c. 1602–1605.

How centralised Mughal government really was remains the central debate of the field. The Aligarh school of historians, built around Irfan Habib, M. Athar Ali, and Shireen Moosvi, described a "centralized-bureaucratic polity" of extreme administrative systematisation, a "quasi-modern state" resting on measurement, records, and extraction; the phrase and the model, as Farhat Hasan notes, gained currency far beyond Aligarh itself.

Stephen P. Blake's 1979 article "The Patrimonial-Bureaucratic Empire of the Mughals" set the influential counter-frame. Adapting Max Weber's typology, Blake read the empire as a vastly extended royal household: the A'in-i Akbari divides government into household, army, and empire, exactly as a thirteenth-century Mongol decree had done, and the men of the imperial household supervised the provincial officers on the emperor's behalf. The model, he stressed, was "a suggestion, an outline, a guide" rather than a finished explanation.

Later revisionists pushed further, from form to process. Farhat Hasan's study of the Gujarat towns presents the state as "a process in constant negotiation with local power relations", viewed from the localities rather than the imperial centre, and criticises the older models, whatever their conclusions, for debating everything on the military-fiscal axis while isolating the state from social forces. Muzaffar Alam's work on the eighteenth century recast "decline" itself, finding in the provinces not simple collapse but regional reconfiguration in which imperial symbols retained force. Munis Faruqui added the princely households to the picture of state formation, arguing that the succession system older historians treated as dysfunction was one of the empire's integrative engines.

Comparative framing has its own history. The label "gunpowder empires", coined in the Marshall Hodgson–William McNeill tradition to explain Ottoman, Safavid, and Mughal success by siege artillery, remains current even though Douglas Streusand, whose comparative study keeps the term, judges the hypothesis itself inadequate as explanation; his own account stresses the shared Turko-Persian institutional inheritance, differently adapted in each empire. In that comparison, Mughal central government appears as a compound of Perso-Islamic and Turko-Mongol traditions modified for Indian conditions, less elaborately hierarchical than the Ottoman apparatus but harnessed to a deeper revenue reach.

== See also ==
- Mughal dynasty
- Mughal emperors
- Army of the Mughal Empire
- Economy of the Mughal Empire
- Mughal fiscal system
- Foreign relations of the Mughal Empire
- Mansabdar
- Jagirdar
- Zamindar

== Sources ==
- Alam, Muzaffar (1986). The Crisis of Empire in Mughal North India: Awadh and the Punjab, 1707–1748. Delhi: Oxford University Press. ISBN 978-0-19-563000-8.
- Ali, M. Athar (1997) [1966]. The Mughal Nobility Under Aurangzeb (Revised ed.). Oxford University Press. ISBN 978-0-19-563976-6.
- Aziz, Abdul (1942). The Imperial Treasury of the Indian Mughals. Lahore: The author.
- Aziz, Abdul (1945). The Mansabdari System and the Mughal Army. Lahore: The author.
- Blake, Stephen P. (1979). "The Patrimonial-Bureaucratic Empire of the Mughals". The Journal of Asian Studies. 39 (1): 77–94. doi:10.2307/2053505. JSTOR 2053505.
- Blake, Stephen P. (1991). Shahjahanabad: The Sovereign City in Mughal India 1639–1739. Cambridge University Press. ISBN 978-0-521-39045-3.
- Chandra, Satish (2002) [1959]. Parties and Politics at the Mughal Court, 1707–1740. Oxford University Press. ISBN 978-0-19-565444-8.
- Chatterjee, Nandini (2020). Negotiating Mughal Law: A Family of Landlords across Three Indian Empires. Cambridge University Press. doi:10.1017/9781108623391. ISBN 978-1-108-48603-3.
- Chatterjee, Nandini (2014). "Reflections on Religious Difference and Permissive Inclusion in Mughal Law". Journal of Law and Religion. 29 (3): 396–415. doi:10.1017/jlr.2014.20. hdl:10871/15975.
- Chatterjee, Nandini (2019), "Courts of law, Mughal", Encyclopaedia of Islam, THREE, Brill, doi:10.1163/1573-3912_ei3_com_25171
- Eaton, Richard M. (2019). India in the Persianate Age, 1000–1765. Allen Lane. ISBN 978-0-7139-9582-4.
- Faruqui, Munis D. (2012). The Princes of the Mughal Empire, 1504–1719. Cambridge University Press. doi:10.1017/CBO9781139135474. ISBN 978-1-107-02217-1.
- Gommans, Jos (2002). Mughal Warfare: Indian Frontiers and Highroads to Empire 1500–1700. Routledge. ISBN 978-0-415-23989-9.
- Habib, Irfan (2014). The Agrarian System of Mughal India 1556–1707 (3rd ed.). Oxford University Press. ISBN 978-0-19-807742-8.
- Haider, Najaf (1996). "Precious Metal Flows and Currency Circulation in the Mughal Empire". Journal of the Economic and Social History of the Orient. 39 (3): 298–364. doi:10.1163/1568520962601180.
- Hasan, Farhat (2004). State and Locality in Mughal India: Power Relations in Western India, c. 1572–1730. Cambridge University Press. ISBN 978-0-521-84119-1.
- Ibn Hasan (1936). The Central Structure of the Mughal Empire and its Practical Working up to the Year 1657. London: Oxford University Press.
- Irvine, William (1903). The Army of the Indian Moghuls: Its Organization and Administration. London: Luzac and Co.
- Michael, Bernardo A. (2012). Statemaking and Territory in South Asia: Lessons from the Anglo–Gorkha War (1814–1816). Anthem Press. doi:10.7135/upo9780857285324. ISBN 978-0-85728-532-4.
- Moin, A. Azfar (2012). The Millennial Sovereign: Sacred Kingship and Sainthood in Islam. Columbia University Press. ISBN 978-0-231-16036-0.
- Moosvi, Shireen (2015). The Economy of the Mughal Empire c. 1595: A Statistical Study (2nd ed.). Oxford University Press. ISBN 978-0-19-945054-1.
- Mukhia, Harbans (2004). The Mughals of India. Blackwell. ISBN 978-0-631-18555-0.
- Raychaudhuri, Tapan; Habib, Irfan, eds. (1982). The Cambridge Economic History of India, Volume 1: c. 1200 – c. 1750. Cambridge University Press. ISBN 978-0-521-22692-9.
- Richards, John F. (1993). The Mughal Empire. The New Cambridge History of India. Cambridge University Press. doi:10.1017/CBO9780511584060. ISBN 978-0-521-56603-2.
- Saran, P. (1941). The Provincial Government of the Mughals, 1526–1658. Allahabad: Kitabistan.
- Sarkar, Jadunath (1920). Mughal Administration. Calcutta: M.C. Sarkar and Sons.
- Streusand, Douglas E. (2011). Islamic Gunpowder Empires: Ottomans, Safavids, and Mughals. Westview Press. ISBN 978-0-8133-1359-7.
- Tripathi, Ram Prasad (1956). Some Aspects of Muslim Administration (2nd ed.). Allahabad: Central Book Depot.

=== Primary sources ===
- Abul Fazl (1873). The Ain i Akbari, Volume I. Translated by Blochmann, H. Calcutta: Asiatic Society of Bengal.
