= Madar'i =

Dalit community in North India

Zinda Shah Madar
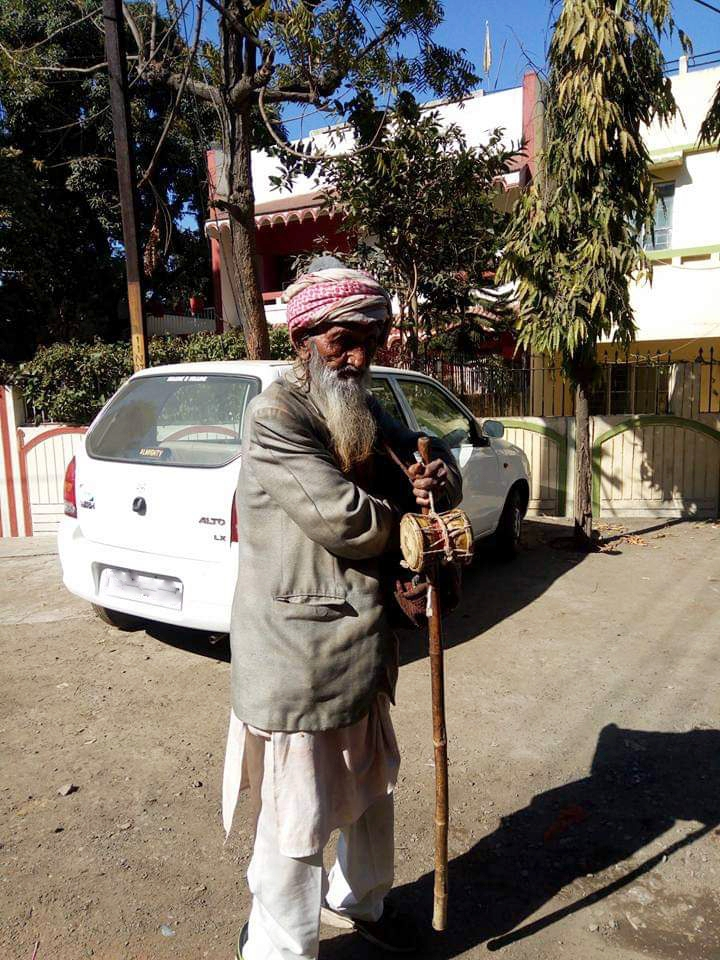

Regions with significant populations
- India; Pakistan

Religion
- Islam

Related ethnic groups
- Faqir; Jogi Faqir

Madari, also known as the Zinda Shah Madar and the Dewan Shah, are a Sufi order, who are derived from the Dewangan Silsila of Sufi Syed Zinda Shah Madar. Dewan/Diwan is not a caste but the name of a Sufi order executed by Sufi Dewan Syed Zamaluddin Janeman Jannati.

The Dewan community descends from Sadaat group of Zinda Shah Madar whose original shrine (majar) is located in Makanpur, Uttar Pardesh, India. The literal meaning of Dewan is the head of a Khanqah, Chief or Master. In village areas, Dewan surname is mostly used, but in the urban area, the same community is also known by different surnames such as Shah, Syed etc. Most of the Sufi Dargahs belong to Shah community. The surnames Shah and Syed are interchangeably used by the communities descending from Dewan tribe. They are a Muslim community found in a North India. They are a community of Muslim Syed Sufi Fakir, who are originally from descendants of Syed Badiuddin Zinda Shah Madar through His Caliphate Syed Zamaluddin Janeman Jannati).

They are OBC in the list of Himachal Pradesh.
