= Syed Jamaluddin Madari =

Sufi saint of Madariyya order

Hazrat Syed Jamaluddin Madari

Leader of Madariyya Sufi order
- Preceded by: Shah Badiuddin Qutbul Madar
- Title: Janeman Jannati

Personal life
- Born: Syed Jamaluddin
- Died: Hilsa, Bihar
- Home town: Hilsa, Bihar
- Known for: Dewangan sufi order

Religious life
- Religion: Islam
- Jurisprudence: Hanafi
- Tariqa: Madariyya

Muslim leader
- Teacher: Shah Badiuddin Qutbul Madar

Syed Muhammad Jamaluddin Madari popularly known as Janeman Jannati was a disciple of Shah Badiuddin Qutbul Madar and a Sufi saint of Madariyya order of Sufism. He is known as the nephew of Abdul Qadir Jilani and one of the four main Khalifa of Shah Badiuddin Qutbul Madar. He was the founder of the Dewangan sub-order of Madariyya, whose followers use 'Malang' as their surname.

== Successors ==
- Syed Lajan Sarmast Dewangan
- Pyare Baba Dewangan
- Mithe Miyan Dewangan
- Nagari Dewangan
- Baba Man Dewangan
- Shah Mahmud Dewangan
- Kazi Mahmud Dewangan
- Data Lodi Shah Dewan
