= Karim Shah =

Bengali mystic (1710-1813)

Faqir Karim Shah
- করীম শাহ

Leader of the Pagal Panthis
- In office 1775–1813
- Preceded by: Musa Shah
- Succeeded by: Tipu Shah

Personal details
- Born: 1710
- Died: 1813 (aged 102–103) Mymensingh District, Bengal Presidency

Karim Shah (Bengali: করীম শাহ), also known as Karam Shah (Bengali: করম শাহ), was the founder of the mystic Pagal Panthi order in eastern Bengal (present-day Bangladesh).

== Biography ==
Though the origins of Karim Shah are shrouded in mystery, it can be known that he was a disciple of Musa Shah, who was the nephew and successor of Majnu Shah. Karim Shah resided in the village of Letarkanda in Pargana Sushang (presently under Durgapur Upazila, Netrokona). It is estimated that his propagation began in 1775. His teachings attracted Sufis, Hindus and animists alike, and the members of his cult came to be known by commoners as Pagals (madmen). Though the cult was non-violent, its members claimed that Karim Shah possessed spiritual prowess such as the ability to cure diseases, foretelling and bringing success to those he wished.

He married Chandi Bibi, and had a son known as Tipu Shah, who succeeded Karim as the movement's leader after his death in 1813.
