= Tipu Shah =

17th-century Bengali rebel

Faqir Tipu Shah
- টিপু শাহ

Leader of the Pagal Panthis
- In office 1813–1827
- Preceded by: Karim Shah
- Succeeded by: Dubraj Pathor; Janku Pathor

Personal details
- Born: Mymensingh District, Bengal Presidency
- Died: 1852 Mymensingh District, Bengal Presidency
- Parents: Karim Shah (father); Chandi Bibi (mother)

Tipu Shah (Bengali: টিপু শাহ; died 1852) was the second leader of the mystic Pagal Panthi Order in Mymensingh (present-day Bangladesh). He commanded the Order and the local peasantry in revolts against the British East India Company and managed to establish an independent state in Sherpur.

== Early life ==
Tipu Shah was born into a Sufi Muslim fakir family of Pathan ancestry who had settled in Letarkanda, Pargana Sushang (presently under Purbadhala, Netrokona). His father, Karim Shah, founded the mystic Pagal Panthi Order (considered to be the established successor of Majnu Shah's activism) after being inspired by his predecessor Musa Shah. His mother, Chandi Bibi, also played an important role in the Order and was respected by the Pagal Panthis as "Pīr-Mātā".

== Career ==
It is said that the Pagal Panthis were composed mostly of tribes like Garos, Hajongs and Hudis.

Tipu Shah led a rebellion against the zamindars (landlords) who collected the taxes for British East India Company. The zamindars had imposed heavy taxations on the peasant class, which served as the main cause of the rebellion. The zamindars themselves were paying taxes to the East India company, which raised the taxes after the First Anglo-Burmese War. The rebellion succeeded in the establishment of an independent administration ruled by Tipu Shah in the Sherpur territory of Mymensingh. Beginning in the name of Allah, he collected minimum taxes to run the administration and called for the construction of a mud-fortress known as Garh-Jarip, which functioned as his capital city. He appointed Bakshu Sarkar as the State Judge, Gumanu as the State Collector and Jarip Pagal among others as faujdars. Ultimately, the Company army and police along with local zamindars were able to suppress the rebellion and imprison him on 7 December 1824. Two days later however, he was released on bail. He was arrested for a second time in the same month and was again released on bail on 17 December. In early January 1825, Tipu Shah was trialled and sentenced to lifetime imprisonment.

== Death and legacy ==
Tipu Shah died in jail in 1852, after spending 27 years imprisoned. Following his imprisonment in 1825, the Pagal Panthi Order for another ten years under the leadership of Dubraj Pathor and Janku Pathor.
