= Muhammad Amin Khan Turani =

Grand Vizier of the Mughal Empire from 1720 to 1721

Chin Muhammad Khan Muhammad Amin Khan
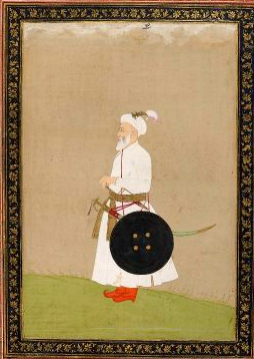
- Amīn Khān

Sadr-us-Sudur of the Mughal Empire
- In office 1698–?
- Monarch: Aurangzeb

Vazīr-i-Āzam of the Mughal Empire
- In office 1720 – 28 January 1721
- Monarch: Muhammad Shah
- Succeeded by: Nizam-ul-Mulk, Asaf Jah I

Subahdar of Gujarat
- Monarch: Aurangzeb
- Preceded by: Jaswant Singh
- Succeeded by: Mukhtar Khan

Personal details
- Died: 28 January 1721
- Relations: Abid Khan (uncle); Ghaziuddin Khan (cousin); Chin Qilich Khan (nephew)
- Children: Qamaruddin Khan
- Parent: Mir Bahauddin

Military service
- Allegiance: Mughal Empire
- Years of service: 1690s-1721
- Commands: Mughal Army
- Battles/wars: Mughal-Maratha war; Battle of Torna (1704); Banda Singh Bahadur's uprising; Battle of Jammu (1712); Siege of Gurdaspur (1715)

Mian Muhammad Amin Khan Turani (died 28 January 1721) was a Mughal noble of Central Asian origin. He served as sadr-us-sudur (head of religious endowments) during the reign of Mughal emperor Aurangzeb, and briefly occupied the post of wazir (prime minister) during the reign of Muhammad Shah. He was the uncle of Chin Qilich Khan, the first Nizam of Hyderabad.

== Early life ==
Muhammad Amin Khan originated from Samarqand, in the kingdom of Bukhara. His father was Mir Bahauddin, the second son of Alam Shaikh, a scholar and descendant of renowned saint Shihabuddin Suhrawardi. Mir Bahauddin served the Khan of Bukhara, and was executed by him around 1686-1687 out of suspicion. Muhammad Amin Khan fled the region and in 1687, arrived in India.

== Career ==
Upon arrival in India, Muhammad Amin Khan was received by Mughal emperor Aurangzeb in the Deccan. He was made a Mughal noble through the grant of a mansab, and distinguished himself in several military campaigns, initially serving under his cousin Ghaziuddin Khan. During Aurangzeb's reign, Muhammad Amin Khan belonged to one of the court's two leading factions of nobles. This faction was led by his prominent relatives, namely cousin Ghaziuddin Khan and nephew Chin Qilich Khan. In 1698, Muhammad Amin was appointed sadr-us-sudur of the empire (head of religious endowments) by Aurangzeb. Shortly before Aurangzeb's death, Muhammad Amin was awarded the title of 'Chin Muhammad Khan'.

Following Aurangzeb's death, Muhammad Amin collaborated with Chin Qilich Khan to remain neutral in the ensuing war of succession between the princes. However, disagreeing with Chin Qilich Khan's policy of withdrawal from the court, he maintained a political presence in future years. During the reign of emperor Bahadur Shah, he was one of several nobles dispatched to combat the uprising of the Sikhs led by Banda Singh Bahadur, but failed to succeed; he would then abandon the task of capturing Banda upon Bahadur Shah's death. He later sought the support of the Sayyid brothers to grab power with the ascent of emperor Farrukhsiyar - however, starting in the year 1716, he conspired against them, contributing to their deposition and the coronation of new emperor Muhammad Shah. Under Muhammad Shah, Muhammad Amin Khan was awarded the coveted post of wazir (prime minister), to the dismay of Chin Qilich Khan who had wanted it for himself. However, Muhammad Amin Khan enjoyed only a short tenure of four months before a premature death, following which Chin Qilich Khan received the post of wazir. The 1821 travelogue Sair-ul-Manazil mentions Muhammad Amin Khan's tomb being located behind the Ghaziuddin Khan Madrasa in Delhi.

== Family ==
Muhammad Amin Khan had several relatives in the Mughal nobility. Muhammad Amin's uncle was Abid Khan, who once held the position of sadr-us-sudur under Aurangzeb. This made Muhammad Amin first cousins with Ghaziuddin Khan, son of Abid Khan and leading noble of Aurangzeb. Muhammad Amin was hence uncle to Ghaziuddin Khan's son Chin Qilich Khan, another prominent noble in the Mughal court (who went on to found the Asaf Jahi dynasty of Hyderabad).

Muhammad Amin Khan himself had a son named Qamaruddin Khan, who would also serve as wazir. Muhammad Amin Khan's sister was married to the Mughal governor of Lahore Abd al-Samad Khan, and his daughter was married to the latter's son Zakariya Khan.
