= Laxmisagar =

Neighbourhood in Bhubaneswar, Odisha, India also known as the heart of Bhubaneswar

- Neighbourhood
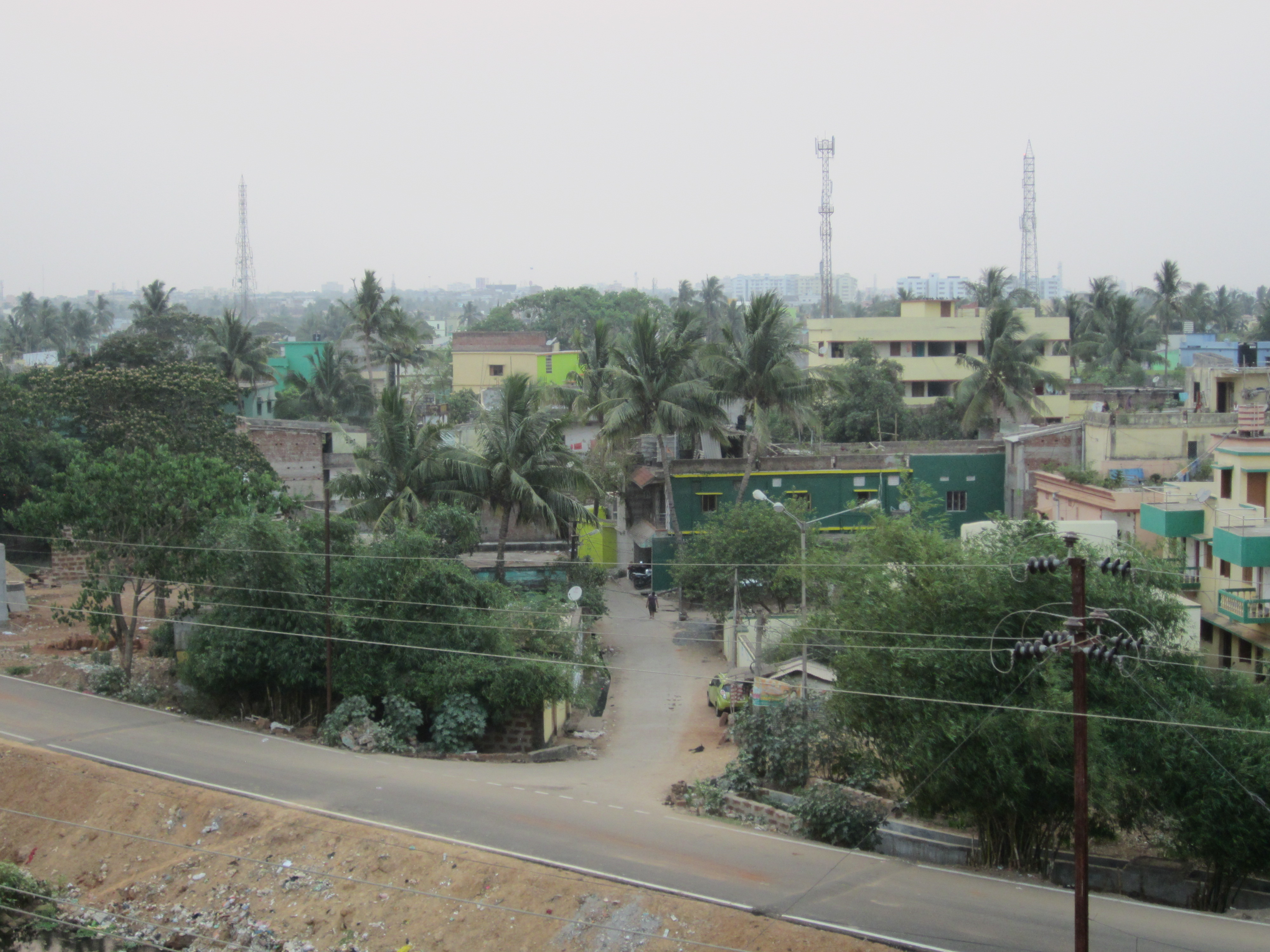
- Interactive map of Laxmisagar
- Coordinates: 20.2685°N 85.8485°E
- Country: India
- State: Odisha
- City: Bhubaneswar
- PIN Code: 751006

Laxmisagar (ଲକ୍ଷ୍ମୀସାଗର) is a famous place in Bhubaneswar, the capital of Odisha, India. Etymologically the name is derived from the words "Laxmi", meaning the Hindu Goddess of Wealth, and "Sagar", which in Sanskrit means the sea or ocean. Laxmisagar is famous for the Central Jail, which is one of the biggest jails in Odisha. Many big names, including well-known political prisoners and notorious criminals, have spent time in the Central Jail at Laxmisagar. The open space in front of the jail has been used for film shooting, where numerous famous imprisonment and jail-break scenes have been filmed for a great number of Oriya movies.

== Major landmarks ==
Apart from the central jail, the other major landmarks of Laxmisagar are the Central Institute of Indian Languages - Eastern Chapter (popularly known as the Eastern Regional Language Centre) and the Gram Sevika (anganwadi) Taalim Kendra (Lady Village Workers' Training Centre), both of which are located in peaceful idyllistic sylvan surrounding. The Language Centre imparts training in translation and comparative linguistics in various eastern Indian languages such as Odia, Bengali, Assamese and Santali and local dialects of Orissa, West Bengal, Bihar and the North-eastern states of India. It is a place of scholastic research where eminent translators and linguists from all over India commingle to share their knowledge.

The Gram Sevika Taalim Kendra at Laxmisagar is the largest of its kind in Orissa. It provides residential accommodation and training facility to hundreds of rural women, including tribal ladies, at a time.

The Gokulananda Maharathi Law College (affiliated under Utkal University) has also a campus inside the Laxmisagar Municipal Highschool compound. The Regional Traffic Training Institute is also situated in Laxmisagar, where the headquarters of the Seventh Battalion of Orissa Armed Forces was located.

== Places of interest ==
Laxmisagar is situated on the Cuttack-Puri main road between Rasulgarh square and Kalpana square. It is well known for its meat market and abattoir, people from all over Bhubaneswar come here to purchase good quality mutton. The famous temples in and around Laxmisagar are the Maa Dalakhai temple, Hanuman temple, Sriram temple, Trinath Temple, patitapabana temple and LaxmiNarayan temple, Adisakti temple, maa duladei temple, Nilakantheswar temple, sanischara templeBuddheswari temple. The Bhubaneswar Stock Exchange was also situated in Laxmisagar near Cuttack Road.

== Famous personalities ==
The famous Odia film stars Bijoy Mohanty and Jayaraj (Jayee) have resided here. The eminent writer and compiler of Gyanamandal (the famous Oriya encyclopaedia), Binod Kanungo compiled his magnum opus at the Eastern Regional Language Centre in Laxmisagar.

== See also ==
- Bhubaneswar
- Ratikant Kanungo
