= Kilich Khan =

Ruler and military commander in Mughal empire (d. 1687)

Kilich Khan Bahadur کلیچ خان بہادر
- Quran-i-Habib; Azim Khan; Kilich Khan; Bahadur; Nawab
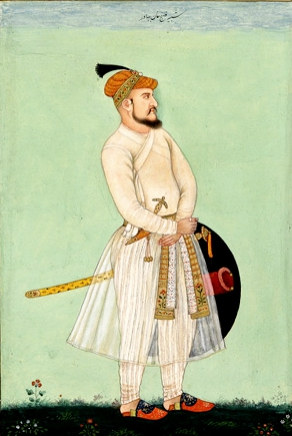
- Kilich Khan

Governor of Ajmer
- Tenure: 1667 – 1672

Governor of Multan
- Tenure: 1672 – 1676

Amir-i-Haj
- Tenure: 1676 – 1680

Sadar-i-Qul
- Tenure: 1681 – 1685

Military Commander of Zafarabad
- Command: 1686 – 1687
- Mughal Emperor: Alamgir I
- Born: 17th Century; Adilabad, Samarqand, Khanate of Bukhara (present day Uzbekistan)
- Died: 1687 AD; Hyderabad
- Burial: Dargah Khalij Khan, Himyat Sagar Deccan, Mughal Empire (present day Hyderabad, Telangana, India)
- Children: Ghazi ud-Din Khan Feroze Jung I
Names
- Nawab Khawaja Abid Siddiqi Kilich Khan ibn Khawaja Ismail Khan
- Father: Khawaja Alam Shaikh
- Religion: Sunni Islam

Nawab Khawaja Abid Khan Siddiqi (b. 17th century – 1687), better known as Kilich Khan, was a Nawab and military general under Mughal Emperor Aurangzeb.

== Biography ==
Kilich Khan was born in Aliabad near the ancient Silk Road city of Samarkand. His father, Khawaja Alam Shaikh Siddiqi, was a direct descendant of scholar Shihab al-Din 'Umar al-Suhrawardi of Sohrevard in Iran. Through his ancestor, Suhrawardi, Kilich Khan traced his ancestry back to Abu Bakr, the first Caliph.

Kilich Khan broke his family tradition and became a warrior rather than a scholar although he was well-versed in Islamic theology and Persian language. Kilich Khan is known to have utilised the composite bow and arrow, he kept the Quran attached to his quiver and rode along with a Crescent standard and a yellow flag.

Historian Henry Briggs wrote,

In youth he was trained to the use of the bow, the spear and the sword. Riding on horseback was familiar to him from the moment he could toddle alone from his mother's knee as it is to this day to everybody from the plains of Arabia to the hills of Afghanistan and he was specially taught to regard the cause of the Crescent and the Quran as the great purpose of his existence.

It was in 1655 that Kilich Khan undertook a pilgrimage to Mecca. But on his way there he stopped off in Hindustan to present himself before Mughal Emperor Shah Jahan. The Mughal Emperor bestowed on Kilich Khan a Khilat or dress of honour and promised him that after he returned from Mecca he could take up a post on his personal staff.

He was promoted to Sadar-i-Qul ( Supt. of Endowments ) 1681 - 1685, Subedar of Ajmer 1667–1672, Subedar of Multan 1672–1676, Amir-i-Haj 1676–1680. Faujdar of Zafarabad ( Bidar ) 1686–1687. Granted the title of Azim Khan 1657, and Qilich Khan Bahadur 1680.

=== Later life ===
He returned from his pilgrimage to Mecca in Arabia to India in 1658 to take up his post serving the Emperor Shah Jahan, only to find that the Emperor had been taken ill and so Kilich Khan decided to throw his lot in with Prince Aurangzeb. Taking command of one of the Mughal armies, Kilich Khan played a crucial role in the Battle of Samugarh. For this, he was rewarded by being made Sadr-us-sudur (President of Presidents) and one of the Emperor's most trusted generals.

He then proceeded to follow Aurangzeb around India as the Emperor pursued his dream of bringing all of Hindustan under one Flag. Many battles were fought and many Forts besieged but it was during the Siege of Golconda in 1687 that Kilich Khan shone through as the Emperors most loyal and courageous general. Kilich Khan accompanied Aurangzeb laying siege twice, first in 1686 which ended in failure, thus continued with the second attempt in 1687. In this campaign, Aurangzeb's army were under the command of Kilich Khan's son Ghazi ud-Din Khan Feroze Jung.

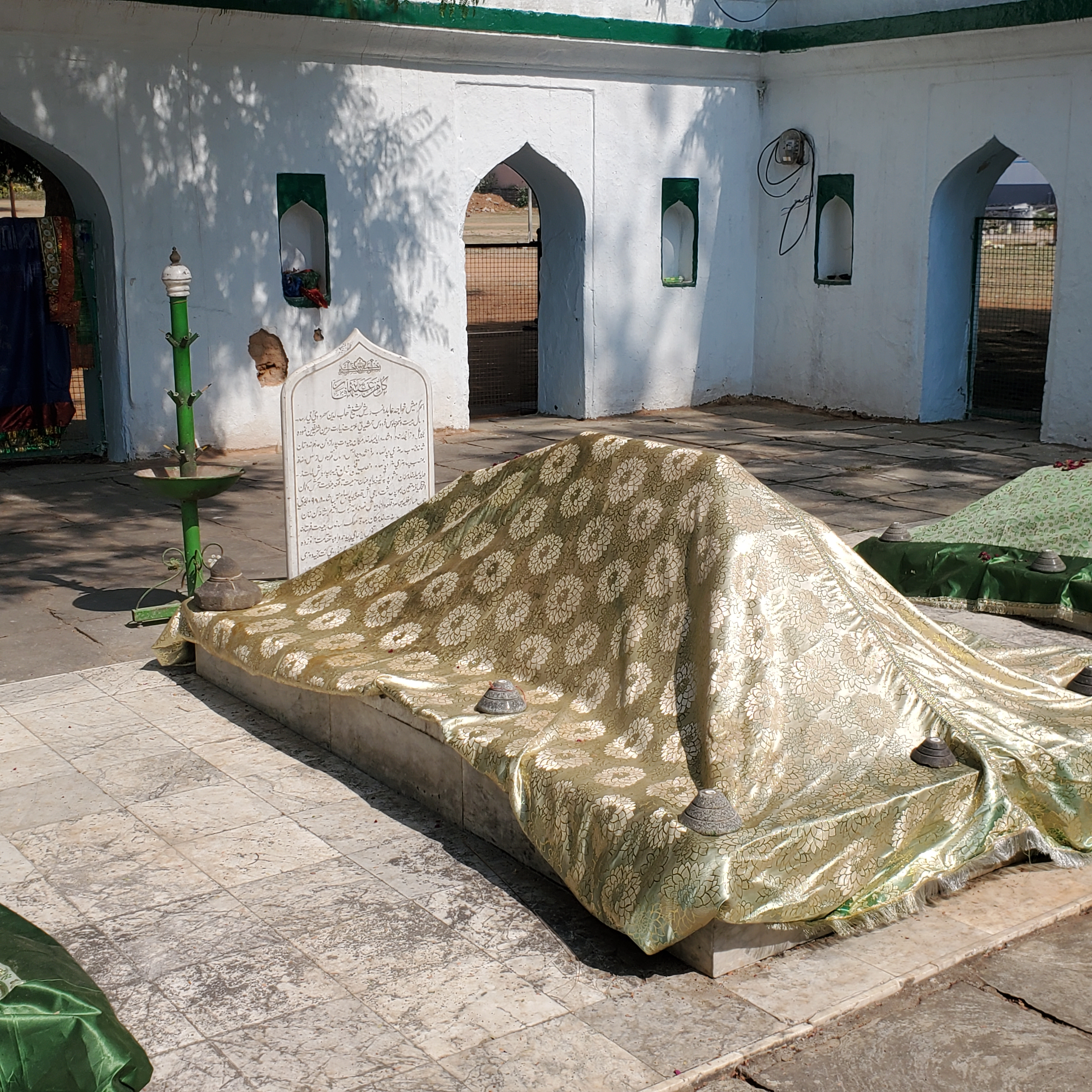
Tomb of Khwaja Abid Qilich Khan Suhrevardi, located near Himayat Sagar.

Ghazi ud-Din Khan Feroze Jung was so keen on taking the fort that in a sudden assault, he sent his father in charge of the storming party. However, Kilich Khan was hit by the shrapnel of a powerful cannonball, the bombardment which completely severed his arm. He returned to the Mughal camp on his horse refusing to dismount. Aurangzeb's Vizier-e-Azam (prime minister), Asad Khan noticed that while the surgeons were busy taking bits of bone and iron from his wound, he was stoically sipping coffee. Kilich Khan died a few days later, his arm was also found identified by the signet ring he always wore on his finger. Kilich Khan is buried in a tomb at Kismatpur near Himayat Sagar only a few Kilometers from where he had died at Golconda in Hyderabad, Telangana, India. An identifying panel was placed at the tomb by the Nizam's private estate Sarf-e-Khas in 1942, to recognize the dynasty's ancestor.

At the time of his death, Kilich Khan held the position as governor of Bijapur under Mughal empire.

== Family ==
He was the father of the Mughal general Ghazi ud-Din Khan Feroze Jung I and the grandfather of Mir Qamar-ud-din Siddiqi, Asaf Jah I. His nephew, Muhammad Amin Khan Turani, son of his younger brother Mir Burhanuddin, also rose to high positions. His other descendants include Nawab Khwaja Hamid Khan Bahadur Siddiqi, Nawab Rahim Chin Kilich Khan Bahadur Siddiqi, two sons who died young and Khadija Begum Sahiba as well as another daughter who married to Nawab Riyat Khan Bahadur.

== Ranks ==
- 1000 zat (infantry, meaning that he had been granted lands that would provide 1000 infantry in times of battle) Granted in 1655 by Emperor Shah Jahan.
- 3000 zat and 500 sowar in 1657 (sowar were cavalry troops) Granted by Emperor Aurangzeb.
- 4000 zat and 700 sowar in 1658
- 4000 zat and 1500 sowar in 1665
- 5000 zat and 1500 sowar in 1681

== See also ==
- Hyderabad State
- Nizam
- Asaf Jahi dynasty

== Bibliography ==
- Zubrzycki, John. (2006) The Last Nizam: An Indian Prince in the Australian Outback. Pan Macmillan, Australia. ISBN 978-0-330-42321-2.
