= Battle of Torna =

Battle in 1704

Date	1704
Location	Torna
Result	Mughal victory

Belligerents
Maratha Kingdom	Mughal Empire

Commanders and leaders
Unknown	Muhammad Amin Khan Turani; Tarbiyat Khan

The Battle of Torna was fought on between the Mughal Empire and the Maratha Kingdom. The Mughal emperor, Aurangzeb, ordered a siege Torna Fort. His commanders, Muhammad Amin Khan Turani and Tarbiyat Khan, defeated the Maratha occupants. In recognition of the difficult defences the Mughals had to overcome to capture this fort, Aurangzeb renamed it as Futulgaib.
