= Ratikant Kanungo =

Ratikanta Kanungo is an entrepreneur, builder, educationist, media baron and film producer of Odisha, India. He is also a notorious financial fraudster. Coming from a poor lower-middle-class family, he rose to quick fortunes in real estate business, becoming managing director of the Shibani Estates and Promoters Pvt Ltd. He produced a number of Oriya movies and also established a chain of schools and colleges. In May 2013 he drew media attention following the Central Bureau of Investigation exposure of his involvement in the multi-million rupees scam involving fraudulent gold loan availed from Odisha Gramya Bank by mortgaging fake jewellery. He was sentenced to judicial custody.

== Early life and education ==
Kanungo spent major part of his student career at Laxmisagar in Bhubaneswar. Although an average student, he had a natural gift of building social networks. He was educated at the Laxmisagar Municipal Highschool and BJB College Bhubaneswar. Initially he took Physics for his graduation, but dropped it after one year to take up the study of Economics. He obtained his post graduate degree in economics from the Ravenshaw University.

== Realtor career ==
After his post graduation in Economics, Kanungo joined a real estate company as trainee field officer. He rose rapidly through the ranks and within two years he floated his own company, Shibani Estate and Promoters Ltd. By 2008, he had become a premier real estate developer of Odisha, winning the State Youth Entrepreneur Award.

== Career in media and film industry ==
Kanungo has produced four Oriya feature films and a number of music albums. The movies produced by him include the successful "Rakhi Bandhili Mo Rakhiba Mana" (2006), which won the ETV Film Award in 2011. On June 17, 2016, the Utkal Cine Chamber of Commerce announced that they would no longer provide any services or support to Kanungo due to fraud charges against him. The Central Board of Film Certification requires certification from the Utkal Cine Chamber of Commerce before considering any movie produced in Odisha.

Kanungo founded the Oriya daily newspaper "Ananya" in 2012, and he also became the editor.

== Career as educationist ==
Kanungo set up the Sai Shibani International School in 2011 and became its founder chairman. He also set up the Shibani Institute of Technological Education (SITE) and also the Sai Coaching Institute for the medical and engineering entrance test aspirants. However, a CBI investigation in May 2013 exposed the fact that these educational institutions had been built through fraudulent bank loan availed by mortgaging fake gold jewellery. The mega fraud was a setback for the Shibani group of educational institutions.

== Involvement in bank fraud and land fraud ==
Kanungo was involved in the multi-crore Odisha Gramya Bank gold loan scam. With the help of close associates and corrupt bank officials, he defrauded the bank of Rs 130 million in March 2013 by pledging fake aluminium jewellery as "gold" mortgage. His modus operandi was similar to that of Harshad Mehta of the 1992 Mumbai stock market scam. Kanungo would avail of huge amounts of bank loan by mortgaging fake jewellery and purchase huge tracts of land through the loan. He would repay the loan after reselling the land at sky high prices. He raised hundreds of crores of rupees of bank loan by mortgaging the same fake jewellery 280 times in five years. His bullish activities in real estate was chiefly responsible for skyrocketing property prices in Bhubaneswar. The mega scam was exposed in May 2013 when the head office of Odisha Gramya Bank conducted enquiry into the unusual gold loan transactions at their Dumuduma branch with the help of the Central Bureau of Investigation. On 31 May 2013 CBI confirmed the direct involvement of Ratikant Kanungo in the mega fraud.

In August 2013 and again in December 2015, Kanungo was arrested for fraudulent transactions in which he would take money on the pretence of a land sale, but not transfer any real estate to the buyer.
