= Kanungo =

Kanungo is a surname. Notable people with the name include:

- Arjun Kanungo (born 1990), Indian singer, composer, recording artist, music producer, entrepreneur
- Binod Kanungo (1912–1990), Odia author, freedom fighter, Gandhian, educator, social reformer
- Hemchandra Kanungo (1871–1951), Indian nationalist and a member of the Anushilan Samiti
- Jahar Kanungo, Indian film and documentary director and producer in Bengali
- Madhu Sudan Kanungo (1927–2011), Indian scientist in the field of gerontology and neuroscience
- Nityanand Kanungo (1900–1988), Indian politician from the state of Odisha
- Ratikant Kanungo, entrepreneur, builder, educationist, media baron, film producer
- Rituparna Kanungo, Indian Canadian experimental nuclear physicist
- Sheila Kanungo, Indian sport shooter
- Trilochan Kanungo (1940–2023), Indian politician
