= Sadr-us-sudur (Mughal Empire) =

Religious minister of the Mughal Empire

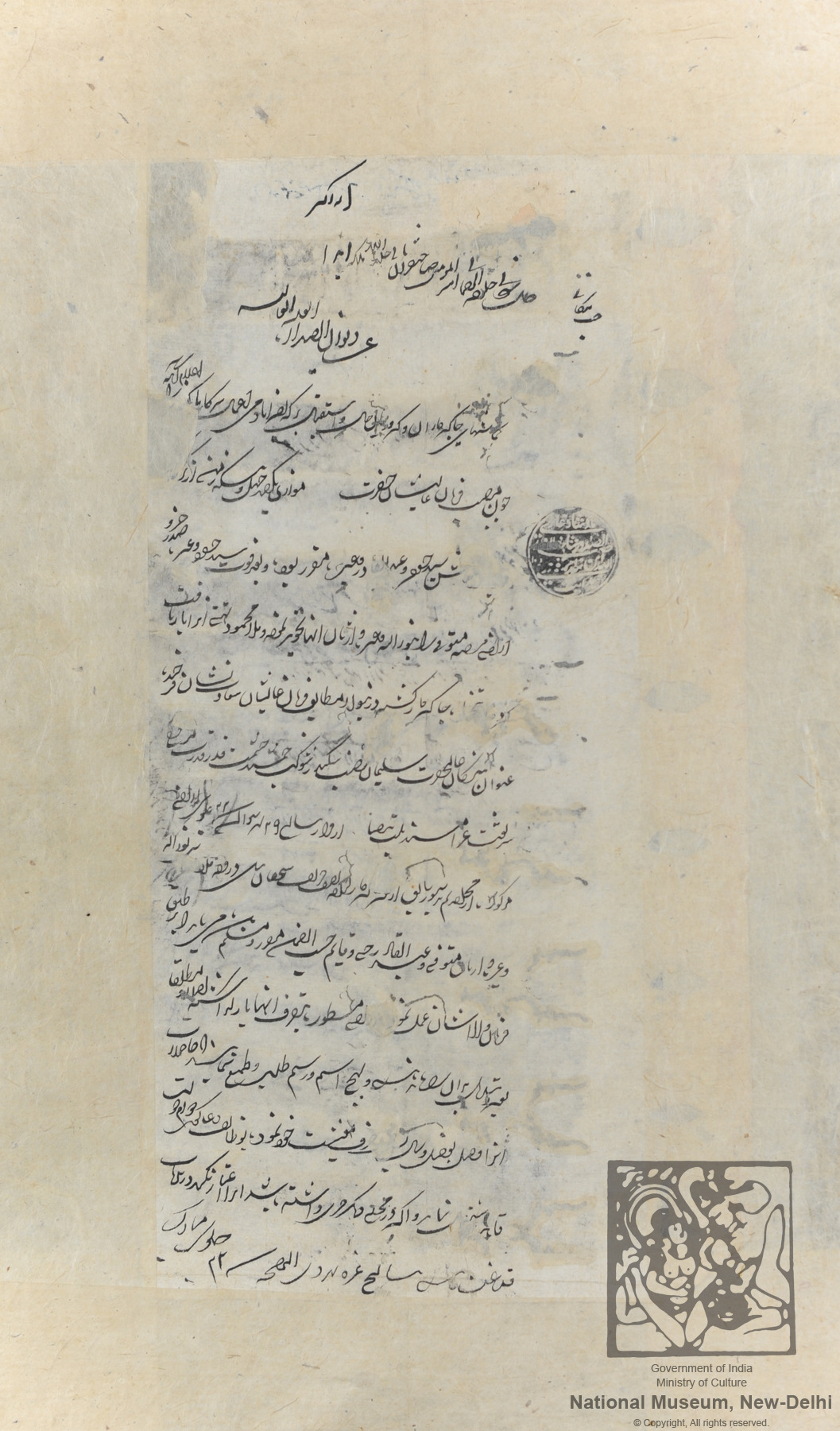
A farman (imperial decree) concerning a Saiyid's subsistence grant, bearing the seal of Hidayat Allah, sadr-us-sudur of Shah Jahan, 1649 CE

The Sadr-us-sudur (lit. 'sadr of the sadrs') was a central minister of the Mughal Empire and its chief religious dignitary. They were responsible for the management of religious endowments to Islamic institutions as well as the appointment of key individuals in the judicial system. The role was inherited from the politico-religious systems of pre-Mughal polities such as the Delhi Sultanate and the Timurids. The title was formally instituted by the Mughal emperor Akbar, and grew in importance under later rulers. As a chief religious dignitary and representative of the ulama, the sadr-us-sudur found parallels in other parts of the Islamic world, like the Shaykh al-Islam of the Ottoman Empire.

== History ==
=== Pre-Mughal origins ===
The term sadr, literally meaning a leader or chief, had its religious and political meaning evolve over several centuries in the Persianate Islamic world, and most generically referred to notable Islamic theologians and scholars in a polity. The intensified title sadr-us-sudur (lit. 'sadr of the sadrs') found use in Bukhara by a prominent line of religious scholars as early as the Karakhanid era (around 1000 CE). The idea of a chief imperial official who oversaw religious administration (alongside the qazi-ul-quzzat or chief judge) crystallized under the Timurids around the 14th century, with the title sadr; the title sadr-us-sudur was itself not often used.

The sadr-us-sudur was well-established in the Delhi Sultanate as one of the main figures in the central administration, in charge of religious affairs, endowments, and education. The individual in this office often dually served as the chief justice (qazi-ul-quzzat). Annemarie Schimmel asserts that the office was instituted by the sultan Alauddin Khilji, a century after Iltutmish established a precursor office called shaykh al-Islam.

=== Developments under the Mughals ===
The first Mughal rulers, Babur and Humayun, inherited the office of sadr-us-sudur from the Delhi Sultanate unchanged in its political and religious role. In the 1530s, Bairam Khan on behalf of Humayun appointed an Indian Muslim cleric and poet named Shaikh Gadai Kamboh to the office, which enjoyed high influence. The most powerful officeholder took charge when emperor Akbar appointed Abdul Nabi to this office around 1565. Abdul Nabi was an Indian Muslim and came from a prominent family of the ulama, the grandson of eminent Sufi Abdul Quddus Gangohi. As the sadr-us-sudr Abdul Nabi was the spokesperson for Sunni Islam in religious debates that Akbar organized, as well as the intermediary between the emperor and the ulama, managing their relationship and representing the views of the latter. His chief responsibility was in granting religious endowments and charities, through which he exercised great authority over the Islamic gentry. Akbar seems to have been initially open to deferring to Abdul Nabi on religious and judicial matters, and contemporary historian Badauni notes that Abdul Nabi enjoyed the most power of any other in the role during Akbar's rule. However, Abdul Nabi's traditionalist views conflicted with Akbar's more liberal outlook on kingship and religion; the former executed some Shia literati in the court and in 1577, executed a Brahmin over a case of blasphemy.

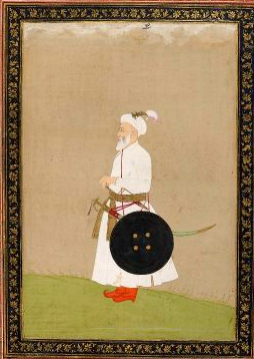
Portrait of Muhammad Amin Khan, a sadr-us-sudur of Aurangzeb's reign.

This event was a contributing factor in the subsequent weakening of the sadr-us-sudr. In 1578, Akbar introduced the office of the provincial (subah) sadr to curtail the direct influence of the chief sadr. In addition, the court's scholars and Abdul Nabi himself were made to sign an imperial decree granting the Mughal emperor the authority to deliver justice on religious matters. After these changes, the sadr-us-sudur was frequently rotated by the emperor, and no other officeholder enjoyed as much authority as did Abdul Nabi. Historian Athar Ali notes that the title of sadr-us-sudur was institutionalized around 1580 when Akbar introduced administrative reforms by dividing the empire into provinces.

After his accession, Akbar's successor Jahangir took efforts to reestablish imperial relations with the ulama, among which was the appointment of Miran Sadr-i-Jahan Pihani as sadr-us-sudur; the latter had served Jahangir in his princely days and had ties to the conservative parts of the Islamic gentry. This appointment was viewed positively by the ulama.

Later Mughal rulers oversaw the sadr-us-sudur becoming a more notable member of the Mughal nobility (mansabdar), and having increased authority over the appointment of qazis (judges). During the reign of emperor Shah Jahan, the rank of the sadr-us-sudur increased to 4000 zat. At the time of his death, Khwaja Abid Khan, chief sadr of emperor Aurangzeb, held a rank of 5000. Shah Jahan's reign also saw the sadr-us-sudur cease to dually hold the office of chief justice (qazi-ul-quzzat) in the mid-17th century, with the latter delegated to a separate officeholder.

== Functions ==
The sadr-us-sudur of the Mughal Empire was one of its central ministers, the chief of religious endowments. The individual appointed was usually a Sunni Muslim theologian, though rank-holding salaried military officials (mansabdars) were appointed to this office as well. Though most offices of Mughal government had a bias for appointments of Iranians, the sadr-us-sudur was often an Indian or Turani (Central Asian) Muslim, possibly since Iranians tended to Shiism. The primary role of this office was to manage madad-i-ma'ash (land grants) and wazifa (cash grants) endowed to families of the ulama for their subsistence. The purpose of this was to cultivate scholars who could go on to serve in the Mughal administration as qazis (judges) and muftis (jurists). The sadr-us-sudur also recommended appointments for these positions to the emperor. With Akbar's reforms, the sadr-us-sudur also increasingly gained the ability to issue grants and appointments to non-Muslims.

As the chief religious dignitary of the empire, several officials were suboordinate to the sadr-us-sudur. The foremost was the qazi-ul-quzzat (chief justice). The imperial muhtasib was also a suboordinate. The sadr-us-sudur was responsible for managing the sub-imperial sadrs who performed similar functions to the chief sadr at the level of the subah.

The office of the sadr-us-sudur had parallel roles in Safavid and Qajar Iran, and a similar position titled Shaykh al-Islam existed in other polities such as Mamluk Egypt and the Ottoman Empire.
