= Shaikh Abdul Nabi =

Sadr-us-sudur of the Mughal Empire
- Succeeded by: Sultan Khwaja

Personal life
- Born: Gangoh, Mughal India
- Died: 1583/1584
- Notable idea: islah (traditionalist reform)
- Notable work(s): Sunan al-hudā fī mutābaʿat al-Muṣṭafā; Wāẓāʾif al-Nabī

Religious life
- Religion: Sunni Islam
- Teachers: Ibn Hajar al-Haytami

Shaikh Abdul Nabi (d. 1583/1584), also transliterated Abd al-Nabi, was a leading Islamic scholar and theologian of 16th-century Mughal India during the reign of emperor Akbar. He served as sadr-us-sudur (chief of religious endowments), the highest religious office of the Mughal Empire, before losing imperial favour. Though his family was known to be followers of Sufism, he was a proponent of Islamic traditionalism (islah). He is credited with authoring some theological works and building a mosque in Delhi, which still stands.

== Early life ==
Abdul Nabi was born in Gangoh, the grandson of eminent Indian Sufi Abdul Quddus Gangohi. Through his grandfather, he was considered descended from Abu Hanifa. His heritage made him part of one of the most prominent families in the ulama (Islamic scholarly community). He was raised in Gangoh where he studied Islamic jurisprudence, then travelled to Mecca and Medina to study the hadith under traditionalists such as Ibn Hajar al-Haytami through whom he was exposed to ideas of islah (traditionalist reform). Upon his return, he held views critical of his family's Sufi traditions, and wrote a refutal of his father's treatise on the Sufi practice of sama; this ostracized him from the family.

== Career ==
Abdul Nabi was appointed to the Mughal court by Akbar, his renunciation of Sufism having garnered him a reputation as a knowledgeable scholar. Around 1563 he was appointed sadr-us-sudur of the Mughal Empire by Akbar, on the recommendation of prime minister Muzaffar Khan Turbati, giving him the power to manage religious grants to members of the Indian ulama. This was the highest religious office in the Mughal government, placing him as the spokesperson of Sunni Islam and the intermediary between the emperor and the ulama. Abdul Nabi's traditionalist views on Islam contrasted with the emperor's liberal views (sulh-i-kul), but the latter maintained a good relationship. Abdul Nabi was also appointed to tutor Akbar's son Salim (future emperor Jahangir) in hadith. Around 1575–1576, he constructed a mosque in Delhi that still stands. Historian Catherine Asher has posited that this structure served as a madrasa.

Abdul Nabi's views came at odds with Akbar's policies, as he had some Shia literati invited to the court executed for their beliefs, and frequently disputed with rival religious scholar Makhdum al-Mulk Abdullah Sultanpuri. At the zenith of these tensions with the emperor was Abdul Nabi's trial and execution of a Brahmin in 1577. The latter had allegedly misappropriated materials meant for building a mosque, and had cursed the Prophet Muhammad. The ulama were divided on whether the punishment should be execution or public humiliation along with a penalty. Abdul Nabi decided on execution without consulting the emperor and to the latter's subsequent disapproval. This ruling contributed to imperial concern on the level of autonomy granted to the ulama in a polity seeking to accommodate various non-Muslim communities.

In 1578, Akbar established a sadr in each province that reported directly to the emperor, rather to a central sadr, weakening the office. In 1579, Akbar issued a mahzar (attestation) that pronounced the precedence of the Mughal emperor's judgement over the rulings of jurists. The document had the unwilling signature of Abdul Nabi, along with other members of the ulama. Abdul Nabi's later objections to this move resulted in Akbar appointing him as amir al-hajj (leader of the Islamic pilgrimage), effectively exiling him to Mecca. A new sadr-us-sudur, Sultan Khwaja, was appointed in his stead. Around 1583/1584, Abdul Nabi returned to Mughal India and sought his former position with Akbar, who had him imprisoned on account of mismanagement of funds while in office. He was killed in prison by Akbar's order.

== Works ==
- Sunan al-hudā fī mutābaʿat al-Muṣṭafā - a work on Islamic prayer as per the hadith
- Wāẓāʾif al-Nabī - a work on ma'thur, or transmitted prayers
- Lost refutation against his father's treatise on Sufi sama
