= Majnu Shah =

Indian freedom fighter (died 1788)

Majnu Shah or Faqir Majnu Shah Burhan (died 1787) was a Pir (Sufi saint) of the Madariyya order from the Mewat region, who actively participated in, and commandeered the Fakir-Sannyasi Rebellion in Bengal, which, according to a number of scholars, was an early war for India's independence and joined in many battles against the British East India Company with his 'pious team'.

== Life ==
In the Battle of Udhuanala (1761) and the Battle of Buxar (1764), Majnu gathered a great number of Muslim faqirs and Hindu sannyasis against the East India Company who took complete power of Bengal by 1772.

His center was in Rangpur, Dinajpur and in Bogra District.

Majnu Shah was a faqir of the Madariya Sufi order founded by Syed Badiuduin Qutb-ul Shah Madar. His headquarters was at the shrine of Shah Madar in Makanpur near Kanpur. His first encounter with the British East India Company army on 25 February 1771 with the sepoys led by Lieutenant Feltham in Dinajpur was unsuccessful and he fled to the dargah at Mahasthangarh in Bogra district. He even managed to get a follower from Hindu zamindar family named Moti Giri or Moti Singh. In the winter of 1773, Majnu Shah and his team of faqirs reappeared in Rajshahi district and joined up with a body of sannyasis. On 23 December 1773 they had an encounter with the four companies of sepoys of the British East India Company army. The company army repulsed them again.

== Death ==
Majnu Shah sustained reverses while raiding the areas adjacent to Mymensingh in 1786 in a battle against the East India Company army under Lieutenant Brenan in Kaleswar area. He lost large number of his followers, and some of his wounded followers were carried to Mewat. After 1786 Majnu Shah was not found to lead any expedition. From a report of Lieutenant Brenan it is revealed that Majnu Shah was defeated and wounded in a battle on 8 December 1786. It is likely that with his wound he retired to the dargah of Shah Madar at Maqanpur in Cawnpur (Kanpur) district, where he is reported to have died on 26 January 1788.

After his death, his nephew Musa Shah led the faqirs and carried out attacks with muskets and rockets till he was killed in an encounter in 1792.

== See also ==
- Sannyasi rebellion
