= Badi' al-Din =

Founder of the Madariyya Silsila (1315–1434)

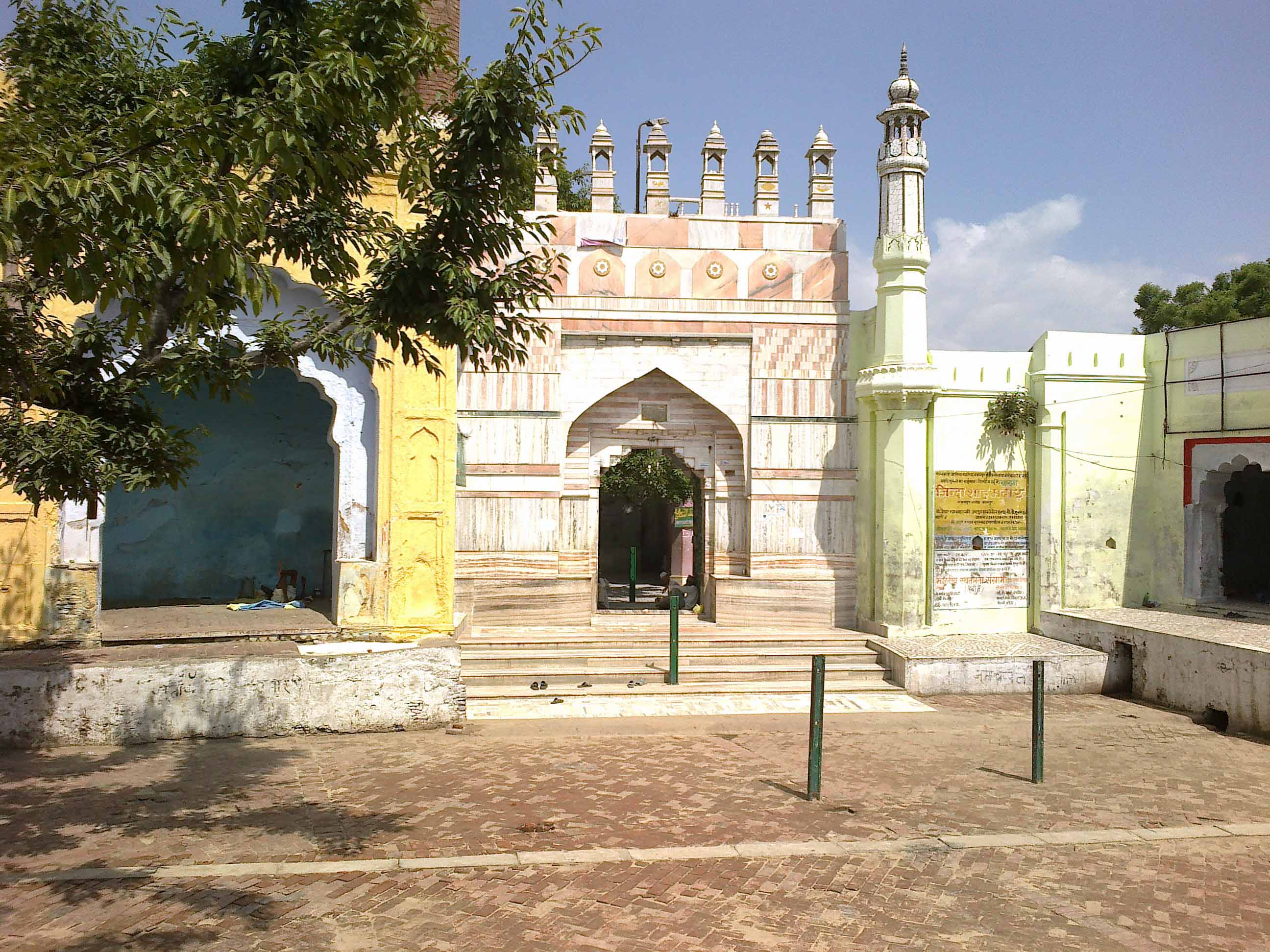
- Main gate of the shrine of Badi' al-Din

Personal life
- Born: Badi' al-Din; 1315 CE Aleppo, Syria
- Died: 1434 CE Makanpur, Kanpur, Uttar Pradesh, India
- Flourished: Islamic golden age

Religious life
- Religion: Islam
- Denomination: Sunni
- Order: Madariyya
- School: Hanafi
- Creed: Maturidi

Badīʿ al-Dīn, known as Shāh Madār, and by the title Qutb-ul-Madar (1315–1434), was a Syrian Sufi who migrated to India where he founded the Madariyya Sufi brotherhood. He is held in high esteem as a patron saint.

== Biography ==
Badi' al-Din hailed originally from Syria, and was born in Aleppo in 1315 CE. In later centuries, a growing number of legends arose about Badi' al-Din, which resulted in sources continuously backdating his year of birth. These same sources also disagree about Badi' al-Din's descent. Some state that he was a sayyid, that is, a descendant of the Islamic prophet Muhammad, and trace his descent back to Imam Ja'far al-Sadiq (died 765 CE). Others mention descent from Muhammad's companion (sahabi) Abu Hurayra, who died c. 678 CE. The assertion that Badi' al-Din was a Jew who had converted to Islam is not corroborated by other sources.

His teacher was Muḥammad Ṭayfūr Shāmī. After making a pilgrimage to Medina, he journeyed to India to spread Islam. He converted many Hindus to Islam in India, where he founded the Madariyya order. His tomb, built by order of Sultan Ibrahim Sharqi (r. 1402–40), is at Makanpur.
