= Makanpur =

- Town
- Location in Uttar Pradesh, India
- Coordinates: 26°54′8″N 79°58′41″E
- Country: India
- State: Uttar Pradesh
- District: Kanpur

Languages
  - Official: Hindi
- Time zone: UTC+5:30 (IST)
- Vehicle registration: UP-78

Makanpur (formerly known as Khairabad) is a town in Kanpur Nagar district in the state of Uttar Pradesh, India. Makanpur is a town in the tehsil of Bilhaur. Makanpur is well connected by rail and road. The nearest city to Makanpur is Araul, which is 4 km away.

It is also known for the dargah (shrine) of the Sufi saint of the Madariya Sufi order, Badiuddin Zinda Shah Madar. During his annual Urs celebrations, followers of the order congregate at the shrine.
