= Madariyya =

Indian Sufi mystic order in Islam

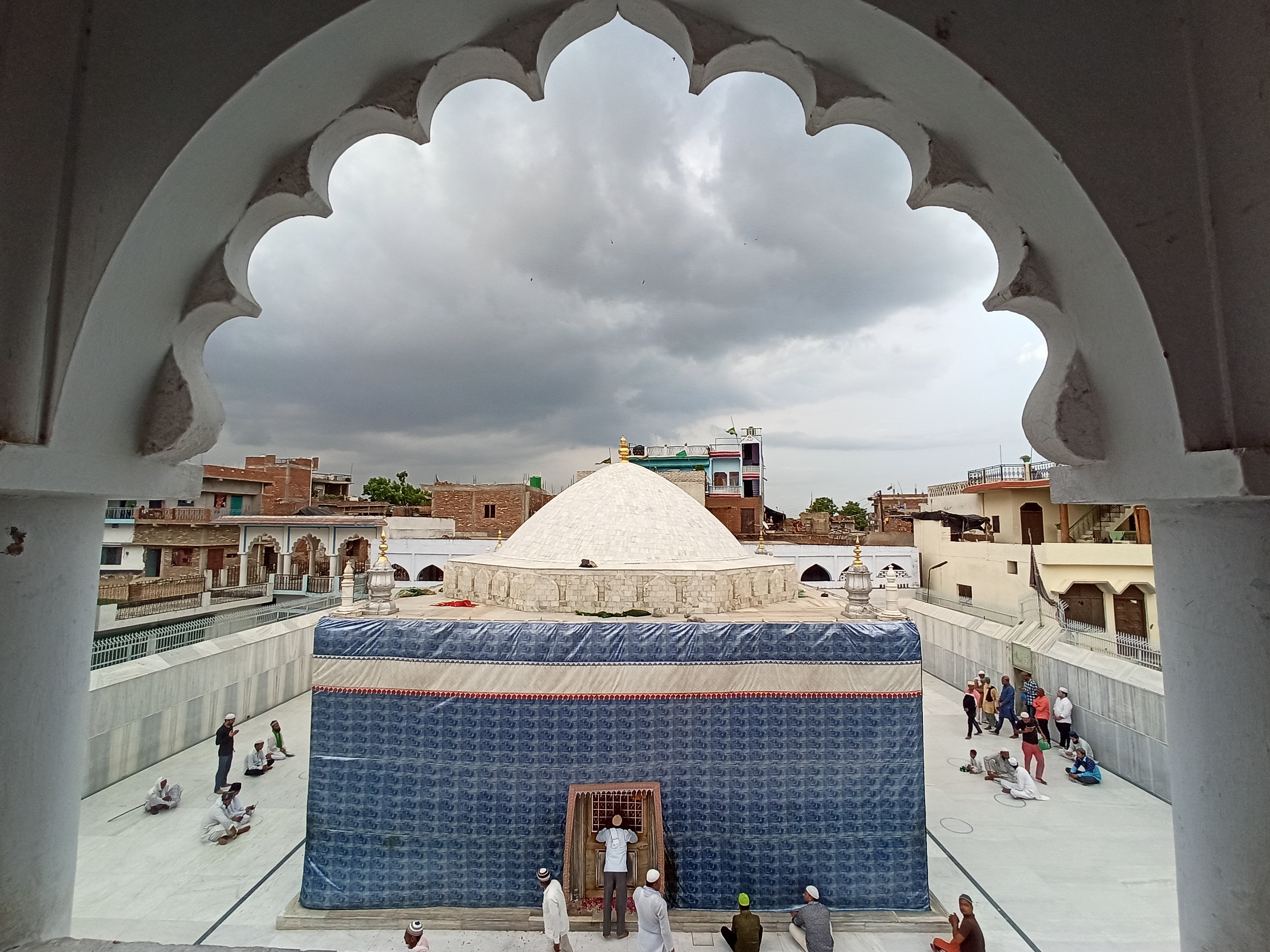
- The dargah of Qutbul Madar

Founder
- Shah Madar Badi' al-Din

Regions with significant populations
- North India, Nepal, Bangladesh

Religions
- Sufi Islam

The Madariyya is a Sufi order (tariqa) popular in North India, especially in Uttar Pradesh, the Mewat region, Bihar, Gujarat and West Bengal, as well as in Nepal and Bangladesh. Known for its syncretist beliefs and its focus on internal Dhikr, it was initiated by the Sufi saint Shah Madar Badi' al-Din and is centered on his shrine (Dargah) at Makanpur, Kanpur district, Uttar Pradesh.

The Madariyya order reached its zenith in the late Mughal period between the 15th and 17th centuries and gave rise to new orders as Shah Madar's disciples spread through the northern plains of India, into Bengal. As with most Sufi orders, its name Madariyya has been created by forming a Nisba from the name of its founder, (Shah) Madar, though it is sometimes also referred as Tabaqatiyya.

== See also ==
- Bayazid Tayfur Bastami
- Moinuddin Chishti
- Ashraf Jahangir Semnani
