= Paharganj =

- Neighbourhood of Delhi
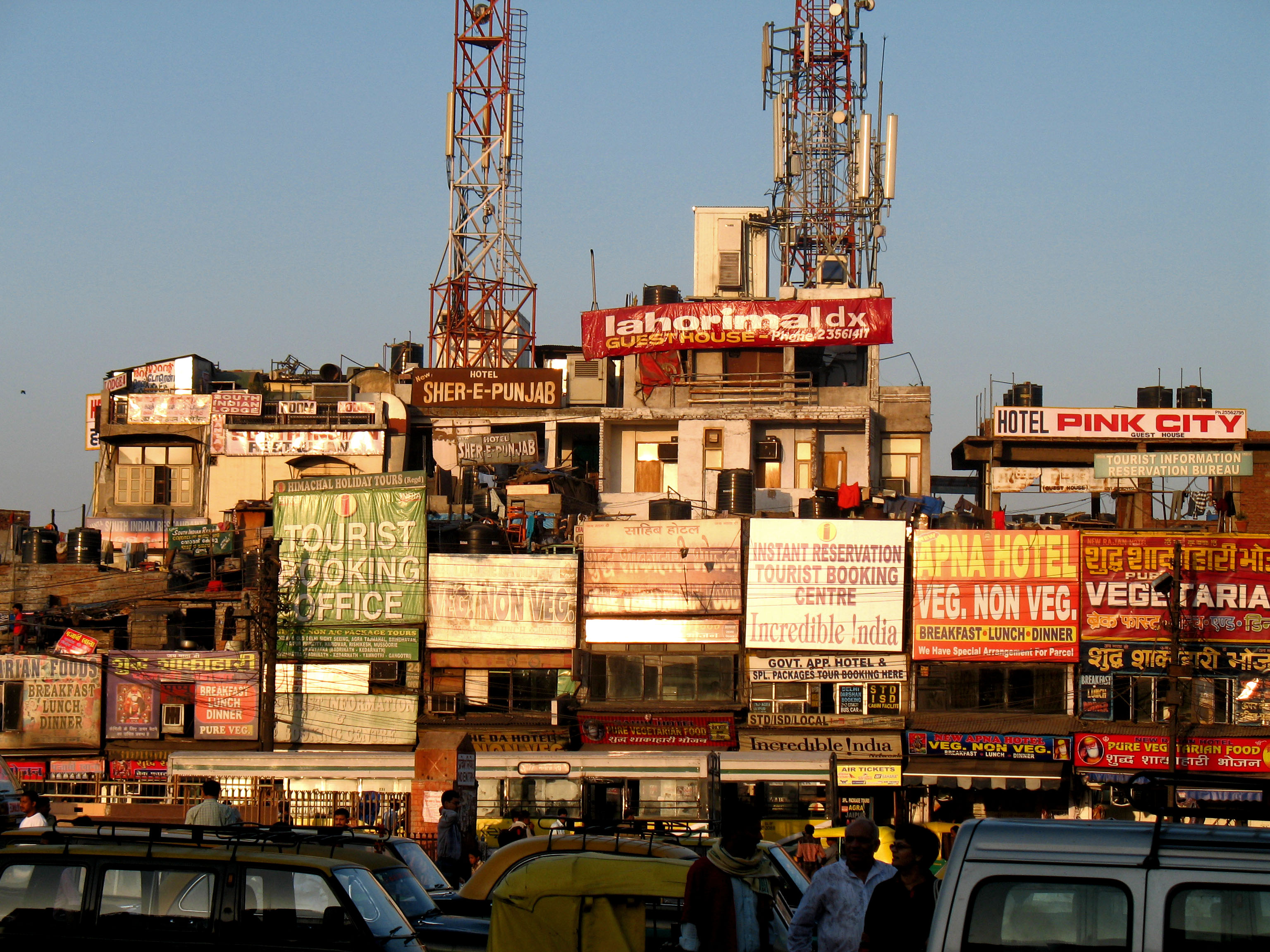
- Paharganj hotels and restaurants, across New Delhi Railway Station

- Location in Delhi, India
- Coordinates: 28°38′42″N 77°12′47″E
- Country: India
- State: Delhi
- District: Central Delhi

Government
  - Body: Municipal Corporation of Delhi

Languages
  - Official: Hindi, English
- Time zone: UTC+5:30 (IST)
- Lok Sabha constituency: New Delhi
- Vidhan Sabha constituency: Paharganj
- Civic agency: MCD

Paharganj (literally 'hilly neighbourhood') is a neighbourhood of Central Delhi, though it's close to New Delhi, located just west of the New Delhi Railway Station. Known as Shahganj or King's ganj or market place during Mughal era, it is one of the three administrative subdivisions of the Central Delhi district, within the National Capital Territory of Delhi, with the other two being Darya Ganj and Karol Bagh.

Known for its concentration of affordable hotels, lodges, restaurants, dhabas, and a wide variety of shops catering to both domestic travellers and foreign tourists, especially backpackers and low-budget travellers, it has become particularly popular as a haunt for international cuisine. However, Paharganj has a poor record regarding the safety of women since the area is noted for its scams, drug peddling, sexual assaults. Instead, the more modern South Delhi is now becoming the main center for backpackers.

== History ==
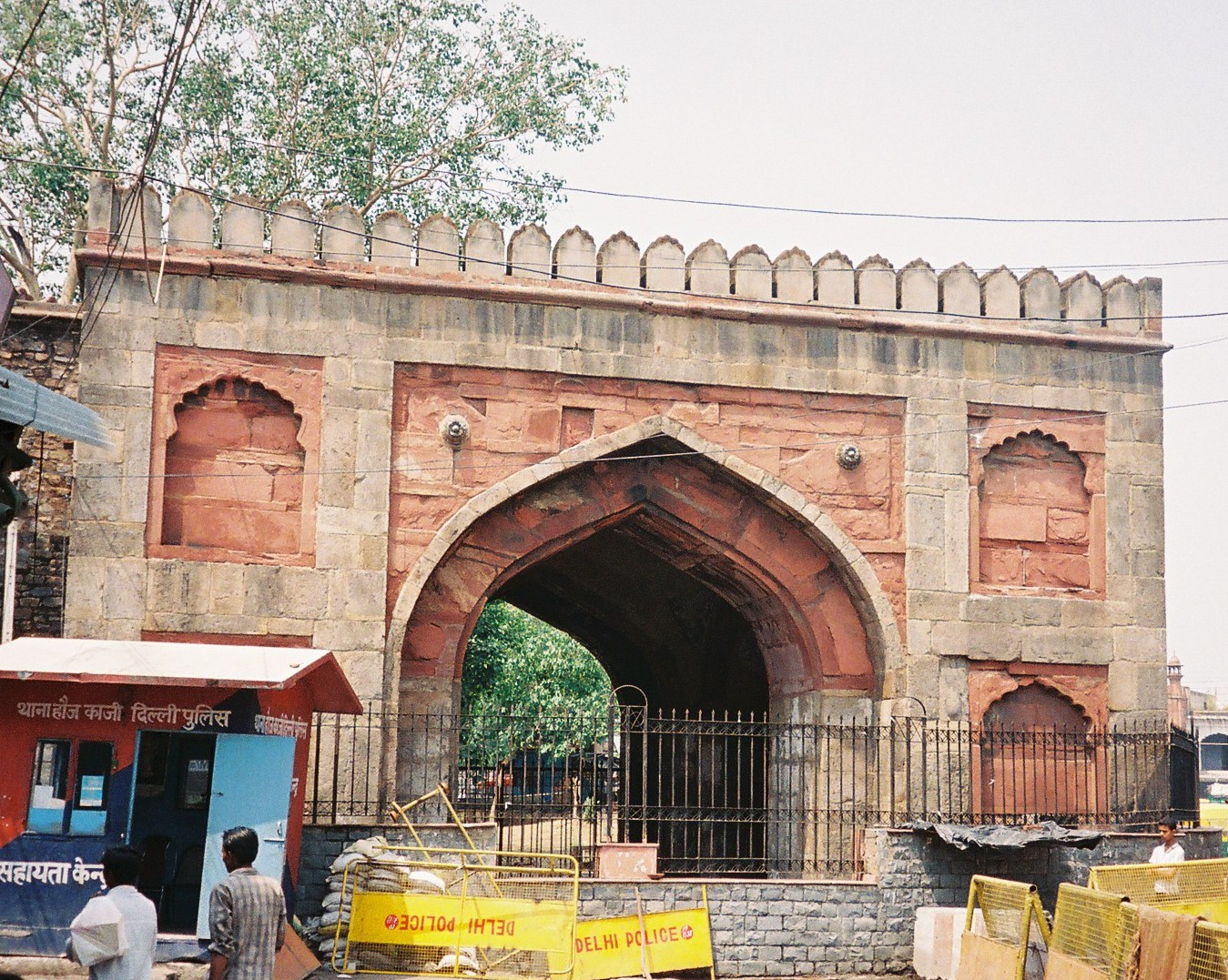
Ajmeri Gate, once Paharganj's access to the walled city

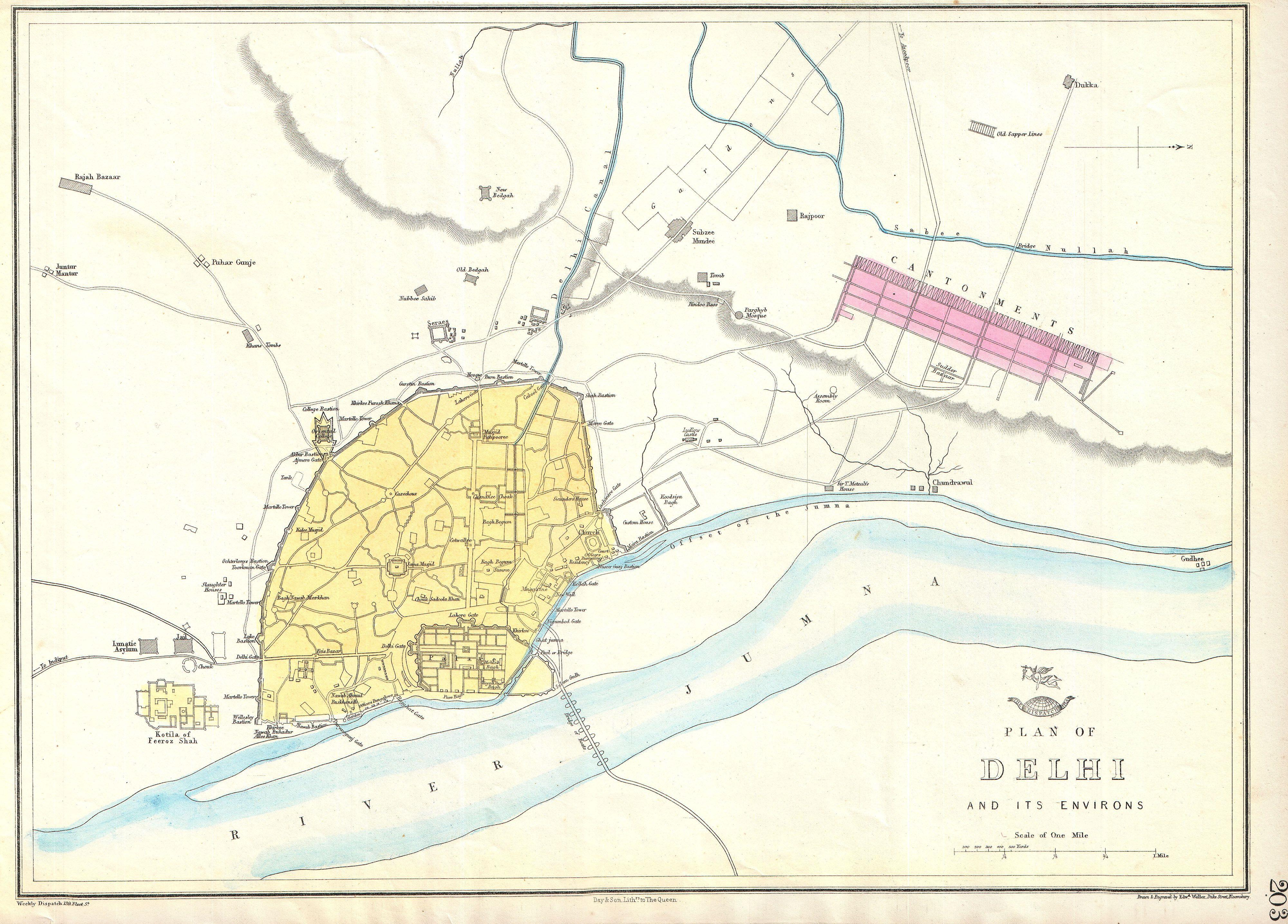
Historic map of Delhi (Shahjahanabad), 1863, showing Paharganj outside the city walls (top left corner)

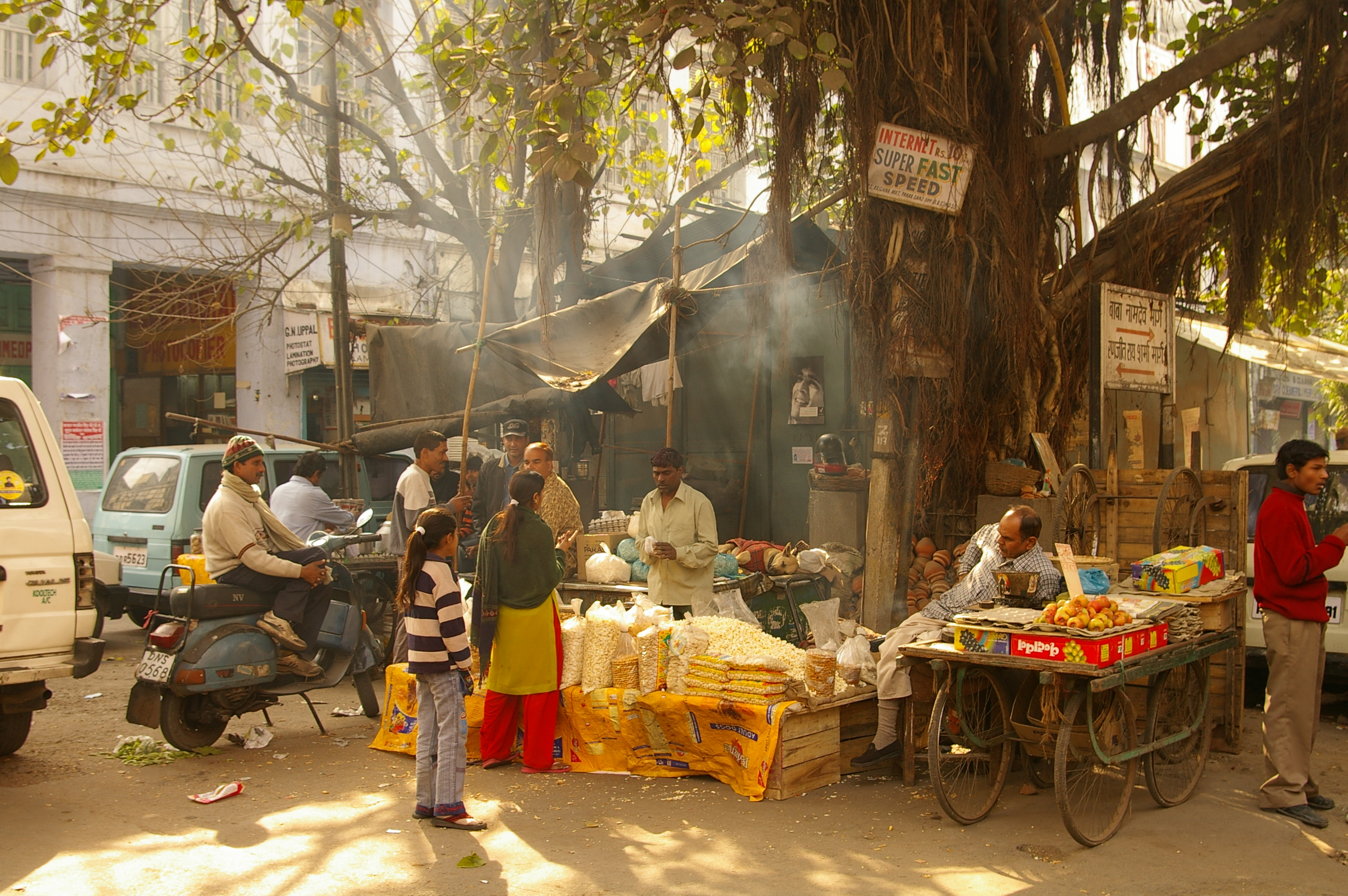
Main Bazaar of Paharganj, Delhi

=== Mughal era ===
In the years after its establishment in 1638, Shahjahanabad, the capital of the Mughal Empire under Shah Jahan, was no longer contained within the walled city, it soon spilled into surrounding areas, stretching into miles at each end, where half of its population stayed. By 1739, the suburbs covered 1800 acres and included areas like Mughalpura, Sabzimandi, Paharganj, and Jaisingh Pura. One of the largest and most important suburban mohalla of the Walled City of Delhi, and located just outside the Ajmeri Gate of the Walled city, Paharganj was one of five main markets of Delhi, and the only one outside the walled city. Also, it was the principal grain market of the city in the 18th century, where grain was ferried, across Yamuna River, from wholesale markets and warehouses in Patparganj and Shahdara. Just outside the Ajmeri Gate was the custom house of the emperor, for collecting taxes. Between Paharganj and Akbarabadi gate of the walled city was Shahganj, another wholesale market, while on the other side towards Jantar Mantar was Raja Bazar. In fact, Paharganj was also referred as Shahganj or King's ganj or market place during Mughal era, it gets its present name 'Paharganj', literally meaning Hilly neighbourhood, owing to its proximity to the Raisina Hill, where the Rashtrapati Bhavan stand today. Till 1857, neighbourhoods like Paharganj, Kishenganj, and Pahari Dhiraj, were separate pockets which in the following years grew and merged, for example Pahari Dhiraj merged into Sadar Bazaar.

In the 1690s, Ghaziuddin Khan, a general of Mughal Emperor Aurangzeb, a leading Deccan commander and the father of Asaf Jah I, the founder of the Asaf Jahi dynasty of Hyderabad, through religious endowment founded a madrasa, Madrasa Ghaziuddin Khan after him. It eventually paved way for the present Zakir Hussain College, which in 1986, shifted to a new building outside Turkman Gate, the old structure in the Madrasa Ghaziuddin complex, still houses a hostel for the college and Ghaziuddin's mausoleum. Also Anglo Arabic Senior Secondary School operates at the same place.

=== British era ===
Cheh Tuti Chowk or Six Tuti Chowk, Main Bazar, Paharganj, with historic Qazi Wali Masjid in the background.

When the Lutyens' Delhi was being built in the 1920s, the area also saw major development, and the old 'Imperial theatre', built in 1930, stands as a legacy to that era. Its neighboring area of Jaisinghpura, where Gurudwara Bangla Sahib stands today, along with Madhoganj and Raja ka Bazaar were demolished to make way for the Connaught Place, shopping district. Indeed, the "Delhi Town Planning Committee on the planning of new Imperial capital" with George Swinton as chairman and John A. Brodie and Lutyens as members, submitted its report on 13 June 1912; it proposed a plan to include Paharganj and Sadar Bazaar into the developing new imperial city, as they were areas on the boundary between Old Delhi and New Delhi. However, it was rejected by the Viceroy, when the cost of compensation while acquiring the properties, was found to be too high. The central axis of New Delhi, which today faces east at India Gate, was previously meant to be a north–south axis, linking Viceroy's House with Paharganj, as the end of the axis.

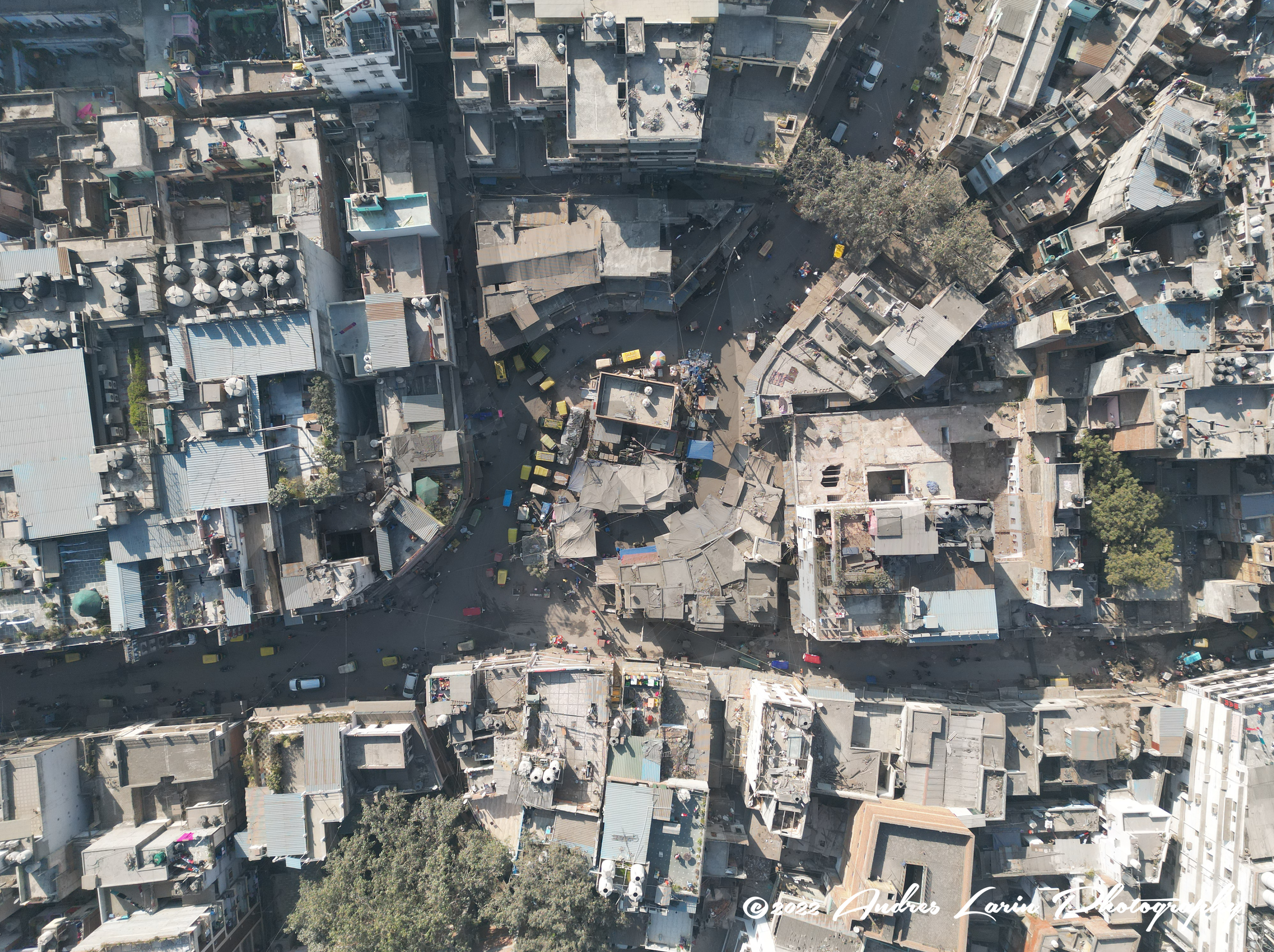
Drone shot of a Cheh Tuti Chowk in 2023

Gradually, Chai-Tuti-Chowk or Six Tuti Chowk, named after six water taps originally place here for the public, developed as an important market location, and a shopping area of Paharganj, within shops of cloth merchants coming up around it. Prior to the inauguration of New Delhi in 1931, the New Delhi Railway Station was opened with a single platform near Ajmeri Gate in 1926, until then the Old Delhi Railway Station served the entire city. This changed Paharganj landscape indelibly, with an influx of travelers, small eateries started coming up in the area, and also temporary residential facilities.

The famous Shri Nand Lal Sharma dhaba was set up here in 1928, over time, his son built a three-storey hotel on spot, and now his grandson manages the Metropolis, known for its rooftop restaurant, which still has many Russian dishes on its menu. "Shiela Cinema" at Paharganj was Delhi's first 70mm screen, second being "Odeon" in Connaught Place. "Imperial" and "Khanna" were other talkies in the area. Gradually, the entire area was catering to the tourism industry, though the grain bazaars of Mughal era were long gone, in early 20th century, Paharganj still had principal markets in Delhi for building materials, cement, timber and steel, but by 1947 they had mostly shifted to other locations in the city, while Paharganj had become primarily a densely populated residential and commercial area, replete with cheap hotels and restaurants for domestic and foreign tourists.

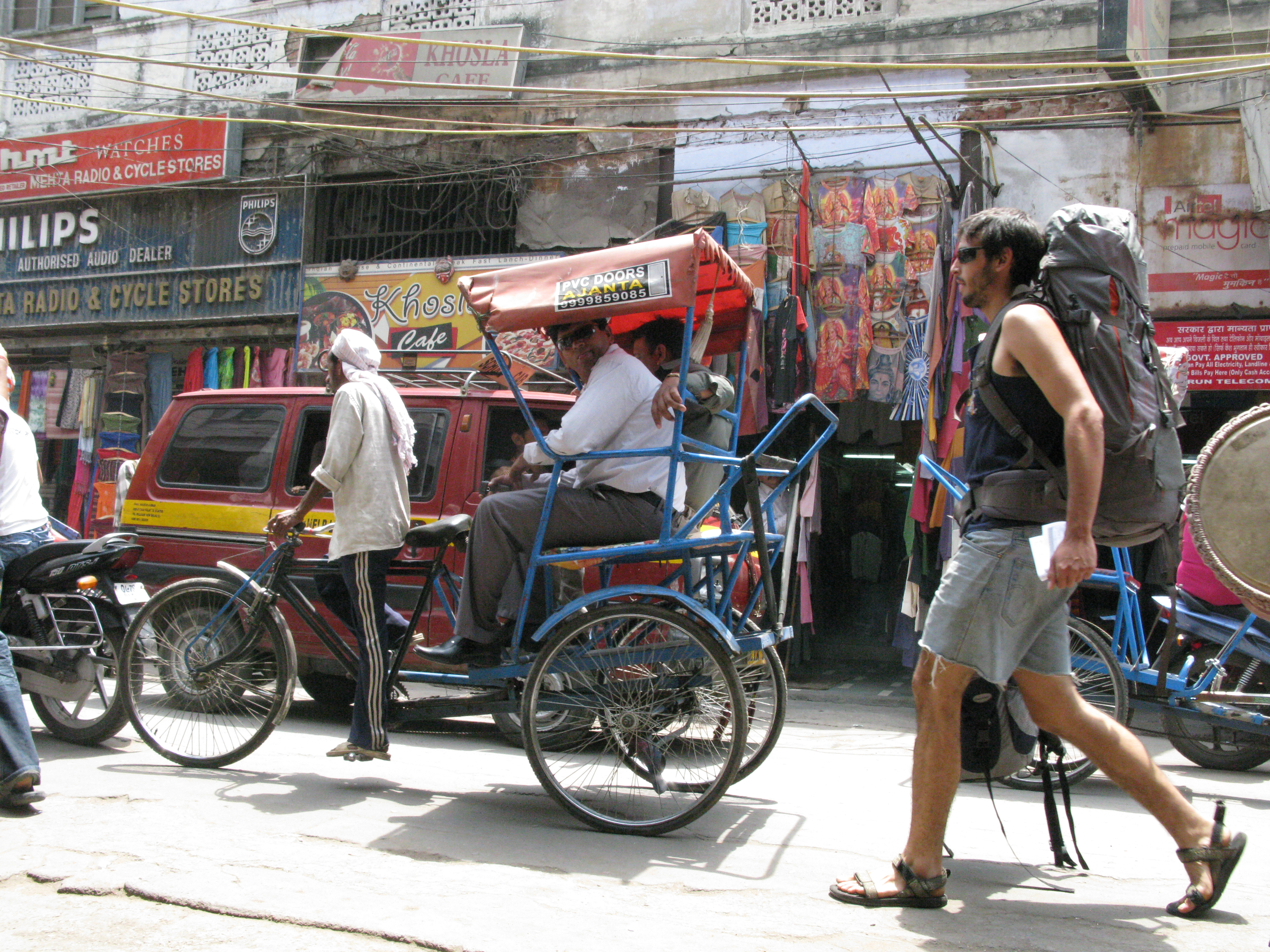
Popular with backpackers, since the 1970s.

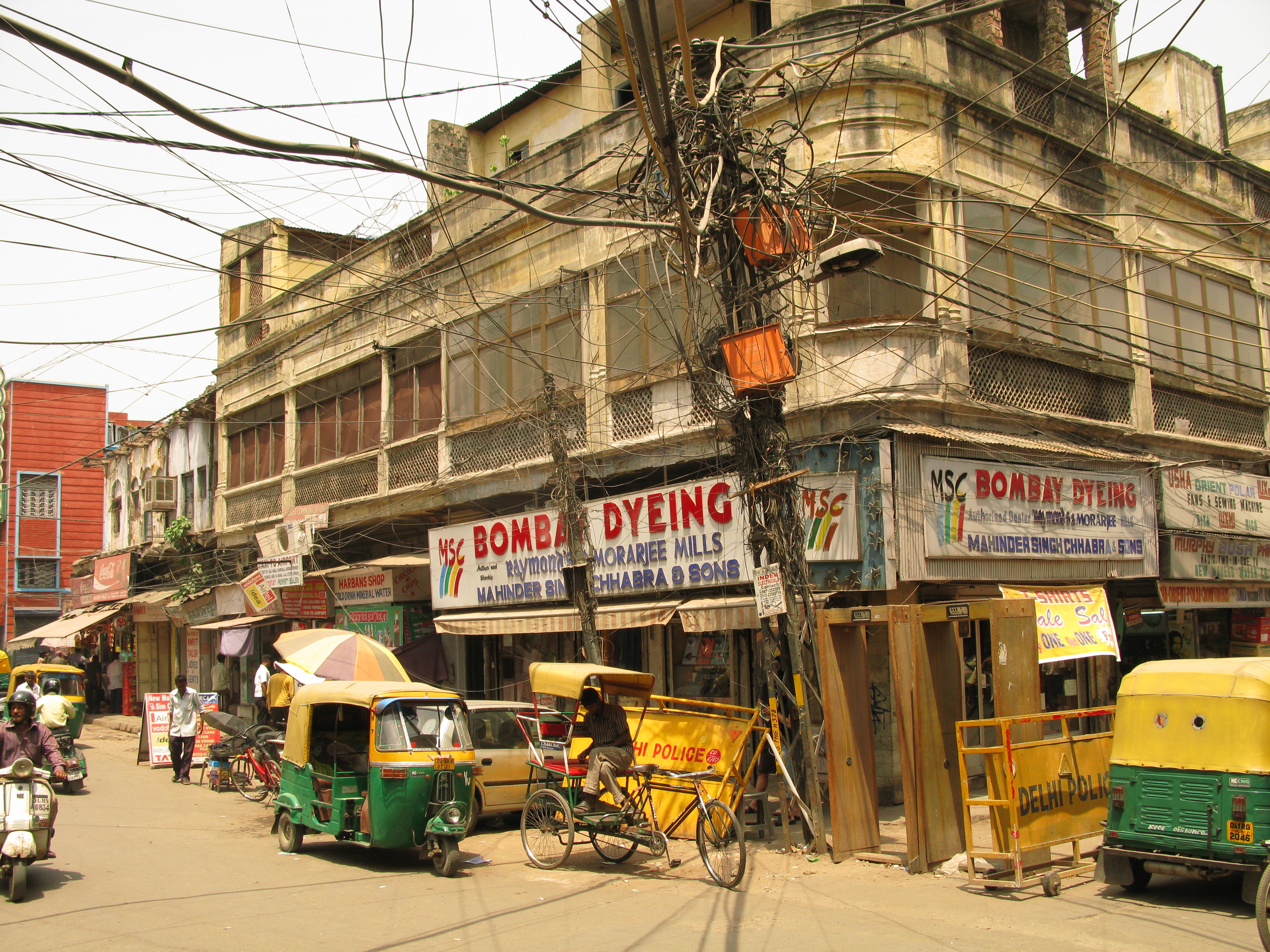
Street in Pahar Ganj, Delhi, 2009

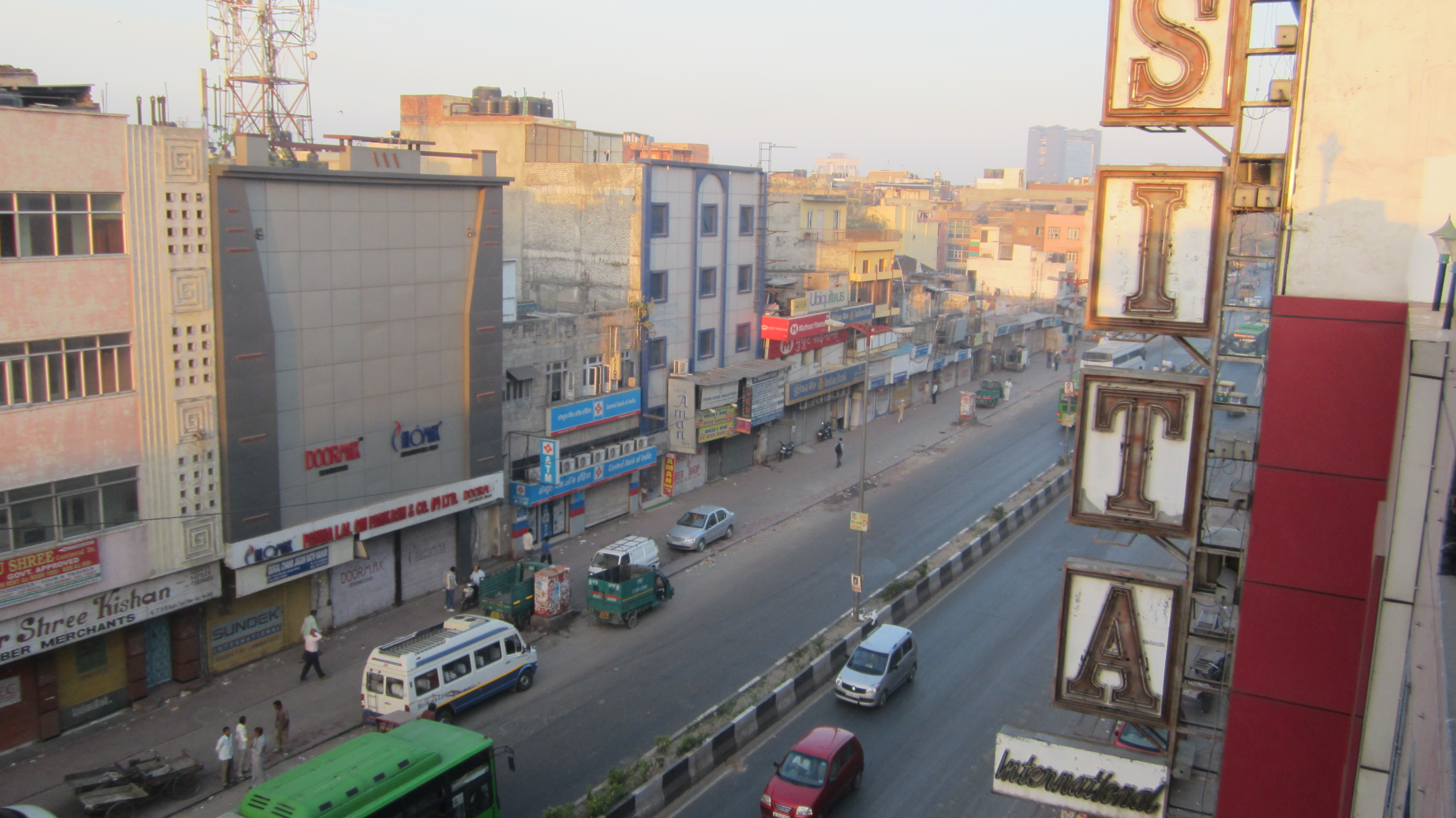
DB Gupta Road in Paharganj, a morning view

Paharganj witnessed upheavals during the prolonged Indian independence struggle, like during the Quit India Movement of August 1942, the British barracks near Paharganj were attacked and the soldiers' were thrown out, who then sought refuge in an Indian's bungalow, later the Paharganj Post office and five terminal tax posts were also raided by the mob and burnt down.

==== Hindu Jat and Muslim riots of 1924 ====
During the British Raj, Muslims had built a slaughterhouse closer to the Jhandewalan temple. In May 1924 on the day of Bakri Eid the Muslims of Pahari Dhiraj of Paharganj slaughtered the cow – which is revered by the Hindus as sacred Kamadhenu – in the slaughterhouse closer to the Jhandewala temple. This angered the Hindu Jats of Sadar Bazaar, which led to the riots among the Jats and Muslims from 11 to 18 July, resulting in loss of life and property. Muhammad Ali Jinnah repeatedly requested Mahatma Gandhi and Indian National Congress (INC) to stop the rioting Jats, but Gandhi and INC were unable to control the situation. Riots were eventually stopped by the police.

=== Post-independence ===
Subsequently, during the Partition of India in 1947 it again saw extensive rioting, thereafter the area saw a vast influx of Hindu refugees from Pakistan, when several shops and small establishments were allotted to them, since then the area has seen vast development and seen the burgeoning marketplace that it is today.

With the arrival of the Hippie movement in the 70s at India's shores, the area became a regular part of the Hippie trail, for hippies, backpackers, and college students looking for budget accommodations near Connaught Place, New Delhi and New Delhi Railway Station. Gradually the hotels and guest houses spread until neighboring Ram Nagar and an area along Deshbandhu Gupta Road. This legacy which continues even today, with its streams of budget hotels, cafes and restaurants, specializing in global cuisines, and hordes of cybercafes. Apart from that Paharganj also has a Chabad House as it is frequented by the large number of Jewish and Israeli tourists, and bakeries like 'German Bakery', named 'Ajay Cafe' 19 years ago.

The area is known for its concentration of affordable hotels, lodges, restaurants, dhabas and a wide variety of shops catering to both domestic travellers and foreign tourists, especially backpackers and low-budget travellers, it has become particularly popular as a haunt for international cuisine. Over the years, Paharganj has become the biggest hotel hub for low-budget foreign tourists in Delhi, though with rising congestion, the proliferation of illegal bars and illegal activities like drug peddling, Paharganj has also become a hotspot for crime, and a criminal hideout. The area has shelters and homes, run by Salaam Baalak Trust, an NGO, for street and working children, established in 1988. The trust has run the Salaam Baalak City Walk - New Delhi, a guided tour through Paharganj and New Delhi Railway Station area. The guides are former street children from the trust. The walk aims to sensitize about street life, street children and Indian society problems. During the walk, the guides share their personal story of survival with the participants and show them the contact points and shelter homes SBT provides.

In 2005, during 29 October 2005 Delhi serial bombings, the first blast took place in the main bazaar of Paharganj, during busy shopping period, two days before festival of Diwali.

Ahead of the 2010 Commonwealth Games, a massive Rs. 800 million ($17 million) facelift program for Paharganj was implemented by Municipal Corporation of Delhi (MCD) in 2009, it included 56 roads and lanes in Paharganj, where over 500 hotels and lodges were expecting to host visitors for the games. Some shops were demolished in areas like Main Bazar, Ram Nagar market and Amrit Kaur market, markets were given uniform design, all road was relaid, sidewalks and pavements were also added, to decongest the area by September 2010.

== Historic monuments ==
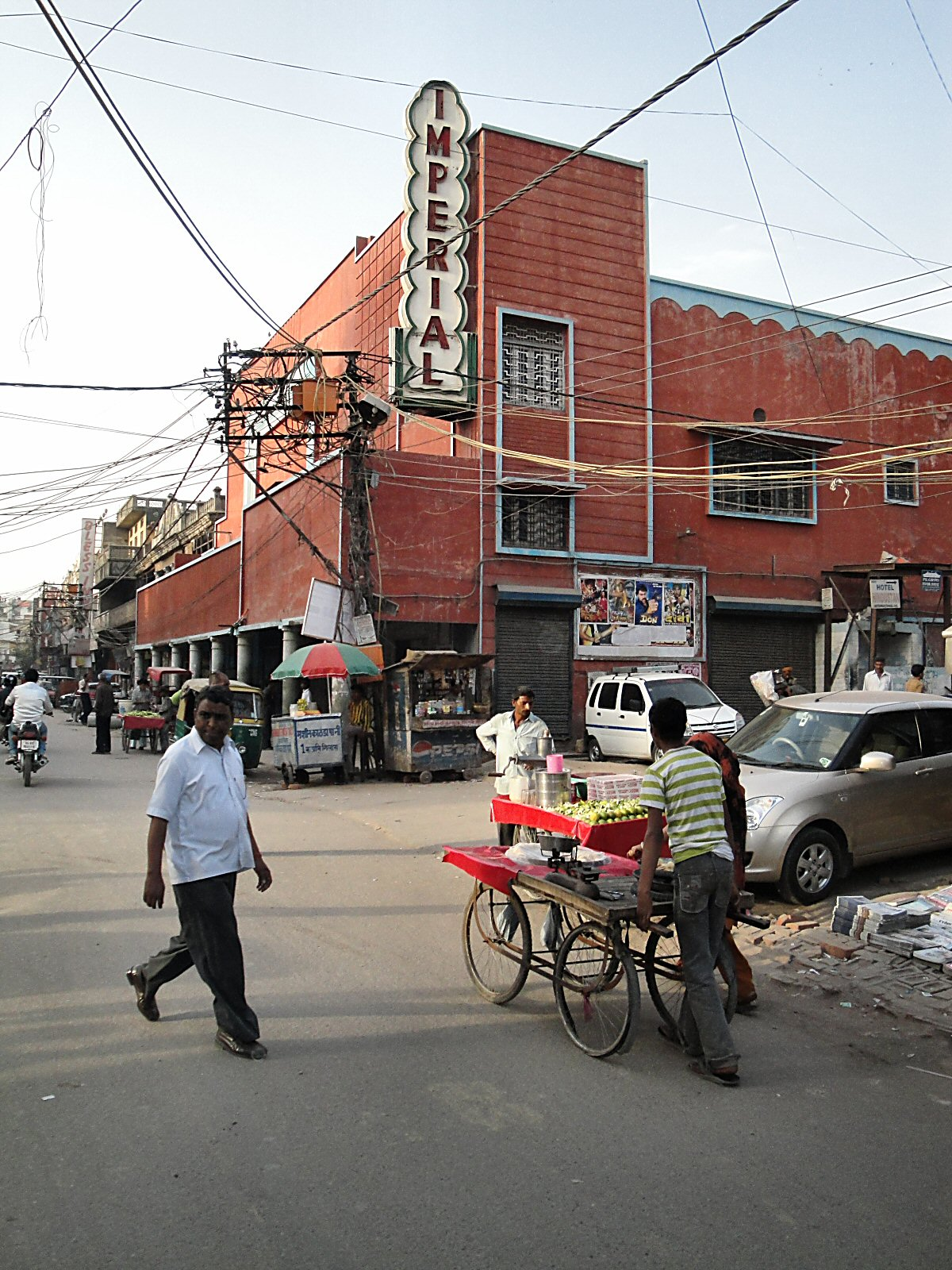
Imperial Cinema in Paharganj

Paharganj is also home to the historic Qadam Sharif dargah, dedicated to the footprint of Muhammaf, originally built by Firuz Shah Tughlaq, a 14th-century Sultan of Delhi. Qazi Wali Masjid, known for its intricate engravings, and arched doorways. The grave of poet laureate of Mughal court, Zauq, who lived nearby Nabi Karim and died in 1854, lies in the bylanes of Paharganj. It was restored in early 2000s, after the Supreme Court orders, but his house was never identified.

== Administration and politics ==
Today Sadar-Paharganj constitutes one of the 12 administrative zones of Municipal Corporation of Delhi (MCD).

Paharganj was a Delhi Metropolitan Council segment, within the Chandni Chowk, Lok Sabha constituency, 1966–93. Thereafter it remained the Delhi State Assembly constituency, under Chandni Chowk, Lok Sabha constituency, from 1993 to 2008, Subsequently, following the delimitation of the parliamentary constituencies, in 2008, it became of the New Delhi Lok Sabha constituency.

== Tourism ==
Paharganj has known for its affordable hotels, lodges, and a wide variety of shops especially among backpackers starting from the 1970s. Now newer part of the city, particularly South Delhi is gaining gradual popularity among backpackers.

== In popular culture ==
The tourist culture of Paharganj has been a theme for many films, including Kate Winslet starrer, Holy Smoke! (1999), parts of which were shot when she stayed at a Paharganj hotel, in September 1998. In 2008, parts of the Hindi film, Dev.D (2009) directed by Anurag Kashyap were shot in Paharganj area, depicting the seedy side of hotel industry, from prostitution to drug peddling.
