= Delhi College =

Delhi College can refer to these colleges in Delhi, India:

- Zakir Husain Delhi College, University of Delhi; formerly known as Delhi College, founded in 1792 as Madrasa Ghaziuddin Khan
- Delhi College of Arts and Commerce, University of Delhi
- College of Art, Delhi, University of Delhi
- Delhi College of Engineering, now Delhi Technological University

== See also ==
- State University of New York at Delhi, Delhi, New York, US
