= Battle of Sironj =

1704 battle during the Deccan wars

- Part of Mughal–Maratha Wars
Date	January 1704
Location	Sironj, Malwa
Result	Mughal victory

Belligerents
Maratha Empire	Mughal Empire

Commanders and leaders
Nima Sindhia	Firouz Jung

The Battle of Sironj was a military engagement between the Mughal army led by Firuz Jung and the Maratha troops led by Nima Sindhia. The Mughals were victorious and the Marathas were repulsed from Sironj.

== Background ==
In October 1703, after the rains were over, Nima Sindhia launched a raid with 50,000 horsemen into Mughal territories. He marched to Berar where he met Rustam Khan, the governor of Berar, and defeated him. He raided Hoshangabad district and marched into Malwa, sacking and ravaging everything in his way until he reached Sironj, where he laid siege to it. The Mughal garrison resisted the Marathas.

== Battle ==
When news of this reached Aurangzeb, he ordered Firuz Jung to catch and defeat the raiders. He left Berar in November 1703, However, the march was slow due to heavy baggage. He abandoned the baggage and camped at Burhanpur, then he swiftly marched to relieve Sironj. When he arrived, he engaged the Marathas, defeating their vanguard and forcing his way to the elephant ridden by Nima. When Nima saw the reinforcements, he fled on horseback with his remaining followers to Bundelkhand. Many Marathas were slain; the Mughals recaptured the looted treasure from the Marathas and prisoners were released.

== Aftermath ==
Bhimsen, the literary champion of Zulfiqar Khan, who had served as a rival to Firuz Jang, wrote that no fighting had taken place and the reports of the victory were wrong. He wrote that once the emperor discovered the real truth, the honors were postponed. Similarly, Manucci recorded that the Marathas left without fighting, returning to their territory. The Akhbarats state otherwise, and the Kalimat T corroborates the version of the Akhbarats.

== Sources ==
- R.K. Gupta (2008), Studies In Indian History: Rajasthan Through The Ages The Heritage Of Rajputs (Set Of 5 Vols.).
- Jadunath Sarkar (1984), A History of Jaipur, C. 1503-1938.
