= Syed Muhammad Saleem =

Professor Syed Muhammad Saleem
- Born: 1922; Tijara, Rajputana, (now Rajasthan)
- Died: 27 October 2000
- Education: Anglo Arabic Senior Secondary School, Aligarh Muslim University
- Known for: Islamic studies
- Spouse: Asia Khatoon

Syed Muhammad Saleem (1922–2000) was an Islamic scholar and activist of the All-India Muslim League at the time of independence of Pakistan in 1947.

== Biography ==
Syed Muhammad Saleem was a prominent Islamic scholar, activist of the All-India Muslim League at the time of the independence of Pakistan in 1947, Professor at Government Colleges at Hyderabad, Shikarpur, Mirpur, Nawabshah and Principal, Shah Waliullah Oriental College (Mansura, Sindh). He was also the Director of Idara-e-Taaleemi Tahqeeq, Lahore.

=== Education ===
After initial education (Taleem-ul-Quran) in 1931 from Abdussamad Nabina and Syed Imtiaz Ali, he took preliminary examination of Munshi (Persian) and Maulvi (Arabic) in 1938 and 1939 respectively from the Panjab University. In 1940, he did Matriculation from the State High School of Tijara. He did Intermediate in 1942 and BA in 1944 from the Anglo Arabic Senior Secondary School. In 1946, he completed his education from Aligarh Muslim University and earned MA, LLB.

=== Family history ===
A branch of 'Sadat Jafaria' came to Multan India from Nishapur along with Shahabuddin Muhammad Ghori. From the same family, Syed Abdur Rasul was appointed as Qazi at Gurgaon. Qazi Syed Karam Ali Shah was advocate at the Sultanate of Shah Alam. He had three sons Syed Ashraf Ali, Syed Walayat Ali and Syed Baqar Ali

Syed Ashraf Ali was the great-grandfather of Syed Muhammad Saleem and was a scholar, physician, poet and calligrapher of his time. Syed Ashraf Ali read Tibb and also wrote few books in Persian. He was settled and married in Tijara. Because of learned mind, he was offered Tahsildar by Maharaja Alwar

=== Political and social works ===
Since the days of college life, he started taking interest for a separate nation of Muslims of India. After the Lahore Resolution on 23 March 1940, Qaid-e-Azam asked Muslim students to participate for the struggle of Pakistan. Muhammad Saleem joined Muslim Students Federation (MSF) at Delhi and worked with leaders of MSF like Imdad Husain and Bilgrami in 1942.

Muhammad Saleem attended a meeting of Muslim League Council in 1941 in which it was resolved and vehemently opposed the attack on Yemen by Britishers. He was a BA student in 1943 when another annual meeting of Muslim League Council was held at Anglo Arabic Senior Secondary School.

He was the president of Majlis-e Islamiat at Aligarh Muslim University and hence represented students delegation at many meetings of All-India Muslim League.

At the time of national election in March 1946, All-India Muslim League also participated as political party and asked MSF volunteers to work for the party candidates. Muhammad Saleem led a university students delegation to Rohtak and took part in canvassing of a candidate Rao Khursheed Ali Khan, who later on won the election. It is estimated that around 14 thousand students of Aligarh Muslim University took part in that election at different cities of India.

On 7 April 1946, Muhammad Saleem from Aligarh also attended a meeting of Muslim League Council, which was held at Anglo Arabic Senior Secondary School. In the same meeting, leaders of Muslim League returned the government medals and asked for the final creation of Pakistan.

Muhammad Saleem was an active member of Jamaat-e-Islami since 1940. He worked for the Jamaat at Aligarh from the platform "Majlis-e Islamiat". He arranged a book stall of Jamaat at 'Aligarh Exhibition' during 1944–45. He familiarised many students about the aims and objectives of the Jamaat. Under his influence, a student from Sri Lanka, Abdul Qadir Jeelani, also started working for Jamaat-e-Islami at Sri Lanka and published a periodical "bood neem" in Tamil.

After the creation of Pakistan, Muhammad Saleem continued his association with Jamaat-e-Islami. In 1969, he was active in the formation of Pakistan Teachers' Association, of which he remained first as vice president of Sindh branch, and then as president Sindh branch and national president. He was also the director of Idara-e-Taaleemi Tahqeeq, Lahore.

== Marriage and children ==
He was married to Asia Khatoon, granddaughter of Qazi Khaliluddin.

== Bibliography ==
=== Books ===
He was the author of many articles and books. Following is a list of some published books:

- Turk wa Tatari Aqwame Roos Ke Chingal Main
- Talimi Inhetat ke Asbab
- Jamaat-e Islami Taleem ke Maidan Main
- Deeni Madaris ke Rawayat aur Nisab ki Khusosiyat
- Tarikh Nazriya Pakistan
- Tarikh Quran Majeed
- Quran Ka Tasawar-i-Taleem (1980)
- Magharbi Falsfa e Taleem ka Tanqeedi Mutalia (PDF)
- Tareekh-e-Khat or Khatateen
- Musalman Misali Asatiza aur Misali Talib-e-Ilm

== Death ==
He died during the annual meeting of Jamaat-e-Islami at Qurtaba, Islamabad on 27 October 2000. His funeral was attended by thousands of members of Jamaat-e-Islami and was buried next day at Karachi.
