= Prabhat Ranjan =

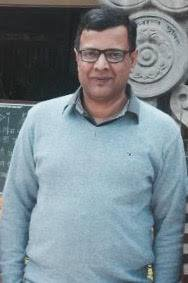
- Born: 3 November 1970 (age 55); Sitamarhi district, Bihar, India
- Citizenship: Indian
- Education: Ph.D
- Alma mater: Hindu College, University of Delhi
- Writing career
- Genres: Novels, Short Stories, Translation, Critic, Blogger
- Website: jankipul.com

Prabhat Ranjan (born 3 November 1970) is a Hindi novelist, fiction writer, and translator. He is currently professor of Hindi at Zakir Husain Delhi College (Evening) in the University of Delhi, Delhi. He runs an online literary website Jankipul.com since 10 years.

He has worked as editor of Bahuvachan and Hindi Magazine and Assistant Editor of reputed Hindi daily Jansatta. He has also received several awards. He has translated almost 20 reputed literary books of world literature.

== Personal life ==
=== Background ===
Ranjan was born on 11 November 1970 in the small village of Sitamari District of Bihar. He has done his B.A. M.A. & Ph.D. in the subject of Hindi from Hindu College, University of Delhi. His interest in Hindi language and literature forced him to continue education in the field of Hindi literature and he completed his Ph.D. from University of Delhi.

He is married to Dr. Rohini Kumari, who is a noted translator and Korean Language Expert. She did her PhD in Korean Language and Literature from Jawaharlal Nehru University, New Delhi.

== Career ==
Prabhat Ranjan started his career as the Editor of Bahuvachan and Hindi in Mahatma Gandhi Antarrashtriya Hindi University, Wardha. He later joined as Assistant Editor of Jansatta, a Hindi daily. Currently he is professor of Hindi language and literature in Zakir Husain Delhi College.

== Academic contribution ==
Short Stories collections

- Jankipul (2009), Bolero Class (2011)

Novel

- Kothagoi (2015)

Non Fiction

- Paltoo Bohemian

Translation

- Anne Frank's Diary
- Mohsin Hamd's novel Moth Smoke
- Khushwant Singh's book ‘Khushwantnama
- I do What I do by Raghuram Rajan (Former Reserve Bank Governor, Economist)
- Hit Refresh by Satya Nadella (First Indian Head of Microsoft)

== Awards ==
- Sahara Samay Katha Samman
- ABP news best blogger award (2014)
- Krishna Baldev Vaid Fellowship (2013)
- Dwarika Prasad Agrawal Bhaskar Yuva Puraskar (2016)
