= Salaam Baalak Trust =

Indian non-profit child welfare organization

Salaam Baalak Trust Delhi
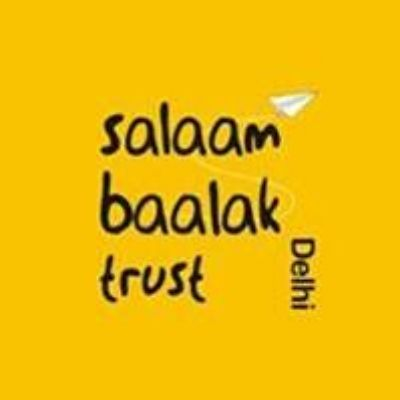
- Abbreviation: SBT
- Formation: 1988
- Type: Non Governmental Organisation
- Purpose: Support for street children and working children
- Location: New Delhi
- Chairperson: Praveen Nair
- Budget: Rs. 15 crore (2024-2025)
- Staff: Over 250
- Volunteers: 120 per year (including Indians and foreigners)
- Website: Salaam Baalak Trust, Delhi

Salaam Baalak Trust (SBT) is an Indian non-profit and non-governmental organization which provides support for street and working children in the Delhi-NCR. It was established in 1988 with the proceeds from the film Salaam Bombay! directed by Mira Nair. Programs at SBT include repatriation, providing education (formal education, informal education and open learning), basic literacy and schooling, full care facilities for the young (up to 18 years), drop-in shelters for older children, physical and mental health care, life-skills education, vocational training, sports, job placement and counselling in HIV/AIDS.

SBT runs seven 24-hour full care residential homes for children and teenagers all over India, of which two are devoted to girls (Arushi and Udaan - Rose Home). 10 contact points-day care centers, mostly near railway stations and three 24-hour toll-free helpline service (1098), cater to children in distress and problems all over India. Therefore, looking after nearly 10,000 children every year. Salaam Baalak Trust children, who have been trained in theatre, dance and puppetry, are giving performances all over the world.

Since 2007, SBT Delhi has been running the City Walk Program, a guided tour through Paharganj and New Delhi Railway Station area. The guides are former street children who went through the same process from the Trust. The walk aims to sensitise the guests about street life, street children and children in distress. During the Walk, the guides share their personal story of survival and walk them through the contact points/day care and residential homes. The walk, thus, also provides an opportunity for the young adults to improve their communication and marketing skills. All proceeds go directly towards the Trust to enable more opportunities. From April 2019 to March 2020, the City Walk Program did 902 walks and 8353 visitors were sensitised from across the world.

In addition to the City Walk tour, SBT also offers a Heritage Walk through Old Delhi, showcasing six hidden places, including markets, havelis, and five different religions that have existed in the area since 1638. This walk acquaints tourists with all that has survived in Old Delhi since Shah Jahan, the fifth Mughal Emperor who made Delhi the capital of his empire. The walk takes tourists on an adventure ride through the city and lands panoramic views of Old Delhi from a spice market rooftop. It ends at one of SBT's contact points to offer a glimpse into what street children have survived.

== History ==
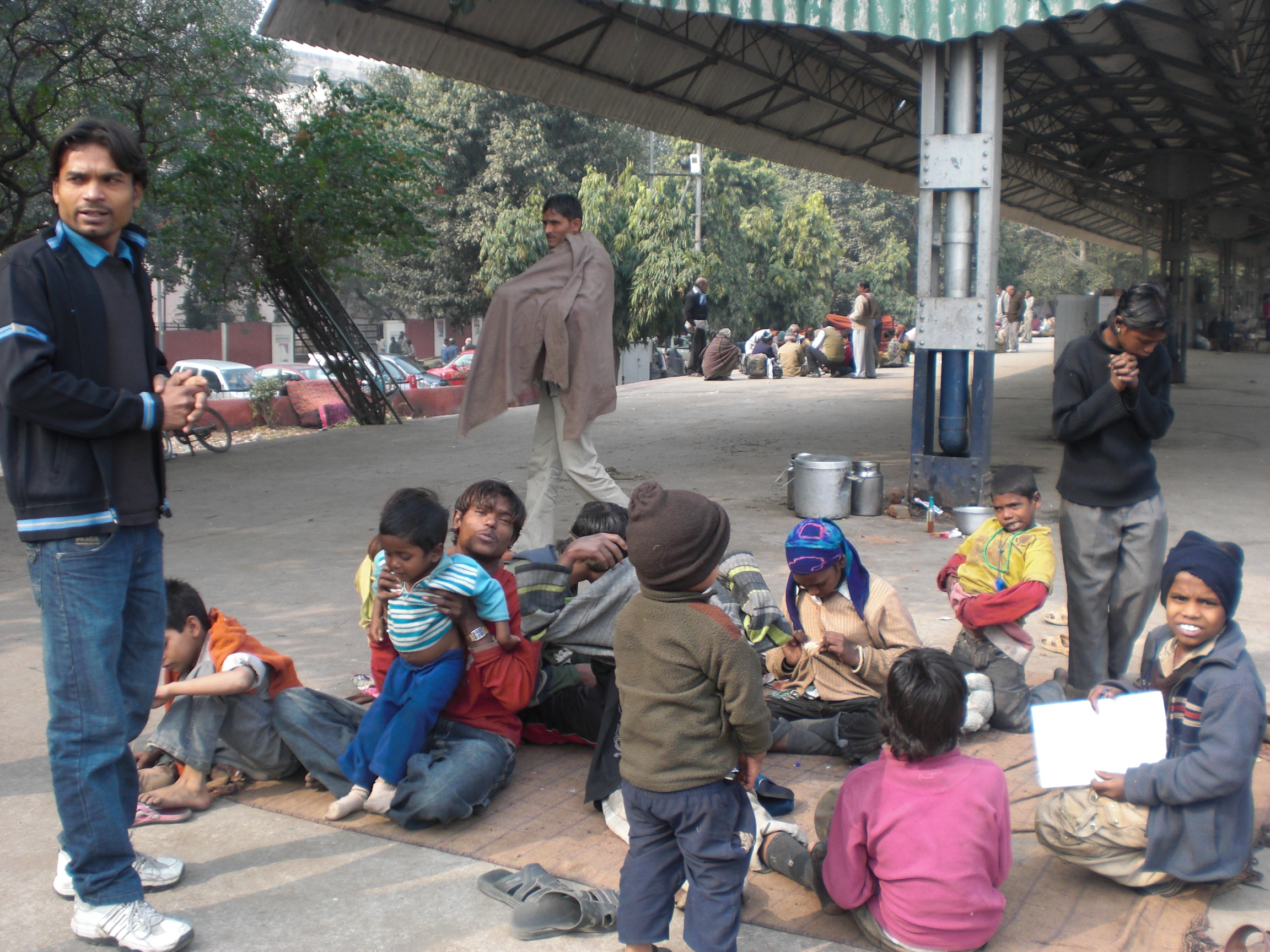
SBT contact point for street children on a platform from New Delhi Railway Station

Originally established in 1988 to rehabilitate the children who appeared in the film, Salaam Bombay! (1988) in Mumbai, Salaam Baalak Trust started working in 1989, and by 2005 it had 17 centres for street child throughout India.

This struck a chord with the trustees, who identified the potential in India's street children. A trust was created where young street boys and girls could feel secure and could breathe hope. In New Delhi, SBT started its operations with a staff of 3 and 25 children in the open-air balcony of the Police Station at the New Delhi Railway Station. It has now grown to employ a staff of 142, providing support services in Delhi & NCR region. SBT currently functions through 13 Contact Points/Day Care Centers and 5 Shelter Homes, which provide a holistic child development. In its 25 years of operation, it has brought about a positive change in the lives of more than 50,000 children from India and abroad. SBT also manages an emergency Child Helpline (1098), which is a toll-free number to reach out to children in distress at any point of time.

Starting 1999, Family Health International (FHI), with funding from USAID, started working with the SBT, on HIV/AIDS education and prevention, while supplying, street children aged between 4 and 13 with food, medical aid, education, and essential supplies. Over the years its shelters have been visited by various national and international dignitaries, including, Tony Blair and Cherie Blair (2005).

Since 2003, it has also been working with volunteers from University College Dublin Volunteers Overseas, (UCDVO). In 2006, Salaam Baalak Trust won the ‘Civil Society Award’ from the National AIDS Control Organisation (NACO) and UNAIDS. Earlier in March, it started a guided city walk, through the areas managed by the Trust: its shelters, contact points, and areas around the New Delhi Railway Station in Paharganj, where the street children live and earn a living, doing menial jobs. The tour, guided by former street children themselves, sensitizes people about the lives of street children in Delhi, and the turnaround possible in the lives of these children, when given an opportunity.

Its latest home, DMRC Children Home, built exclusively for boys, was opened in New Delhi (near Tis Hazari Metro Station) in August 2010 and provides shelter to over 100 boys. The Arushi centre at Gurgaon was opened in 2008 and provided support to around 86 girls, aged between 5 and 18.

Recently, SBT has tied up with the Central Queensland University, Australia to provide higher education to its children.

The legendary actor Manoj Bajpayee spoke about his experience working for this NGO in his earlier days and giving workshop in juvenile home in Dongiri in his latest "The Bombay Journey" interview.
