= Salaam Baalak City Walk – New Delhi =

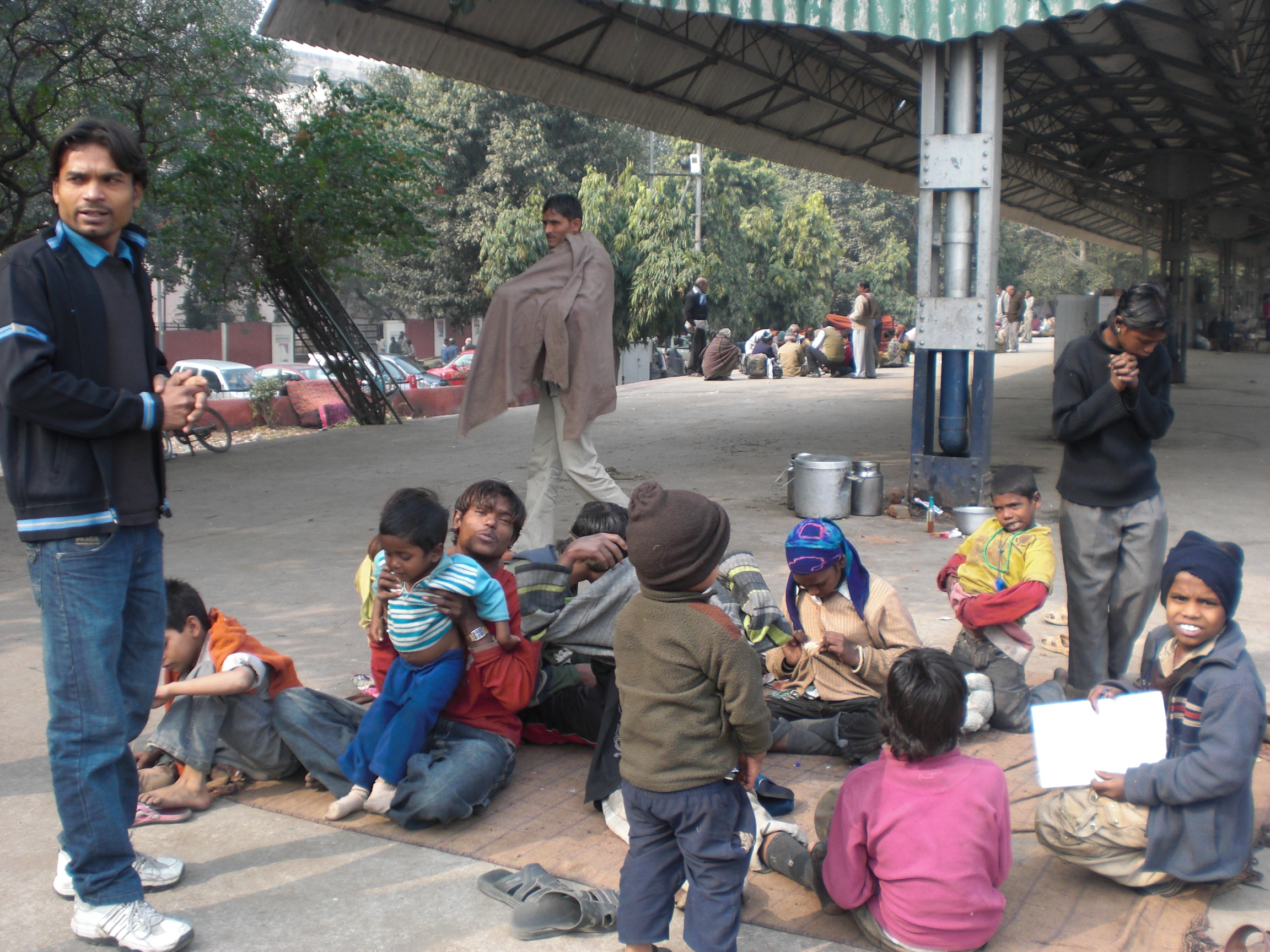
SBT contact point for street children on a platform from New Delhi Railway Station

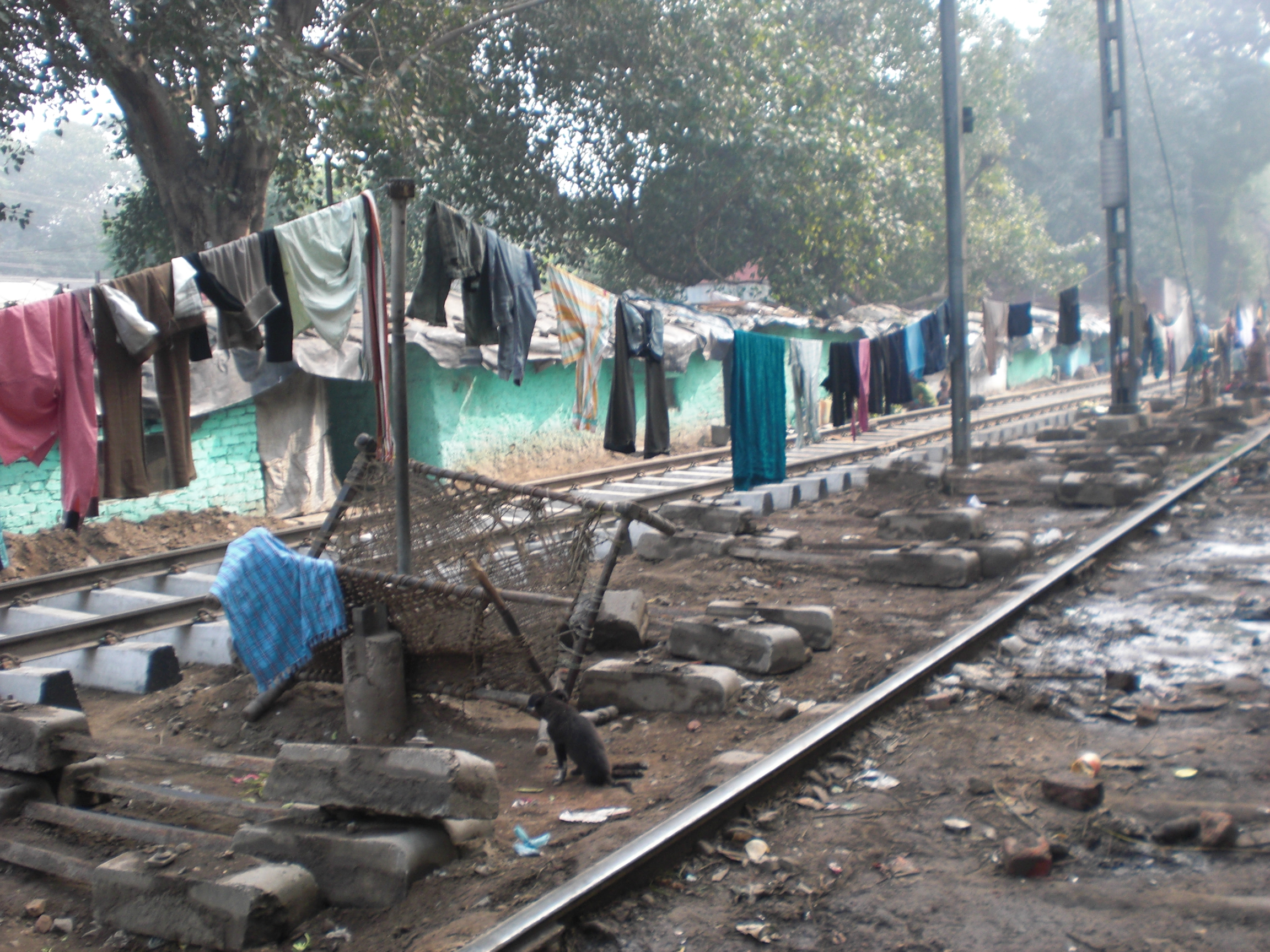
Railway community next to New Delhi Railway Station

The City Walk is a guided tour around New Delhi Railway Station and Paharganj area in which former street children share their personal story of survival with the participants and show them the contact points and shelter homes Salaam Baalak Trust provides.

Salaam Baalak Trust (SBT), a non-profit organisation, has been running the walk for about four years now, taking care of present and former street children in Delhi. Through this programme, the young guides, who are former children of the Trust, get an opportunity to improve their communication and marketing skills independently. The Walk aims to sensitise people to the lives of street children and helps to provide a deeper insight about street life from people who have experienced it themselves.

During 2012–13, the City Walk programme also received some significant media coverage by the BBC World, The Hindu, Hindustan Times and prominent German and Italian newspapers. With help from volunteers, BBT has developed new City Walk Trailers, which give a good first impression about the Walk.

All proceeds go directly to the trust to enable more opportunities to be made for street children. The walk does not make a profit.
