= Ghazi ud-Din Khan Feroze Jung I =

Mughal general and noble (c. 1649–1710)

Ghaziuddin Khan Bahadur, Firuz Jang, Farzand-i Arjomand Mir Shihab-ud-Din Siddiqi
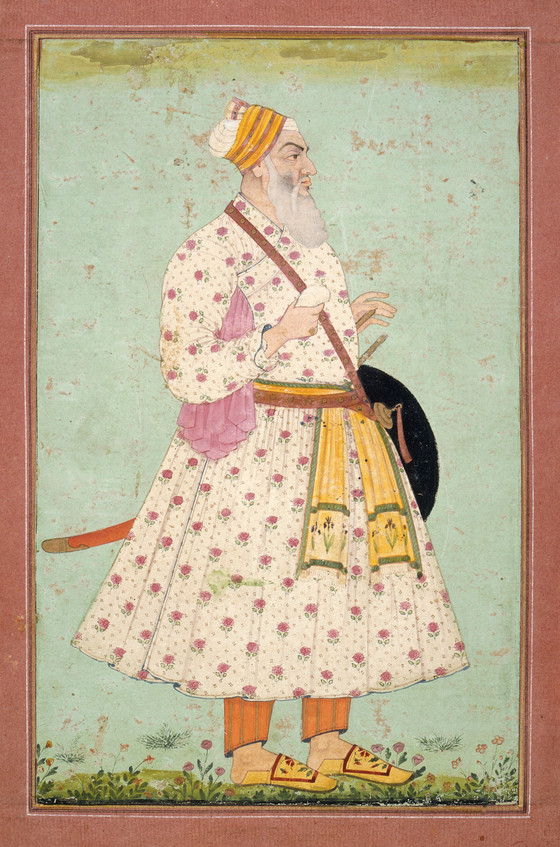
- Portrait of Ghaziuddin Bahadur Khan Firuz Jang I, c. 1675, from LACMA

Subahdar of Berar
- In office 1698–?
- Monarch: Aurangzeb

Subahdar of Gujarat
- In office 1708 – 8 December 1710
- Monarch: Bahadur Shah
- Preceded by: Ibrahim Khan

Subahdar of Ajmer
- In office 12 April 1708-? 15 June 1708-?
- Monarch: Bahadur Shah

Personal details
- Born: 1649 Bukhara
- Died: 8 December 1710 Ahmedabad, Gujarat Subah
- Resting place: Madrasa Ghaziuddin Khan, Old Delhi
- Spouse: Safiya Khanum
- Children: Chin Qilich Khan; Hamid Khan Bahadur; Rahimuddin Khan
- Parent: Abid Khan
- Awards: Mahi Maratib

Military service
- Battles/wars: Siege of Bijapur (1685-1686); Siege of Golconda (1687); Battle of Sironj (1704)

Mir Shihab-ud-Din Siddiqi (c. 1649-8 December 1710), known by his title Ghaziuddin Khan, was a leading military general and noble of Central Asian origin in the Mughal Empire.

He was a favoured member of emperor Aurangzeb's court, and the father of Chin Qilich Khan, the founder of Hyderabad State. Under Aurangzeb, he distinguished himself in key battles over the Deccan, and held the governorship of Berar Subah. He briefly served as the governor of Gujarat Subah during the reign of Aurangzeb's successor Bahadur Shah, and died in office. He is buried in a madrasa complex he founded, known as Madrasa Ghaziuddin Khan, which is located in Old Delhi.

== Early life ==
Ghaziuddin Khan was born in Bukhara (in present-day Uzbekistan) as Mir Shihab ud-Din Siddiqi, in the year 1649. He was the eldest son of Abid Khan, who had emigrated to Mughal India earlier than him and later became a favoured noble of emperor Aurangzeb. Ghaziuddin Khan's grandfather was a prominent intellectual of Bukhara named Alam Shaikh, who traced his descent to renowned saint Shihabuddin Suhrawardi (d. 1234).

== Career ==
=== Reign of Aurangzeb ===
Mir Shihab-ud-Din arrived in Mughal India around 1670, during the reign of Mughal emperor Aurangzeb. Accepted into the court, he was soon deployed as a commander in several military campaigns of the Deccan. He received the title 'Ghaziuddin Khan Bahadur' in 1684 due to his successes fighting against the Marathas. He additionally received the title 'Firuz Jang' (victorious in battle) in 1685. He also distinguished himself in 1681 by performing a dangerous mission during the rebellion of Aurangzeb's fourth son, prince Muhammad Akbar.

In 1685, he participated in the Siege of Bijapur, and was credited with the campaign's success. He was particularly recognised for leading a difficult expedition during this campaign, to relieve a trapped and starving army led by prince Azam, Aurangzeb's third son. For his action he was rewarded with the Mahi Maratib (fish standard), and received the title 'farzand-i arjomand' (distinguished son). A year later, he captured the city of Adoni.

In 1687, he fought in the Siege of Golconda and capture of Hyderabad, in which campaign his father Abid Khan died. During this campaign, he alerted the emperor Aurangzeb of collusion between his second son, prince Muazzam, and the enemy (the Golconda Sultanate). He also played a significant part in the subsequent arrest of Muazzam and his four sons. According to historian Satish Chandra, Ghaziuddin Khan lost his eyesight in 1686 due to bubonic plague in Hyderabad; however, Ebba Koch asserts that he lost his eyesight in 1690, and attributes this to a plague during the Siege of Bijapur. After he was blinded, he was allowed to continue his career in the Mughal military and administration.

Beginning in the late 1680s, the nobles of Aurangzeb's court were split into two rival factions: Ghaziuddin Khan and his son Chin Qilich Khan (later Nizam of Hyderabad) were leaders of one group, while the other group was headed by Asad Khan (wazir or chief minister of the empire) and his son Zulfiqar Khan. Key members of the first faction were Ghaziuddin Khan, his son Chin Qilich Khan, his cousin Muhammad Amin Khan, and two other sons of his, Hamid Khan Bahadur and Rahimuddin Khan.

In 1698, Ghaziuddin Khan was appointed governor of Berar Subah, a province of the empire. He held this governorship for the rest of Aurangzeb's reign, and played an active role in defending the province from Maratha assaults. In 1704, Feroze Jung routed a Maratha army that was besieging Sironj.

=== War of Succession ===
In the early 1700s, as emperor Aurangzeb's death loomed, Ghaziuddin Khan (along with Chin Qilich Khan and Muhammad Amin) decided to stay neutral in any potential war of succession among the princes. Ghaziuddin Khan and other members of the family also began to stockpile arms, in anticipation of aggression from the princes. Historian Munis Faruqui describes their policy as one of 'armed neutrality', and notes that previously in Mughal history, nobles had never been allowed to stay neutral in succession conflicts.

The succession struggle was kicked off when the aged emperor died in 1707, at the imperial camp in Ahmadnagar; the prince Azam Shah subsequently crowned himself emperor there. Ghaziuddin Khan was repeatedly asked to join Azam Shah in the coming battle against prince Muazzam, to no success. Ghaziuddin remained in Daulatabad, making no move to join Azam. Seeking to stay on good terms with the noble, Azam Shah styled him governor of Aurangabad and Viceroy of the Deccan, sending him several gifts.

=== Reign of Bahadur Shah ===
Aurangzeb's second son, prince Muazzam, emerged victorious in the war of succession and was crowned as emperor Bahadur Shah. Ghaziuddin Khan and his family were pardoned and rewarded by the emperor despite their lack of support in the war, possibly due to their military value. Ghaziuddin Khan was made governor of Gujarat Subah by the emperor, replacing Ibrahim Khan. Ghaziuddin Khan began attempts to stabilise the province, by appointing fifty spies to report on rebel Rajputs and Marathas (who occupied the northern and southern frontiers of the province respectively). However, his efforts were cut short by his death in 1710, marking the close of his tenure at a mere two years.

During Bahadur Shah's reign, Ghaziuddin Khan was also dispatched to combat recalcitrant Rajput rajas, for which purpose he was made the absentee governor of Ajmer on 12 April 1708 (he was dismissed shortly after and reappointed on 15 June).

== Death ==
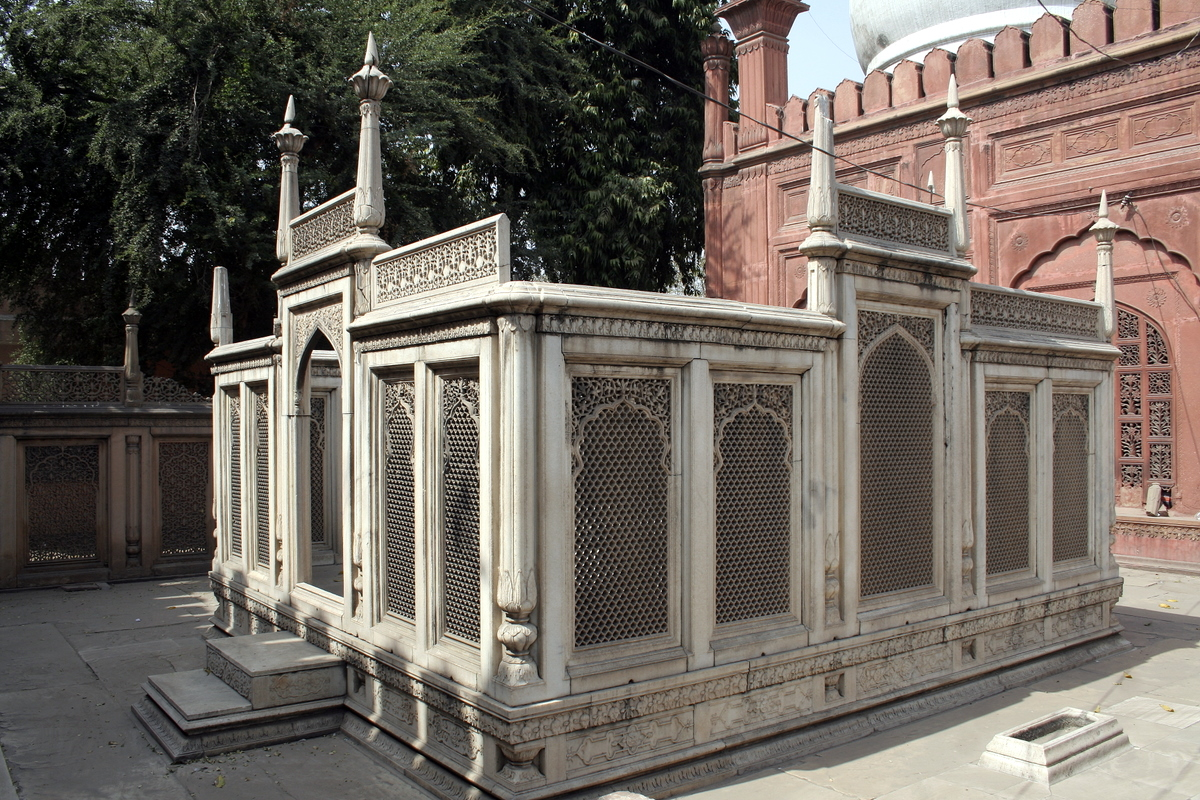
Tomb of Ghaziuddin Khan, in the Ghaziuddin Madrasa complex

Ghaziuddin Khan died in Ahmadabad, capital of Gujarat Subah, on 8 December 1710. His body was brought to Delhi, where it was buried at a madrasa complex he had founded during his lifetime (Madrasa Ghaziuddin Khan), located near Delhi's Ajmeri Gate. Following his death, the Mughal state confiscated his assets, as per custom.

== Family ==
Emperor Aurangzeb took an active interest in cultivating Ghaziuddin Khan and his family, perhaps in an effort to gain an ultra-loyal group of nobles. Upon Ghaziuddin's arrival in India, Aurangzeb arranged him a prestigious marriage to Safiya Khanum, daughter of renowned Mughal wazir Saadullah Khan. This honor was in addition to several promotions his father Abid Khan had received prior. The marriage took place in 1670; their first son was Chin Qilich Khan (born Mir Qamaruddin), who Aurangzeb personally named and mentored. He went on to become a major noble of the court, later becoming the first Nizam and founder of Hyderabad State. Ghaziuddin Khan was first cousins with noble Muhammad Amin Khan, who was promoted to the high-ranking position of sadr-us-sudur during Aurangzeb's reign, and later became wazir (prime minister) of the empire. Ghaziuddin Khan also had two other sons: Hamid Khan Bahadur and Rahimuddin Khan.

== Patronage ==
Around the turn of the 18th century, Ghaziuddin Khan founded a madrasa complex today located in Old Delhi, near the Ajmeri Gate. The madrasa was one of Delhi's three main madrasas during the reign of Mughal emperor Bahadur Shah I. It shut down in the 1790s and reopened in 1792 through the patronage of Delhi's wealthy Muslim class. It went on to house colonial education institutions, namely Delhi College and then the Anglo-Arabic school. Since 1948, the building has been in use by Zakir Husain Delhi College. The madrasa complex exemplifies late Mughal architecture, and is one of the few surviving madrasas dating to the Mughal period.

== Bibliography ==
- Fanshawe, H.C. (1998). Delhi: Past and Present. Asian Educational Services. ISBN 978-81-206-1318-8.
- Faruqui, Munis D (2009), "At Empire's End: The Nizam, Hyderabad and Eighteenth-Century India", Modern Asian Studies, 43 (1): 5–43, doi:10.1017/S0026749X07003290, ISSN 0026-749X, JSTOR 20488070, S2CID 146592706
- Faruqui, Munis D (2012), Princes of the Mughal Empire, 1504-1719, Cambridge: Cambridge University Press, ISBN 978-1-139-52619-7, OCLC 808366461
- H.C. Fanshawe (1998). Delhi, past and present. Asian Educational Services. ISBN 81-206-1318-X.
