= Jogendra Sharma =

Jogendra Sharma is a Delhi-based CPI(M) leader. He is a member of the Central Committee of the Communist Party of India (Marxist) and is also a Central Secretariat Member. He was the State Secretary of Delhi CPI(M) from 1985 to 1997. As of 2025, he is member of CPIM Central Secretariat. As of 2026, he is a member of the Central Control Commission of the CPI(M).

He came in contact with the CPM in 1969 through his college teachers, when he was in his 1st year in Delhi College (now Zakir Husain Delhi College) in Delhi University. SFI, Students' Federation of India came into being in 1970 and since the beginning of SFI he worked both on the Students front and the Trade Union front CITU. He went on to work extensively for the Centre of Indian Trade Unions (CITU), formally, from 1977 to 1990.

He also taught Hindi Literature in Swami Shraddhanand College, University of Delhi from 1974 to 1994. He took voluntary retirement as a Hindi Reader from The University of Delhi after 20 years of service in 1994.
