= Ravi Chaturvedi =

Indian sports commentator

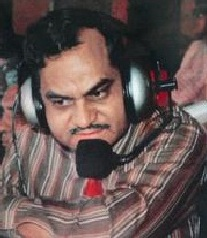
- Chaturvedi in 1987
- Born: 27 July 1937 (age 89); Dalip Nagar, Kanpur, India
- Education: University of Delhi; Czech Academy of Sciences; Chhatrapati Shahu Ji Maharaj University; University of Windsor; Zakir Husain Delhi College
- Occupations: Radio and TV commentator
- Spouse: Chander Mohini Chaturvedi
- Children: Pooja and Manish
- Awards: 1. Padma Shri; 2. Kanpur Ratna; 3. Matu Shri Award; 4. Outstanding Commentator (Delhi); 5. Best Hindi Cricket Commentator Award by Khel Samrat; 6. Member, India International Intellectual Society.

Ravi Chaturvedi is an Indian sports commentator and author of twenty seven books on cricket, including World Cup Cricket: A Compendium. He is known to be first Indian sports commentator in Hindi. He was honoured by the Government of India, in 2012, with the fourth highest Indian civilian award of Padma Shri, Matu Shri and Khel Samrat awards for best Hindi commentator and as educationist offered membership by India International Intellectual Society. He has been on Board of Directors, Delhi District Cricket Association (DDCA), member, Bombay Natural History Society and on the advisory committee of The National Zoology Park.

== Early life and education ==
Chaturvedi was born in Dalip Nagar, Kanpur. In 1945, he moved to Delhi.

He has a BSc (Hons), and a M.Sc. in Zoology (specialization in Fisheries) from Delhi University, a diploma in Microbiology (Virology, Institute of Microbiology) from the Czechoslovak Academy of Sciences, tissue culure training, University of Windsor, Canada.

After retirement, Chaturvedi decided to complete a PhD in Cricket (Physical Education) from CSJM University, Kanpur, which he earned at the age of 83, although he completed the thesis at 78 in 2015.

== Career ==
Chaturvedi was a zoology lecturer at Zakir Husain Delhi College, Delhi University.

In 1960, the government of India decided to have Hindi coverage of all major sporting events. Chaturvedi started commentating in 1961, making his debut as the first Hindi commentator of All India Radio. He has covered 112 Tests and 220 ODIs, apart from other sporting events. He has also been associated with Star Sports, ESPN, TWI, Nimbus Sports, World Tel. New Zealand TV, Doordarshan, Sab TV, Caribbean Broadcasting Corporation, Guardian Radio, Trinidad TV, Radio 360, BBC, Voice of America (VOA) and All India Radio. He has assisted UNESCO and the World Wildlife Fund in an international project Naming of Cricketing Countries based on their Endangered Animal for Fostering Peace, International Understanding and Promoting Environmental Protection.

As a freelance journalist besides cricket, he writes on culture, education, environment protection, wildlife conservation and politics. He has contributed regularly in all major national dailies both in English and Hindi, major sports weeklies of the country and in Australia, England (Wisden) and West-Indies. Through cricket, he has developed abiding interest in Caribbean Cricket and the Indian Diaspora. He is a regular cricket columnist and acts as an expert on Trinity Mirror TV and writes on other facets of social activities of the country in a Chennai based daily Trinity Mirror.

Through his writings in Wisden, he has promoted cricket in Bhutan, Hawaii, Kuwait, Maldives, Malaysia and Singapore. His involvement in various organizations saw him on international platforms; World Assembly of Youth’s (WAY) Annual Conference, Liege, Belgium (1969), WAY Asia-Pacific Population Education Seminar, Singapore (1970) and involvement in Caribbean Indian Diaspora paved way to his being a member of Indian Cultural delegations to Guyana (1988) and Trinidad & Tobago (1995) in connection with celebrations for 150th anniversary of Indian Arrival.

His efforts in 1986 helped to bring electricity to the village of Dalip Nagar. In 2010 and again in 2022, he helped to repair and clean an irrigation canal there.

Chaturvedi has authored twenty seven books on cricket; seventeen in English, five in Hindi and one in Marathi. Some of his notable works are:

- World Cup Cricket: A Compendium
- Millennium's Greatest Indian Cricketers
- Cricket Ke Sitare (The Stars of Cricket)
- The Complete Book of West Indies-India Test Cricket
- Legendary Indian Cricketers (Men, Moments and Memories)
- Cricket Ki Rochak Baten (Cricket - Interesting Facts)
- World Cup Cricket
- Cricket Commentary Kaksh Se (Hindi )
- Cricket in Indian Mythology (Sports in Indian context)
- Cricket commentary and commentators
- Cricket Pauranic Sandarbh (Khel Bhartiya Pakch) (Hindi)

He has also contributed to the book, Sojourners to Settlers, writing on the topic, Contribution of the Indo-West Indians to Caribbean Cricket. He writes editorials and columns for Hindustan Times, an English-language daily from India. He is known to have friendly ties with many deceased and living Test cricketers.

== Selected bibliography ==
- Ravi Chaturvedi (September 2005). World Cup Cricket: A Compendium. Harman Publishing House. p. 648. ISBN 978-8186622797.
- Ravi Chaturvedi (2000). Millennium's greatest Indian cricketers. Saru Prakashan. p. 163. ISBN 978-8187041016.
- Ravi Chaturvedi (2011). Cricket Ke Sitare. Prabhat Publications. p. 259. ISBN 978-8173156311.
- Ravi Chaturvedi. The Complete Book Of West Indies-india Test Cricket. Orient Paperbacks. p. 200.
- Ravi Chaturvedi (2009). Legendary Indian Cricketers (Men, Moments and Memories). New Delhi: Ocean Books. ISBN 9788184300758.
- Ravi Chaturvedi (January 2011). Cricket Ki Rochak Baten. Prabhat Prakashan. ISBN 9789380183510.
- Ravi Chaturvedi (1992). World Cup Cricket. Vikas Publishing. ISBN 9780706961362.

== See also ==
- Cricket in India
- Cricket World Cup
- Journalist
- Sports commentator
- Mayanti Langer
- Kanthi D. Suresh
