= Zakir Husain Delhi College =

College in Delhi, India

Coordinates: 28.6397°N 77.2302°E

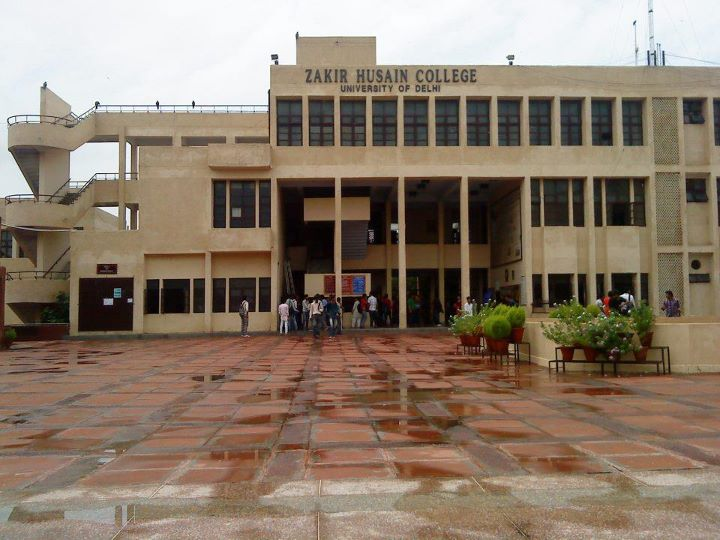
- Former names: Delhi College; Zakir Husain College; Anglo Arabic College
- Motto: Live By Love
- Established: 1696; 330 years ago
- Academic affiliations: University of Delhi
- Principal: Prof. Narendra Singh
- Location: Jawaharlal Nehru Marg,, Delhi, India
- Website: www.zakirhusaindelhicollege.ac.in

Zakir Husain Delhi College (formerly known as Zakir Husain College, Anglo Arabic College, and Delhi College), founded in 1696, is the oldest existing educational institution in India, and is a constituent college of the University of Delhi, accredited with NAAC 'A' grade. The college comprises an area of 150 acres. The college is situated in off campus of University of Delhi. It has had a considerable influence on modern education as well as Urdu and Islamic learning in India, and today remains the only Delhi University college offering BA (Hons) courses in Arabic and Persian.

== History ==
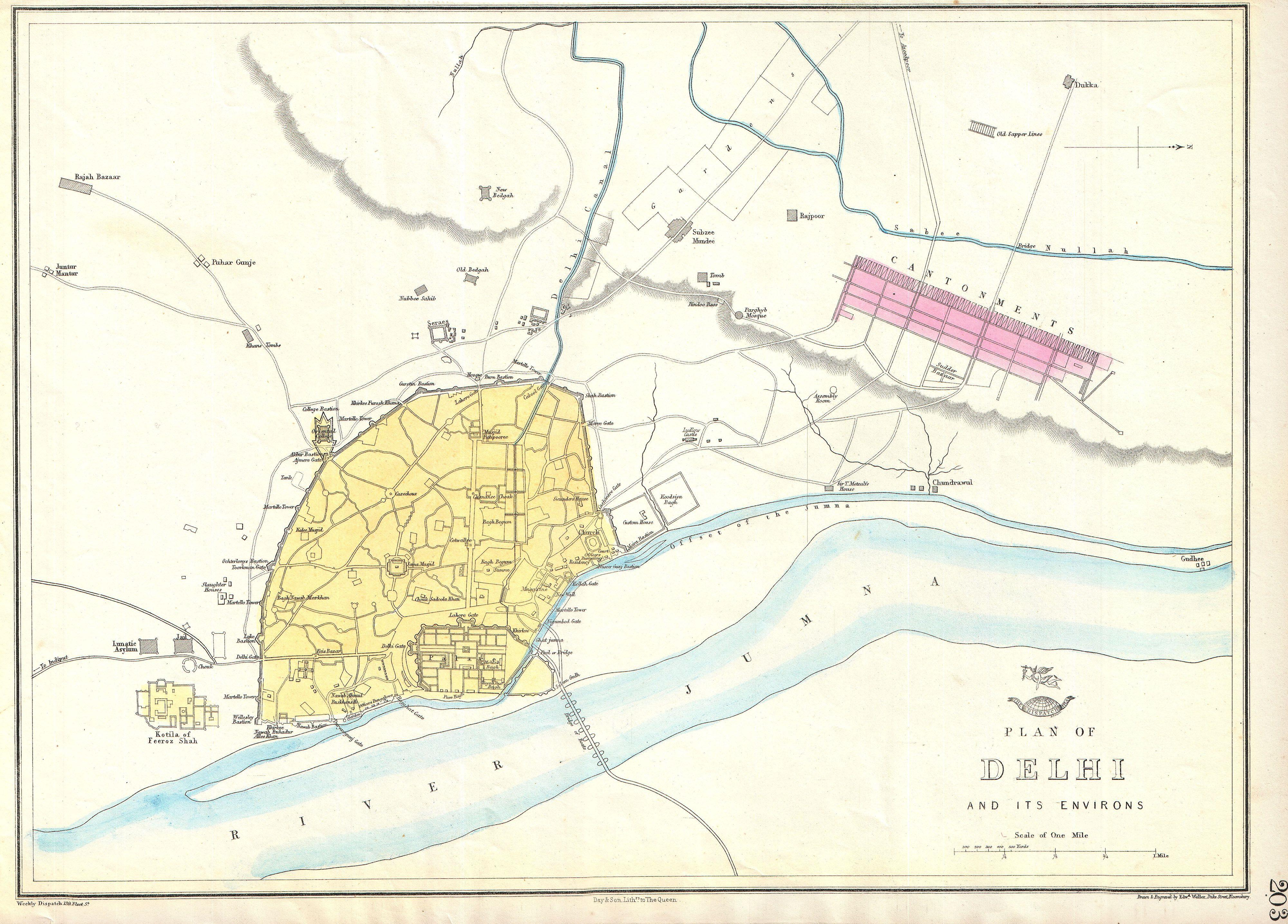
Historic map of Delhi (Shahjahanabad), in 1863, showing it as Oriental College

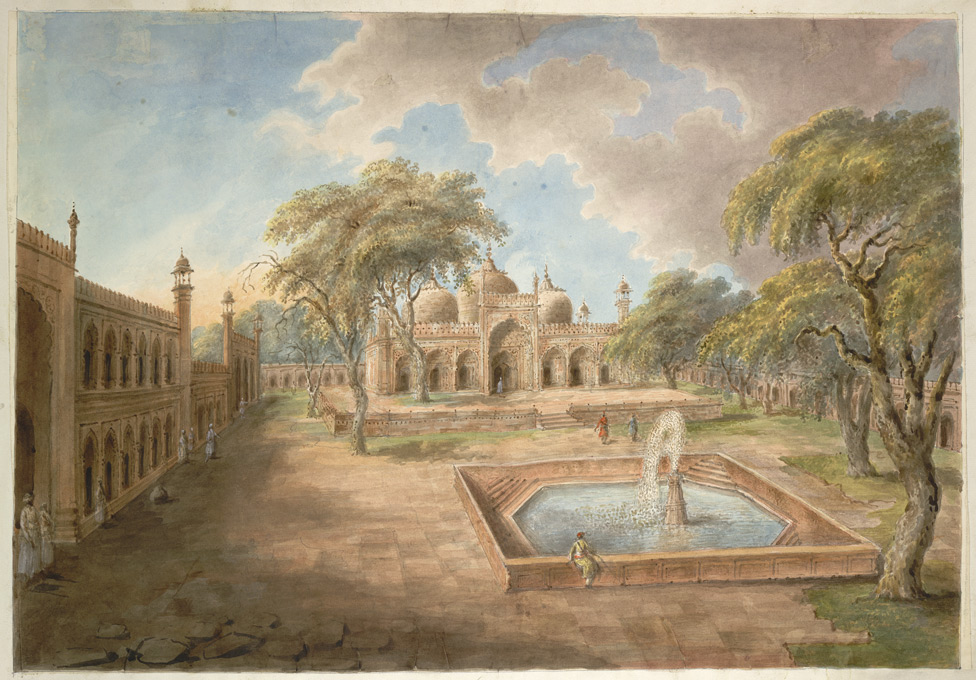
The courtyard of Ghazi al-Din Khan's Madrassah at Delhi, 1814-15

It was initially founded by Ghaziuddin Khan in 1696, a general of Mughal Emperor Aurangzeb, a leading Deccan commander and the father of Qamar-ud-din Khan, Asaf Jah I, the founder of the Asaf Jahi dynasty of Hyderabad, also known as the first Nizam of Hyderabad, in the 1690s, and was originally termed Madrasa Ghaziuddin Khan after him. However, with a weakening Mughal Empire, the Madrasa closed in 1790-1791, but with the support of local nobility, an oriental college for literature, science and art was established at the site in 1792.

It stood just outside the walled city of Delhi outside the Ajmeri Gate, near Paharganj close to the New Delhi railway station. It was originally surrounded by a wall and connected to the walled city fortifications and was referred to as the College Bastion.

It was reorganized as the 'Anglo Arabic College' by the British East India Company in 1828 to provide, in addition to its original objectives, an education in English language and literature.

Rev. Jennings started secret Bible classes in the officially secular Delhi College. In July 1852, two prominent Delhi Hindus, Dr. Chaman Lal, one of Zafar's personal physicians, and his friend Master Ramchandra, a mathematics lecturer at the Delhi College, baptised a public ceremony at St. James' Church, Delhi.

Dr. Sprenger, then principal, presided over the founding of the college press, the Matba‘u ’l-‘Ulum and founded the first college periodical, the weekly Qiranu ’s-Sa‘dain, in 1845.

Another cultural intermediatory was Mohan Lal Kashmiri, diplomat, and author, who worked for the East India Company and was educated at the college.

It was renamed Zakir Husain College in 1975 by Indira Gandhi government after Dr. Zakir Husain, a distinguished educator and a President of India. The college was later shifted to its present building outside Turkman Gate in 1986, the old structure in the Madrasa Ghaziuddin complex, still houses a hostel for the college. It was declared a heritage monument by the ASI in 2002. Then in 2008, a separate archive on its history was set up within the college library, with centuries-old books and documents on display, chronicling its 300-year-old history.

== Governance ==
Zakir Husain Delhi College is run by the Zakir Husain Memorial Trust since 1975.

== Academics ==
Academic programmes

Zakir Husain Delhi College offers science, humanities and commerce as well as language courses.

Undergraduate Programmes:

- B.A. (Hons) Arabic
- B.A. (Hons) Bengali
- B.A. (Hons) English
- B.A. (Hons) Economics
- B.A. (Hons) Hindi
- B.A. (Hons) History
- B.A. (Hons) Persian
- B.A. (Hons) Philosophy
- B.A. (Hons) Political Science
- B.A. (Hons) Psychology
- B.A. (Hons) Sanskrit
- B.A. (Hons) Urdu
- B.A. (Programme)
- B.Com (Hons)
- B.Com (Programme)
- B.Sc. (Hons) Botany
- B.Sc. (Hons) Chemistry
- B.Sc. (Hons) Electronics
- B.Sc. (Hons) Mathematics
- B.Sc. (Hons) Physics
- B.Sc. (Hons) Zoology
- B.Sc. (Hons) Life Sciences
- B.Sc. (Hons) Physical Sciences

Postgraduate Programmes:

- M.A. Arabic
- M.A. Economics
- M.A. English
- M.A. Hindi
- M.A. History
- M.A. Philoshophy
- M.A. Political Science
- M.A. Psychology
- M.A. Sanskrit
- M.A. Urdu
- M.Com
- M.Sc. Botany
- M.Sc. Chemistry
- M.Sc. Mathematics
- M.Sc. Physics
- M.Sc. Zoology

Mirza Mehmood Begg Library and Book Bank

The college has a library possessing about 1,18,462 books. It runs on open shelf system but some important text books are also kept in reserve section. It not only caters to the academic requirements but also houses leisure books and books to increase general awareness. The library is named after the college principal Mirza Mehmood Begg.

Salman Gani Hashmi Auditorium

The college has an auditorium with a seating capacity of 417 persons. Various cultural programmes, lectures and college annual function are also organised in this auditorium. This auditorium is named after the former college principal Salman Gani Hashmi.

College Archives

The Delhi College Archives, situated in a section of the M. M. Begg Library, was inaugurated by Professor Sabyasachi Bhattacharya, chairman, Indian Council of Historical Research, on 18 February 2008.

The archives contain a large number of files relating to the college and significant developments in higher education in Delhi and North India from 1823 onwards. These have been located within the National Archives of India and the Delhi Archives, and analyzed over the last couples of years.

Original writings by teachers and alumni of the college in Urdu, Persian and English are also available in the archives. Text books prepared and/or used during the 19th Century for instruction in mathematics, history, geography, philosophy, literature etc., are on display. The archives also contains secondary sources and books relating to Delhi College and the intellectual ferment in Delhi region during the 18th and 19th centuries.

== Student life ==
Zakir Husain Memorial Lecture

A major annual event in the college calendar is the Zakir Husain Memorial Lecture to commemorate Dr. Zakir Husain. The speaker is an eminent personality of his field. It is organized in the 1st week of February. Zakir Husain Memorial Lecture is organized since 2006 annually. The lecture has been delivered by the following persons so far:

- Aruna Roy (2006)
- Professor Sukhadeo Thorat (2007)
- Intizar Hussain (2008)
- Hamid Ansari (2009)
- Professor B. B. Bhattacharya (2010)
- Soli Sorabjee (2011)
- Professor C. M. Naim (2012)
- Professor V.S. Chauhan (2013)

Convocation Ceremony

This is the only constituent college of the University of Delhi which holds an annual convocation ceremony. Although, due to the ongoing construction of a new building in the college, the college ground remains occupied as a result of which the ceremony wasn't held since 2017.

Swadeshi event

The college hosted a special lecture on 2nd April, 2026 entitled "Vartamaan Vaishvik Paridrishya Mein Swadeshi Ki Bhumika" at Salman Ghani Hashmi Auditorium. The programme was jointly organised by two society clubs -Vimarsh and Pratibimb - The Political Science Society. The event focused on the concept of Swadeshi, self-reliance, and indigenous production in the contemporary global context,

Society Clubs:

The Morning College:

- The Placement Cell
- Aman-The Dramatics Society
- Psychedelics-The Psychology Society
- Nargis-The Botanical Society
- Illume-The Western Music Society
- Dr. B.R. Ambedkar Research Centre
- Avaam-The Political Science Society
- The North East Society
- Quintessence-The Quizzing Society
- Debsoc-The English Debating Society
- National Service Scheme
- National Cadet Corps
- Dhanak- The Western Dance Society
- Nafs-The Mental Health Society
- Delzak-The Model United Nation Society
- The English Literary Society
- The Hindi Sahitya Sabha
- Asmi-The Girls Association
- Nrityathi-The Classical and Folk Dance Society
- Ecosoc-The Economics Society
- The Arabic Society
- Enactus-The Social Entrepreneurship Society
- Gandhi Study Circle
- The Hindi Debating Society
- The Monist-Philosophy department Society
- Aranya-The Nature and Environment Society
- Chimera-The Film and Photography Society
- Physiomistry-The Physical Science Society
- Comsoc-The Commerce Society
- ZHDC Football Club
- Arts and Culture Society

The Evening College:

- Economica-The Economics Society
- The Placement Cell
- Rhythmix-The Dance Society
- Panchtatva-The Nature and Environment Society
- Sarmaya-The Commerce Society
- Aawaz-The Debating Society
- Aaghaaz- The Theatre Society
- Arts and Culture Society
- Samanvaya-The B.A. Programme Society
- Antiquity-The History Society
- Chhavi-The Film and Photography Society
- National Service Scheme
- National Cadet Corps
- Pratimbimb-The Political Science Society
- The English Literary Society
- DR. B.R. Ambedkar Research Centre
- Gandhi Study Circle
- The Arabic Society
- Bazm e adab-The Urdu Literary Society
- Mystique-The Fashion Society
- Swarit-The Music Society
- Enactus-The Social Entrepreneurship Society
- ICCHE-The Bengali Literary Society
- Neetisaar-The Civil Service Society
- Anjuman e Farsi-The Persion Society

== Notable people ==
The notable and alumni and faculty of the college includes:

- Muhammad Qasim Nanautawi, a founder of Darul Uloom Deoband
- Rashid Ahmad Gangohi, a founder of Darul Uloom Deoband
- Sir Syed Ahmed Khan, the founder of Aligarh Muslim University
- Deputy Nazir Ahmed, an Urdu essayist and ICS
- Ali Sardar Jafri, Indian writer of Urdu language, poet, critic and film lyricist
- Shamim Karhani, Urdu language revolutionary poet
- Akhtar ul-Iman, Urdu poet and screenwriter in Hindi cinema, influenced nazm
- Ravi Chaturvedi, the first Hindi cricket commentator, he was also a faculty member in zoology department
- Masud Husain Khan, Indian linguist
- J N Dixit, defence analyst
- Gopi Chand Narang, Urdu/Persian critic
- Harsh Vardhan, government minister
- Jagdish Tytler, Indian politician
- Vikas Divyakirti, Indian Entrepreneur, Co Founder of Dhristi IAS
- Sikandar Bakht, Indian politician
- Bhisham Sahni, professor of the English department, noted writer and dramatist
- Mamluk Ali Nanautawi, scholar whose descendants founded Darul Uloom Deoband, served as the head teacher of the college; taught Arabic at the college during the 1830s
- Mrinal Dutt, Indian actor
- Chandan Roy Sanyal, Indian actor
- Zain Khan Durrani, Indian actor and poet
- Nitish Mishra, Indian politician
- Shoaib Iqbal, Indian politician
- Haroon Yusuf, Indian politician
- Shahid Siddiqui, Indian journalist, author and politician
- Jogendra Sharma, Indian politician
- Mahesh Sharma, Indian politician
- Ramchundra, Indian mathematician
- Zulfiqar Ali Deobandi, Indian Islamic scholar, educator and writer
- Muhammad Mazhar Nanautawi, Indian Islamic scholar and freedom struggle activist
- Fazlur Rahman Usmani, Indian Islamic scholar, poet and Co-Founder of Darul Uloom Deoband
- Khurshid Ahmad, Pakistani economist, philosopher, politician and Islamic activist
- Muhammad Hasan Askari, Pakistani scholar, literary critic, writer and linguist of modern urdu language

== See also ==
- Mohan Lal Kashmiri
- List of colleges affiliated with the University of Delhi
- Anglo Arabic Senior Secondary School another descendant of the original institution
