= Ramchundra =

British Indian mathematician (1821–1880)

- Ramachandra Lal
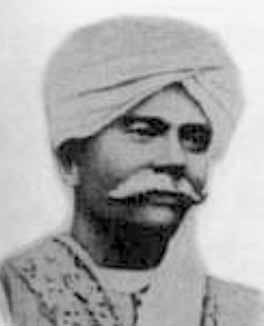
- Born: c. 1821
- Died: 1880
- Scientific career
- Fields: Mathematics

Ramchundra (Ramachandra Lal) (Devanagari,रामचन्द्र लाल) (c. 1821–1880) was a British Indian mathematician. His book, Treatise on Problems of Maxima and Minima, was promoted by mathematician Augustus De Morgan.

Writing in his preface to the treatise, De Morgan states that Ramchundra was born in about 1821 in Panipat to Sunder Lal, a Kayasth of Delhi. He came to De Morgan’s attention when, in 1850, a friend sent him Ramchundra’s work on maxima and minima. The 29-year-old self-taught mathematician had published the book at his own expense in Calcutta in that year. De Morgan was so impressed that he arranged for the book to be republished in London under his own supervision, and in general undertook to bring Ramchundra's work to the notice of the broader European scientific community. Quoting De Morgan, from the preface of the treatise:

On examining this work I saw in it, not merely merit worthy of encouragement, but merit of a peculiar kind, the encouragement of which, as it appeared to me, was likely to promote native effort towards the restoration of the native mind in India.

Charles Muses, in an article in the Mathematical Intelligencer (1998) called Ramchundra "De Morgan's Ramanujan". He was mystified why, in spite of De Morgan's efforts to make this "remarkable Hindu algebraist known, he does not appear in most texts on history of mathematics. He is also known for his great ability to calculate."

Ramchundra was teacher of science in Delhi College for some time. In 1858, he was native head master in Thomason Civil Engineering College (now Indian Institute of Technology, Roorkee) at Roorkee. Later that year, he was appointed head master of a school in Delhi.
