= Sironj =

Sironj Sengar Raj
- Town
- Location in Madhya Pradesh, India
- Coordinates: 24.1°N 77.7°E
- Country: India
- State: Madhya Pradesh
- District: Vidisha
- Founder: Shankar Singh Sengar in 1103 A.D.
- Elevation: 464 m (1,522 ft)

Population (2011-03-01)
  - Total: 52,460

Languages
  - Official: Hindi
- Time zone: UTC+5:30 (IST)
- Postal code: 464228

Sironj is a town and a municipality in Vidisha district in the Indian state of Madhya Pradesh. Its also a Tehsil Headquarter.

== History ==
Sironj was previously known as Sengar Raj.It was founded by Sengar Rajput warrior Shankar Singh in 1103 A.D. Due to ruling dynasty it was called Sengar Raj later name corrupted to become Sironj. Shankar Singh Sengar with his 2 brothers established Sengar Raj in Malwa. Shankar Singh founded Basilgarh fort in Sironj. Other two brothers Girdhar Singh founded Girdharpur Village constructed Kokangarh fort and Rana Singh founded Ranapur Village constructed kokangarh fort. Remnants of these forts can be still found nearby Sironj and Lateri.

Sironj was under the control of Rajputs till 18th century.After ascending the throne Aurangzeb attacked Sironj, Ruling Sengar Rajputs fought valiantly and around 4,000 Sengars were killed fighting the battle.Only few of them left alive after battle. Later Hoklars accorded sironj to Pashtun Amir khan for his service later who became Tonk Nawab in 1806 and then aligned with Britishers in 1857.

It is a historically laden city that lies northwest of Vidisha. The town of Sironj was a Jain pilgrimage centre on the periphery of Bundelkhand. Sironj is about 85 kilometres from the town of Vidisha and is famous for its many shrines, temples and mosques. The Jama Masjid in Sironj is believed to be built by the Mughal Emperor Aurangzeb in the 17th century. One can also see the ruins of the observatory, built to measure the height of Mount Everest during the 18th century.

The Giridhari Temple in Sironj is assigned to the 11th century AD.It was built by Sengar Rajput ruler Girdhari Singh.The temple contains a inscription dated to 12th century about the rule of Sengar Rajput in Malwa. The inscription gives details about its Constructor Girdhari Singh Sengar who was a great devotee of Vishnu.

Other marvels are the old and pristine temples of Jatashankar and Mahamaya. Madan Mohan Temple is one of the ancient temples in the country. Sironj is famous for textiles like muslin and calicos. It is considered to be the oldest town in India.

== Geography ==
Sironj is located at 24.10°N 77.69°E. It has an average elevation of 483 metres (1584 feet). Sironj is located on 115 km away from Bhopal.

== Demographics ==
As of 2001 India census, Sironj had a population of 52,100. Males constitute 53% of the population and females 47%. Sironj has an average literacy rate of 67%, higher than the national average of 59.5%: male literacy is 62%, and female literacy is 47%. In Sironj, 17% of the population is under 6 years of age.

== Sironj assembly ==
Sironj Assembly constituency is one of the 230 Vidhan Sabha (Legislative Assembly) constituencies of Madhya Pradesh state in central India. This constituency came into existence in 1957, as one of the Vidhan Sabha constituencies of Madhya Pradesh state.

== College and Institute ==
- Techno Global University, Sironj
- Laal Bahadur Shasti PG College, Sironj
- Govt Politecnic College, Sironj

== Places of Attraction ==
- Jinodaya jain temple
- Sironj Mahal
- Sironj Dam
- Mahamai mata Mandir

== Transportation ==
Sironj is 115 km away from Bhopal and well connected with roads.

The nearest Railway Station is Ganjbasoda 40km from Sironj.

The nearest airport is Bhopal Airport 110km From Sironj.
