= Anglo Arabic Senior Secondary School =

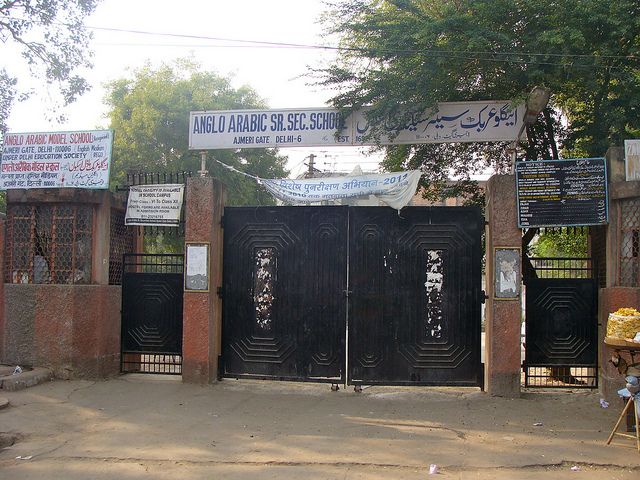
- The school's main entrance

Location
- Ajmeri Gate; Old Delhi, Delhi, 110006; India; 28.6460°N 77.2229°E

Information
- Other name: Anglo Arabic School, Delhi
- School type: Government-aided school
- Motto: Find a Way or Make One
- Established: 1692; 334 years ago
- Status: Operating
- Educational authority: CBSE
- School number: 2778035
- School code: 01228
- Grades: 6th through 12th
- Gender: Coeducational
- Language: English; Urdu; Hindi; Arabic; Persian
- Campus type: Urban
- Website: angloarabic.co.in

Anglo Arabic Senior Secondary School, commonly known as Anglo Arabic School, is a co-educational government-aided school located near Ajmeri Gate in Old Delhi, India. The institution traces its origins to Madrasa Ghaziuddin Khan, established in 1692 by the Mughal nobleman and military commander Ghazi ud-Din Khan Feroze Jung I. The educational complex subsequently housed several institutions over the centuries. The Anglo-Arabic School was established in 1872 and later moved to the historic Ajmeri Gate site. It closed during the Partition of India in 1947 and reopened in 1948.

The school is managed by the Delhi Education Society and is affiliated with the Central Board of Secondary Education (CBSE). It provides secondary and senior secondary education at the historic Ajmeri Gate site.

== History ==
=== Madrasa Ghaziuddin Khan ===
The educational history of the Ajmeri Gate site predates the establishment of the Anglo-Arabic School. In 1692, Mughal nobleman and military commander Ghazi ud-Din Khan established Madrasa Ghaziuddin Khan in Delhi. He served under the Mughal emperor Aurangzeb and was the father of Asaf Jah I, who founded the Asaf Jahi dynasty of Hyderabad.

The madrasa occupied a site near Ajmeri Gate, on the outskirts of the historic walled city of Shahjahanabad. The site subsequently became associated with other educational institutions, including Delhi College. Over time, the institutions operating there underwent changes in their names, organisation and educational programmes.

=== Establishment of the Anglo-Arabic School ===
The Anglo-Arabic School was established in 1872. According to the historical account published in The School at Ajmeri Gate: Delhi's Educational Legacy, the school originated as an Arabic Middle School established under the Itimad-ud-Daulah Fund. It initially operated in Chandni Mahal because the historic Ghaziuddin madrasa building at Ajmeri Gate was being used as a police establishment following the events of 1857.

In 1889, the school moved to the historic building of Ghaziuddin Khan's madrasa near Ajmeri Gate. Its relocation connected the school with the older educational complex and established its association with the site where it continues to operate.

=== Development during the colonial period ===
During the late nineteenth and early twentieth centuries, the institution developed its educational activities. The associated college expanded its academic programme, and degree classes were introduced in 1929. The school and college shared an institutional history, although their subsequent development followed separate paths.

The college's development included changes in its curriculum and administration. Its history formed part of the broader evolution of education in Delhi during the colonial period.

=== Partition and reopening ===
The Partition of India in 1947 disrupted the institution's activities. According to the historical account by Azra Razzack and M. Atyab Siddiqui, the Anglo-Arabic schools and college closed in 1947. The school reopened at Ajmeri Gate in 1948, while the college resumed its activities as Delhi College.

The reopening marked a new phase in the school's history in independent India. The school continued at the Ajmeri Gate site, while the college developed separately and eventually became Zakir Husain Delhi College.

=== Development as a senior secondary school ===
Following changes in the school education system, the institution came to be known as Anglo Arabic Senior Secondary School. It continues to provide secondary and senior secondary education at Ajmeri Gate. Its historical development and place in the educational history of Old Delhi are documented in The School at Ajmeri Gate: Delhi's Educational Legacy, published by Oxford University Press in 2022.

== Administration and education ==
Anglo Arabic Senior Secondary School is a government-aided institution managed by the Delhi Education Society and affiliated with the Central Board of Secondary Education. The CBSE affiliation record identifies it as a senior secondary school located at Ajmeri Gate, Delhi.

The school provides co-educational instruction from classes VI to XII. Its institutional information lists English, Urdu, Hindi, Arabic and Persian among the languages associated with the school.

== Notable alumni ==
- Sir Syed Ahmad Khan, educator and founder of Aligarh Muslim University
- Meem Afzal, journalist, politician and diplomat
- Mirza Masood, field hockey player and Olympian

== See also ==
- Zakir Husain Delhi College
- Madrasa Ghaziuddin Khan
