= Madrasa Ghaziuddin Khan =

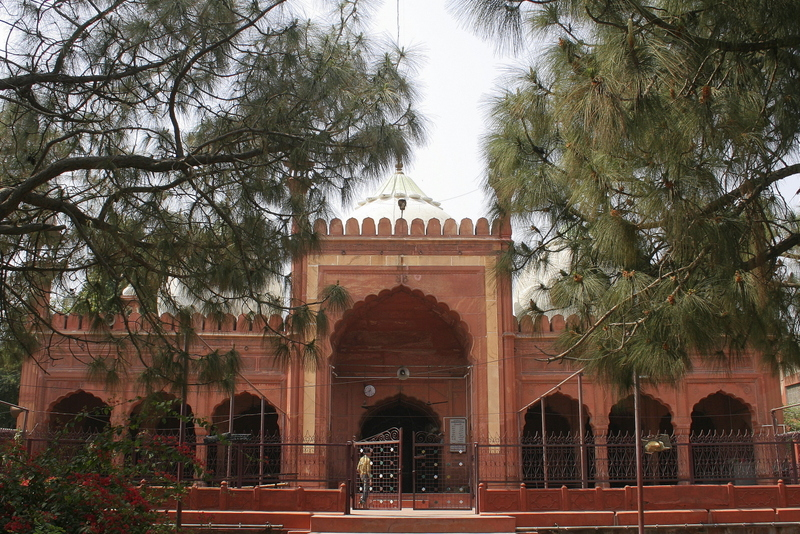
- The mosque in the courtyard of Madrasa Ghaziuddin Khan
- Interactive map of the Madrasa Ghaziuddin Khan area

General information
- Architectural style: Mughal
- Location: Old Delhi, India
- Coordinates: 28°38′45″N 77°13′19″E
- Current tenants: Zakir Husain Delhi College

Dimensions
- Diameter: 69.49m x 96.20m

Design and construction
- Architect: Ghaziuddin Khan

Madrasa Ghaziuddin Khan is a historical madrasa complex located by the Ajmeri Gate in Old Delhi, India. It was founded in 1696 by Ghaziuddin Khan I, a leading noble of the Mughal Empire. Following the discontinuation of its original function as a madrasa, it successively housed colonial-era educational institutions, such as Delhi College and the Anglo-Arabic school. Today, the Zakir Husain Delhi College operates in its premises, making the madrasa the oldest continuing educational centre in the city of Delhi.

The structure is one of the few surviving historical madrasas in India, and one of even fewer madrasas dating back to the Mughal period. The complex also contains a mosque, and the tomb of Ghaziuddin Khan. The complex is an example of later Mughal architecture - it displays Central Asian inspiration in its format, and Shah Jahani elements in its scheme.

== History ==
The early history of the madrasa is obscure. While older British sources date the founding of the madrasa to 1792, modern scholars agree that it was founded earlier, likely around the turn of the 18th century. The madrasa was founded by Ghaziuddin Khan I (also referred to by his titles Bahadur and Feroze Jung), a noble who rose to prominence during the reign of Mughal emperor Aurangzeb. According to historian Margrit Pernau, the structure was likely completed by Ghaziuddin Khan's grandson, Ghaziuddin Khan II.

Little is known of the functioning of the madrasa. It was one of three major madrasas operating during the reign of Aurangzeb's successor, emperor Bahadur Shah, and was funded privately. The madrasa was closed in the 1790s for lack of funds, but was reopened in 1792, financially supported by wealthy Muslims of Delhi.

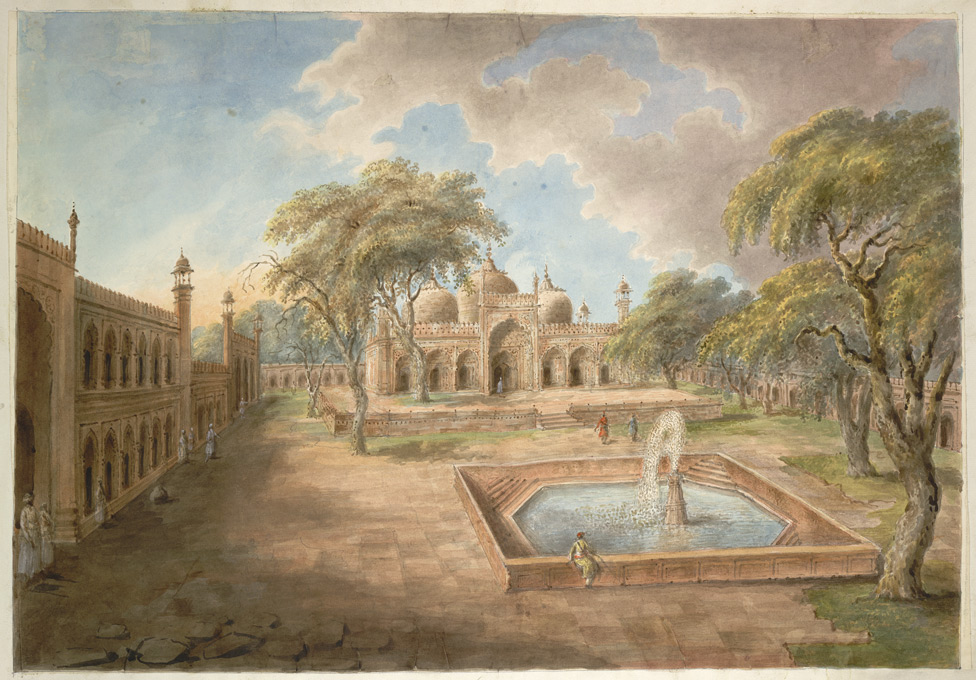
The courtyard of Ghazi al-Din Khan's Madrassah at Delhi. Watercolour by Sitaram, circa 1814-1815

In 1803, the British took control of Delhi from the Marathas. They found that the madrasa was in use as a Maratha headquarters, and deemed the structure a security threat due to its proximity to the Ajmeri Gate. Demolition was considered, but instead the madrasa was incorporated into the walls of Shahjahanabad as a bastion. In 1824, repairs of the madrasa complex were conducted, following which in 1825, a government oriental college named Delhi College was established on its premises. Delhi College operated in the madrasa complex until 1849, when it was shifted to a different location. Following the Indian Mutiny of 1857, British police occupied the premises until 1889, after which the Anglo-Arabic school began operating in the building.

In the aftermath of Indian independence and the Partition in 1947, a section of the premises was used for two years as a Pakistani refugee camp. In 1948, Zakir Husain and Maulana Abul Kalam Azad revived the site as a school, which today operates as Zakir Husain Delhi College.

== Architecture ==
The complex of Madrasa Ghaziuddin Khan is one of the few extant Mughal madrasas (others are the Khair-ul-Manazil and the madrasa at Sheikh Chilli's Tomb). It is also one of the few historical madrasas found in India; Ebba Koch reasons that schools may have instead been integrated with mosques, and Subhash Parihar adds that dedicated madrasa buildings were used for the specific function of educating ulema rather than for primary education. The conceptualization of the complex as a four-iwan madrasa-cum-mosque, recalls Central Asian madrasas such as the Ulugh Beg Madrasa (perhaps owing to Ghaziuddin Khan's Bukharan origin). According to Koch, the design scheme also draws on precedents set by Shah Jahani architecture (architecture of Mughal emperor Shah Jahan's reign), while the stylistic elements are characteristic of later Mughal architecture. Scholar Catherine Asher argues that the location of the structure beyond the walls of Shahjahanabad, and the lack of earlier Mughal structures in the area, suggests that this area was undeveloped at the time of construction.

According to Koch, much of the madrasa has preserved its original design. The complex is a rectangular, symmetrical courtyard building (measuring 69.49x96.20m) of three wings; it consists of a main entrance portal, a mosque at the western side (acting as the fourth wing), and an enclosure containing the tomb of Ghaziuddin on the southern side. Each wing, and the mosque itself, is punctuated by an iwan. The three wings are two-storeyed, and are filled with domed hujras (cells). The eastern wing (entrance side) is twice as long as the north and south wings, and features the main entrance portal. The wings are faced with plaster.

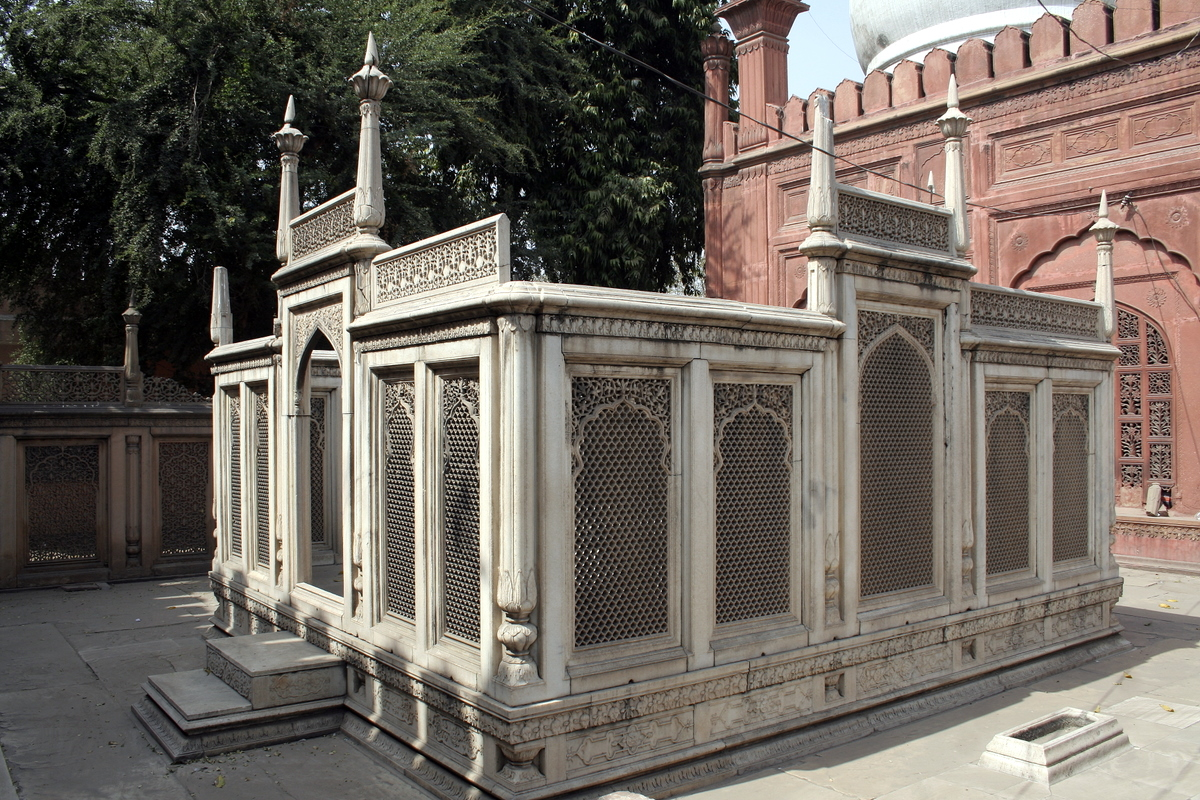
The tomb enclosure of Ghaziuddin Khan.

The mosque is freestanding and faced with red sandstone - it lies on the western end of the complex. It features three domes, and is situated on a raised terrace. The mosque building also contains several halls featuring distinctive pillars. The architecture of the mosque draws from a mosque type established during the reign of emperor Shah Jahan, represented by examples in Delhi like the Jama Masjid, Fatehpuri Masjid, and the Zeenat-ul-Masajid.

An enclosure at the southern side houses the tomb of Ghaziuddin Khan, who was buried in the complex following his death in 1710. The structure is a double enclosure of jali screens, with the outer one made of sandstone and the inner one made of marble. Its form is similar to those of tombs used for the burial of Mughal royals during this time period.
