= Mubariz Khan =

Mughal Governor

Governor of Golconda
- Reign: Farrukhsiyar
- Tenure: 1713 – 1724
- Other names: Amanat Khan
- Born: Khawaja Mohammad; Balkh
- Died: Shakar Kheda (present Buldhana district, Maharashtra)
- Wars and battles: Battle of Shakar Kheda †
- Spouse: Inayat Khan Kashmiri

Mubariz Khan was the Mughal governor of Gujarat and Hyderabad Subah. He was the governor of Golconda from 1713 to 1724 until he was killed during the Battle of Shakar Kheda where he fought against Nizam-ul-Mulk, Asaf Jah I. His is known to have ruled Golconda with a free hand and brought it under stable rule from constant Maratha Raids to extract Chauth. He is generally described as a proto-dynastic figure by John F. Richards.

== Early life ==
Mubariz Khan, a Turani officer under the service of Aurangzeb, was born as Khwaja Mohammad in Balkh. Of a relative obscure background, he entered the Mughal service as a clerk and got employment in various courts, but he soon got his big career break when he married the daughter of Inayat Khan Kashmiri, a noble in the favour of Aurangzeb. His brother-in-law was Sayyid Dilawar Ali Khan Barha, a nephew and a partisan of the Sayyid Brothers. He was appointed as the Bakshi of Prince Kam Baksh and later Faujdar of Sangamner. In the year 1703-1704 of Aurangzeb's reign, he was given the title Amanat Khan and was appointed as the faujdar of Baizapur. His highest ranking was 1500(Zat) during Aurangzeb's rule. During the reign of Bahadur Shah, he was given the charge of Surat and later became governor of Gujarat after the demise of Firuz Jang. He was removed from Gujarat to Malwa during Jahandar Shah's reign. He received the title of Shahamat Khan. It was in 1713 that he was appointed as the governor of Hyderabad during Farrukhsiyar's reign. He was given the title of Mubariz Khan with which he was later to be known.

== Governor of Golconda ==
When he was given the charge of governor, he was given with much more powers than his predecessors in administering the province. With the death of Aurangzeb, Golconda lost its prominence and splendour was subjected to numerous plunder raids by the Marathas to extract Chauth. The rise in social banditry resulted in the decline of trade. Its governors had proven a failure in putting a check on its decline but Mubariz Khan was someone with a difference.

Upon taking up his charge, he was given the charge of Srikakulam which was under the charge of a renegade faujdar named Abid Khan who was ruling it with autonomy. Unlike various governors he began to bring back Golconda into stable Mughal rule. In the early months of 1714, he defeated a Maratha raid party near Hyderabad in which the raiders suffered 150 dead and 100 as casualties. He also drove off Krishna Malhar, the Maratha chief who was occupying Elgandel town.

Mubariz Khan in his efforts to bring back Mughal rule resorted to, extreme violence. An incident will suffice to indicate his position vis-a-vis opponents. A local Telugu Nayak named Venkat held the fort of Changapettah. Mubariz at first laid a 40-day siege to the fort in the thick hot summer and personally ordered for an assault on the fort. In the thick of the battle, Venkat and his son-in-law Birmal was killed. The Army of Islam (Laskar-I-Islam) took 400 prisoners and suffered 260 dead, 350 injured as casualties. To proclaim his victory he erected in true Central Asian fashion a tower of skulls to instill fear to his opponents and to the locals. Changapettah and its fort was renamed as Farrukhnagar and the decapitated trunk of Venkat was crushed by the feet of an elephant and the severed head of Venkat was sent to the Mughal Emperor at Delhi.

When Hussain Ali Khan Barha was appointed as viceroy of Deccan, he was met with hostilities of the local imperial agents (Daud Khan Panni for one instance) .This was due to letters sent by Farrukhsiyar to officials to not co-operate with the Sayyid. Instead of joining the emperor's side, Mubariz Khan joined the Sayyid's side . In December 1715, Mubariz Khan went to Aurangabad to meet Hussain Ali Khan and he got the confirmation of the Governorship of Golconda and he was appointed as Diwan which gave him more powers to control and exact revenue. This resulted in the total abdication of the central Mughal regime from the financial structure of Golconda.

With the consolidation of power, Mubariz Khan began to punish the local zamindars for their delay in payments of tax. He moved from his capital to Vijayawada to punish them. By January 1717, in Gollapalle, he confined all Zamindars that came to his camp obediently and Khan only released them when the promise of payment was secured. He also began an expedition into the Eluru, Khammam and Kondapalli districts to obtain submission from the chiefs. Over a nine-month period Mubariz Khan led his army in a great circular route: north-east to Polavaram on the Godavari; up the Godavari to Bhadrachalam, the temple town; south-west away from the river to Paloncha; to the east to Chennur, Narasimharapalam, and finally back to Rajahmundry, and by the end of the year to Eluru again.

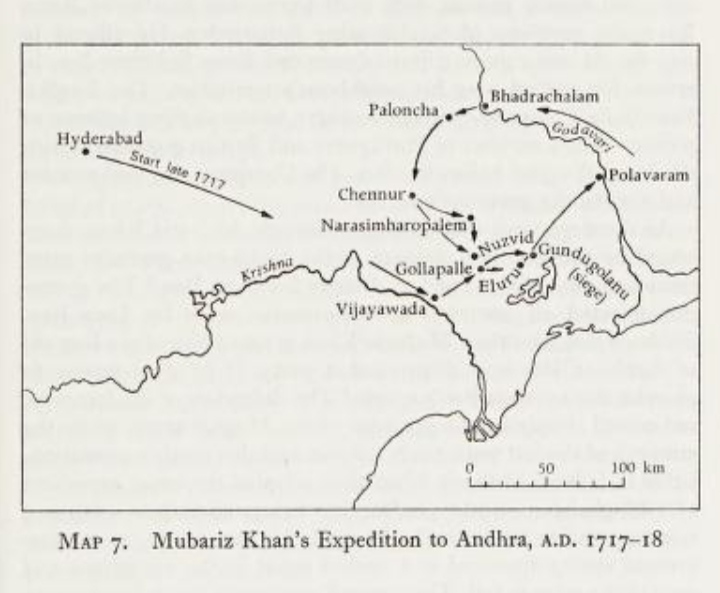

Mubariz Khan targeted the rising Velama House. He forced two brothers Appa Rao and Subbanna Rao to pay their arrears. Of these two brothers, Subbanna was less forthcoming and refused to offer 81,000 rupees as tribute. This enraged the governor that he began to siege the fort of Cankoll (Gundugolanu) fort. In this endeavour he used all of his forces and the English factory at Masulipatnam sent Portuguese and English gunners to man his guns and sold gunpowder to the governor. The siege lasted for five months after which the fort surrendered and with which Mubariz Khan began to control the whole Andhra Coast.

While assessing Mubariz Khan's record as governor of Hyderabad, the compiler of the Maasir-ul-Umara, the biographical dictionary of the Mughal nobility, wrote:

He [Mubariz Khan] spent nearly twelve years there [Hyderabad] in punishing the rebellious, and favouring the submissive.... He never ceased to exert himself, and was continually touring from one end of the territory to the other. Although he did not have more than 3,000 horse in his service, yet he drove off large armies of Mahrattas. One of the wretches, wherever he advanced beyond the borders received a severe reverse from the Khan, and every time he wanted to attack this zone, had to run away after being defeated by his strong force.

== Later Days ==
He was an ally of the Barha Sayyids. In the last four years of his life, Mubariz Khan was ever busy with the affairs in Golconda but his eventual end didn't came from the Marathas, Saiyyids but from an able old Turani associate, Nizam-ul-Mulk, Asaf Jah I. As the Khan was on the side of the Saiyyids there was going to be dissensions brewing between them. Although the Khan submitted with 7000 of his horsemen, he was manifestly displeased with the increase in the power of the Nizam.

On 13 February 1722, The Nizam-ul-Mulk, Asaf Jah I was appointed as the Wazir of the Mughal Empire under the King Muhammad Shah. At that time he enquired into the appointments of Mubariz Khan and his sons and he found out significant arrears which were needed to be paid. The Nizam soon however left Delhi and abandoned his post of Wazir as the King was found to be more indulging in personal pleasures rather than managing the affairs of the state . So in pretext of thwarting Maratha Empire Raids in Gujarat Subah and Malwa Subah, he set off towards the Deccan. Muhammad Shah fearing of the Nizam's rising powers released a farman granting the Governorship of the six provinces of the Deccan to Mubariz Khan.

Mubariz Khan was at that time indulging in the siege of fort belonging to Appa Rao at Machilibandar that he was late in his response. In the race for the post, he along with his Afghan followers marched towards Aurangabad but constant delays were made and hence they were forced to camp at Shakar Khera while the Nizam with his entourage already reached Aurangabad. The Nizam also made an alliance with Bajirao I and solicited the help of Maratha soldiers. On 11 October 1724, Mubariz Khan died while fighting against the Nizam at Shakar Khera in the Berar Subah (present day Buldhana district of Maharashtra). He was buried the next day with all of his followers.

== Family ==
Mubariz Khan married the daughter of Inayatullah Kashmiri, and was a brother-in-law of Hidayatullah Khan, the grand vizier of Mughal Empire. With her he had five sons and one daughters.

- Khwaja Ahmad, entitled Shahamat Khan, received the fief of Uthapur and Qawil in Hyderabad.
- Asad Khan, married to the daughter of Mahmud Khan, died in battle.
- Masud Khan, married to the daughter of Khan Zaman Mukarram Khan, died in battle.
- Mahmud Khan, entitled Mubariz Khan after his father's death, received a fief in Amalner, Khandesh.
- Abdul Ma'bud Khan, superintendent of mace-bearers under Muhammad Shah.
- a daughter, married to Thana Ullah Khan, the grandson of Inayatullah Kashmiri.

Mubariz Khan had another son:

- Hamid Ullah Khan, married to a sister of Nizam-ul-Mulk, Asaf Jah I, the Nizam of Hyderabad.

== See also ==
- Mubariz Khan (Bengal)
- Nizam-ul-Mulk, Asaf Jah I
- Farrukhsiyar
- Hyderabad Subah
