= Battle of Ratanpur (1720) =

Battle between the Nizam of Hyderabad and the Marathas

- Part of Decline of the Mughal Empire
Date	19 June 1720
Location	Burhanpur, Madhya Pradesh 23.1376°N 77.4985°E
Result	Nizam's victory

Belligerents
Mughal Empire; Deccan Subah	Mughal Empire; Sayyid Brothers

Commanders and leaders
Nizam-ul-Mulk; Iwaz Khan (WIA); Ghiyas Khan (WIA); Rao Rambha Nimbalkar; Jamal Khan; Quresh Beg (WIA); Badakshi Khan †; Diler Khan †	Dilawar Ali Khan †; Sher Khan †; Babar Khan †; Raja Bhim Singh †; Raja Gaj Singh †; Dosh Muhammad Khan; Sayyid Samsher Khan

Strength
Unknown	8,000 Mughal infantry 3,000 Mughal cavalry 2000–3000 Rajput cavalry 3,500 Afghan cavalry Total: 13000–18000

Casualties and losses
Negligible; 30 killed 100 wounded	5,000 killed
- Battle of Ratanpur 1720 Battle of Ratanpur (1720) (India)

The Battle of Ratanpur or Battle of Pandhar or Battle of Husainpur or Battle of Khandwa in June 1720 A.D. was a significant military engagement between the armies of Nizam ul Mulk and the Imperial Mughal forces led by Sayyid Dilawar Ali Khan. This battle played a crucial role in the creation of the Hyderabad State under Nizam -ul-Mulk and the decline of the influence of the Sayyid brothers in the Deccan region.

== Background ==
On the 19 June 1720, Nizam-ul-Mulk led his army to the battleground. Ghiyas Khan was in charge of the vanguard, supported by Shaikh Muhammad Shah and Nurullah Faruqi, who led the artillery. Iwaz Khan, the governor of Berar, was positioned in the right center with other important officials. Marahmat Khan was on the left center. Aziz Beg Khan Harisi and Abdur-Rahim Khan were on the right and left wings respectively. Mutawassil Khan, Ismail Khan Khweshgi, Kamyab Khan, Darab Khan, Sad-ud-din Khan, and Mir Ahsan were placed in the center. Reayat Khan was left to guard the town of Burhanpur, while Rustam Beg Khan was assigned to protect the rear of the army. Fathullah Khan Khosti and Rao Rambha Nimbalkar, the Mahratta, along with five hundred men, were deployed as skirmishers. The battle took place in the hilly region known as Pandhar between Burhanpur and the Narmada River. Nizam-ul-Mulk marched forty kos from Burhanpur to reach the battlefield. Before engaging the enemy, he advanced four kos from his previous camp, and the battle commenced in the afternoon of the 19 June 1720. Dilawar Ali Khan had positioned himself on a rising ground to the east of the Nawab. He left his baggage at the base of the hill and dispatched his advanced guard, consisting of approximately three thousand horsemen and eight thousand matchlockmen, led by Sayyid Sher Khan and Babar Khan. Dilawar Ali Khan then followed with his main body, surrounded by his key officers on elephants.

== The battle ==
The battle started in the afternoon with the firing of artillery and rockets. Ghiyas Khan and Iwaz Khan moved towards Dilawar Ali Khan from different directions to attack him. However, they could not join forces, leaving Iwaz Khan to face the full force of the Sayyid, Rajput, and Afghan attacks alone. Despite his elephant turning around and many of his men fleeing, Iwaz Khan bravely fought on until he was seriously injured and had to retreat. With cries of victory, Sayyid Sher Khan and Babar Khan, who were riding on elephants, fell down and were killed on the spot. Against two thousand heavily armoured Rajputs, there were only forty men. Bhim Singh and Quresh Beg engaged in a one-on-one battle, after which around forty Rajputs attacked Quresh Beg. Despite the overwhelming odds, Quresh Beg managed to kill Bhim Singh before succumbing to numerous wounds. The bodies of the fallen Rajputs piled up on top of each other. At the same time, Iwaz Khan was in a fierce battle with Sher Khan and Babar Khan. The fighting was intense, lasting for two hours and resembling a scene from doomsday. The Sayyid and his forces fought valiantly, but in the end, he and four thousand five hundred of his men were killed, with only Dost Muhammad Khan Rohela managing to flee. Nizam-ul-Mulk himself did not sustain any injuries, but some of his men, including Khwaja Masum and Mirza Naim, were killed. Sayyid Musafir Khan showed exceptional bravery in defending Ghiyas Khan, with assistance from Yalras Khan. In total, one hundred and twenty-five men from Nizam-ul Mulk's side were either killed or wounded, including some Panni Afghans who defended Iwaz Khan. Around thirty men were killed and approximately one hundred were wounded on Nizam-ul-Mulk's side, while the Sayyid's army suffered a staggering loss of four thousand five hundred soldiers killed, with many more wounded.

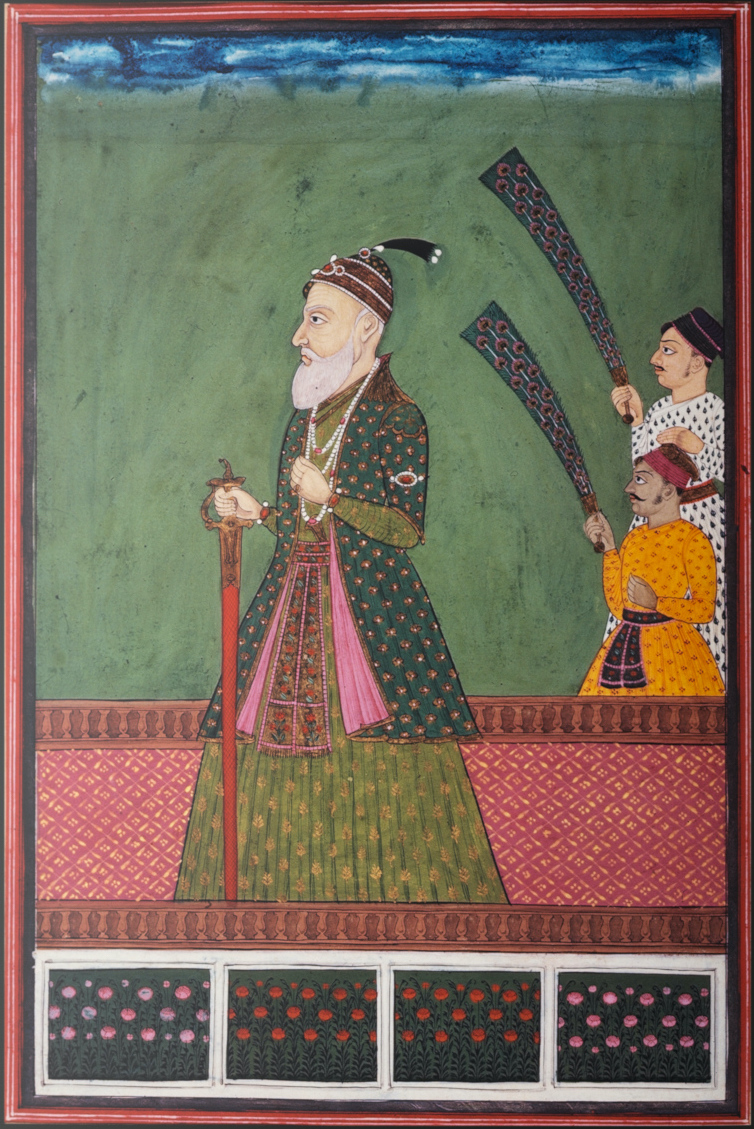
Nizam-ul-Mulk, Asaf Jah I, first Nizam of Hyderabad State

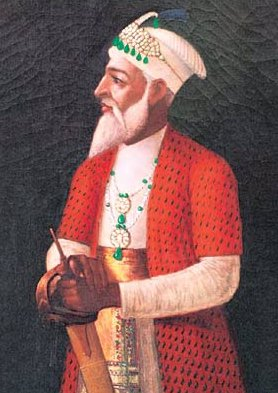
Asaf Jah I, Wazir of Mughal Empire

This was a significant victory for Nizam-ul-Mulk over Dilawar Ali Khan with minimal casualties. Tarikh-i-Muzaffari writes:

Bakht bawar gar bavad
sindan zi dandan bi-shkanad
Tali-i-bargashtah ra
faludah dandan bi-shkanad.
transl. The fates aiding,
you may bite a bit off an anvil.
With the stars against you,
your teeth break over flummery.

Nizam-ul-Mulk celebrated his victory by having drums beaten. There were few casualties on his side, with notable losses including Badakhshi Khan and Diler Khan. Iwaz Khan and Ghiyas Khan were among the wounded. Nizam-ul-Mulk claimed guns and elephants for his own use and the soldiers and looters seized a significant amount of booty. The victorious army camped at the same spot, but the night was disturbed by a loose elephant that caused chaos until Mutawassil Khan shot it down with an arrow.

== Aftermath ==
Nizam-ul-Mulk's officers requested instructions to pursue the enemy, but he declined. Instead, he gathered the wounded near his tent and provided them with medical treatment. Some were given horses, other palanquins, and still other litters for transportation. Upon their recovery, he invited them to join his forces. However, as their leader Husain Ali Khan was still alive, they declined and their travel expenses were covered before they departed. The body of Dilawar Ali Khan was respectfully buried, while the bodies of the Hindus were cremated under the supervision of Rajah Indar Singh. Nizam-ul-Mulk and his soldiers then returned to Burhanpur.

Following these events, two more battles were fought. First the Battle of Balapur followed by the Battle of Hasanpur where Nizam achieved decisive victories against the Imperial forces led by Sayyid commanders. He successfully killed key figures such as Alam Ali, Hussain Ali, and Dilawar Ali, along with their allies, resulting in the weakening of Sayyid authority in the Deccan region. Consequently, this paved the way for the establishment of an independent state known as the Hyderabad State.

== See also ==
- Battle of Balapur
- Battle of Shakar Kheda
