= Battle of Ratanpur =

Battle of Ratanpur may refer to:

- Battle of Ratanpur (1706), conflict between Marathas and Mughal Empire
- Battle of Ratanpur (1720), conflict between Nizam of Hyderabad and Mughal Empire
