= Khwaja Kamal =

First Prime Minister of Nizam of Hyderabad

- خواجہ کمال

The last Subahdar of Berar Subah

Iwaz Khan Azad-u’d Daulah Bahadur Amir-al Umara
- In office ?–1724
- Appointed by: Mir Jumla III
- Monarchs: Aurangzeb; Muhammad Azam Shah; Bahadur Shah I Jahandar Shah; Farrukhsiyar; Rafi ud-Darajat; Shah Jahan II; Muhammad Shah
- Preceded by: Ghazi ud-Din Khan Feroze Jung I
- Constituency: Berar Subah

First Prime Minister of Hyderabad
- In office 1724–1730
- Monarch: Asaf Jah I
- Succeeded by: Anwarullah Khan

Personal details
- Died: 1730 Mughal Empire
- Resting place: Khuldabad, Dargah of Sheikh Burhanuddin

Military service
- Allegiance: Mughal Empire; Nizam of Hyderabad
- Rank: 7,000/7,000 Mansabdar
- Battles/wars: Battle of Balapur; Battle of Shakar Kheda; Nizam's Carnatic campaigns (1725-27)

Khwaja Kamal, commonly known as Iwaz Khan, was a Turani Mughal leader who served as the last Subahdar of the Berar Subah under the Mughal empire. He also held the distinction of being the first Dewan (Prime Minister) of the Nizam of Hyderabad.

He earned the title Iwaz Khan from Emperor Aurangzeb of the Mughal Empire and served as the Faujdar of Berar under the patronage of Mir Jumla III, maintaining this position until 1724. Subsequently, he allied with his nephew Nizamul Mulk, providing crucial support in various conflicts against the Mughal Empire and the Sayyid Brothers, a pivotal role in the establishment of the Asaf Jahi dynasty. Recognizing his contributions, Nizam appointed him as the prime minister of his dominions and elevated his Mansabdar to 7000/7000, granting him the prestigious title of Amir-al Umara of the realm.

== Early life ==
Khwaja Kamal, the grandson of Kilich Khan through his daughter and the nephew of Ghaziuddin Khan Firoz Jang, arrived in India from Turan during Aurangzeb's reign. He was closely associated with Firoz Jang, who subsequently suggested to Aurangzeb to bestow upon him the title of 'Iwaz Khan'. Khwaja served as the trusted aide of Ghaziuddin Khan during his tenure as the Subahdar of Gujarat under Mughal rule.

Following Firoz Jang's passing, Mir Jumla took Khwaja Kamal under his wing and facilitated his appointment as the Faujdar of Berar. Subsequently, Khwaja ascended to the position of Nazim of the Province. He continued in his role during Husain Ali Khan's tenure as Subahdar until Nizamul Mulk rebelled against the Sayyid Brothers, marching from Malwa.

== Military campaigns ==
Iwaz Khan, the maternal uncle of Nizamul Mulk, lent his support to his nephew when he rebelled against the Sayyid Brothers, marching from Malwa to Deccan. Alongside his troops, Iwaz Khan sided with Nizamul Mulk, participating in both the Battle of Balapur and the Battle of Burhanpur, both of which resulted in victories for Nizamul Mulk and his allies against the Sayyid Brothers. Following this, Nizam honoured Iwaz Khan by the title 'Azad-u’d Daulah Bahadur' for his loyalty. Before departing for Delhi in 1722, Nizamul Mulk appointed Iwaz Khan as the Deputy of Deccan.

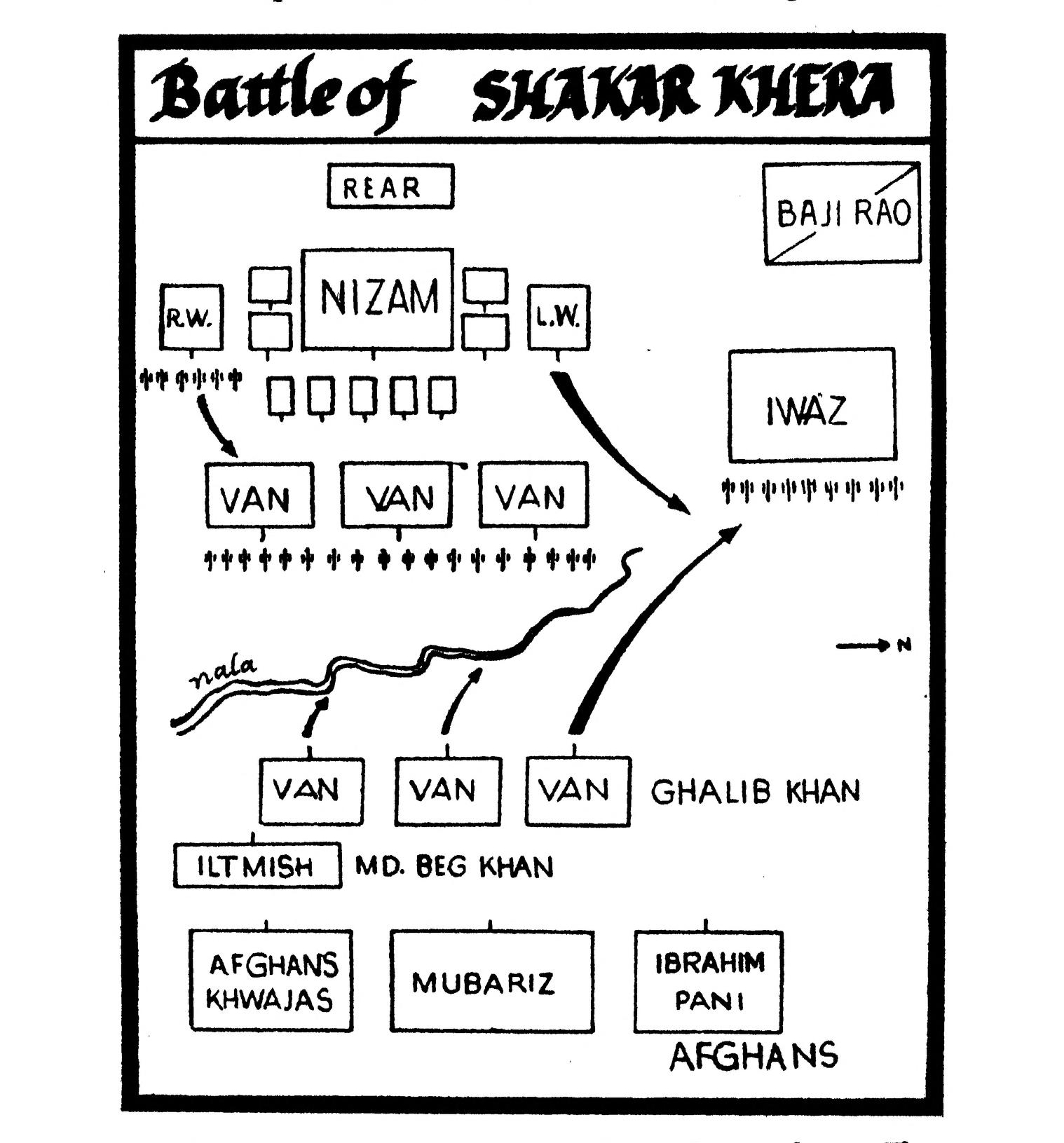
Position of Iwaz Khan in the Battle of Shakar Kheda

During the Battle of Shakar Kheda between the Mughal Empire and the Nizam, Iwaz Khan played a pivotal role in the victory of the Nizam's forces. He repelled a larger contingent of Mughal cavalry, totaling 9,000, which had been ordered by Mubariz Khan. This successful defense contributed significantly to the defeat of the Mughal forces and led to the establishment of the Asaf Jahi dynasty, marking the independence of the Nizam.

In 1724, Aiwaz Khan assumed the position of prime minister of the Nizam. As part of efforts to consolidate power, the Nizam sent an army commanded by Iwaz Khan to the Carnatic region in 1725, with the aim of suppressing Maratha revenue collections. Iwaz Khan led a successful campaign against Maratha tax collectors in the Carnatic region, effectively expelling them from the villages. In the ensuing clashes, the Marathas suffered significant losses and were compelled to withdraw. Expanding his operations, Iwaz Khan advanced into the Maratha-controlled Tanjavur Kingdom and seized Trichinopoly from Serfoji I. This action prompted a response from the Maratha Chhatrapati Shahu, who dispatched larger forces under the leadership of Fateh Singh Bhonsle. Bajirao accompanied him but didn't command.

In August 1727, while Bajirao was pillaging Jalna, the Nizam urgently dispatched Iwaz Khan to take action. Despite Iwaz Khan's attempts to engage in a decisive battle, Bajirao swiftly moved through the countryside without staying at a single place. In response, Iwaz Khan deployed rapid response units to pursue Bajirao, who moved to Mahur and then towards Khandesh. Meanwhile, Nizamu’l-Mulk, foreseeing the threat to Burhanpur posed by Bajirao, outpaced him to intercept his advance. Faced with the pursuit from both armies, Bajirao marched towards Gujarat. The Nizam was ultimately defeated by Bajirao at the Battle of Palkhed in 1728 and was forced to sign the Treaty of Mungi-Shevgaon.

== Ranks and legacy ==
Khwaja Kamal was titled as 'Iwaz Khan' by Emperor Aurangzeb and 'Azad-u’d Daulah Bahadur' by Nizamul Mulk, was granted a Mansabdar of 5000/5000, earning him the title 'Amir-al Kabir' (the Great Amir). In recognition of his contributions, he was promoted to a rank of 7,000 zat and 7,000 horse, which made him 'Amir-al Umara' (Amir of Amirs). Known for his efficient administration and affinity for scholars and Sufis, he died in 1731 and was laid to rest at the Dargah of Sheikh Burhanu’d-Din in Khuldabad.

Upon the passing of 'Iwaz Khan, Nizāmu'l-Mulk expressed,

"Now I feel that I have to perform all the duties of a Sübahdar of Deccan"

— Nizamul Mulk, Asaf Jah, Haqiqatul- Alam,

Iwaz Khan served as his most trusted advisor, and Nizamu'l-Mulk relied heavily on his counsel, never embarking on any campaign or daily administrative task without seeking Iwaz Khan's advice.

== Family ==
Iwaz Khan had five known sons:

- Sayyid Jamal Khan Qaswara Jang- The eldest son. Distinguished himself in battle during the reign of Asaf Jah I, served as deputy and later governor of Berar, briefly supported Nasir Jang during his rebellion against Asaf Jah I before being pardoned and restored to his jagir. He died in 1746 CE, leaving many sons.
- Khwaja Mumin Khan Azad-ud-Daulah- Served as deputy governor of Hyderabad, later governed Burhanpur and Nanded. He eventually retired to his jagir at Patwar Shaikh Babu in Berar and died leaving a large family.
- Khwaja Abdul Hadi Khan- Served for many years as governor of the fort of Mahur. After a brief removal under Salabat Jang, he was restored to office and granted the title Zahir-ud-Daulah Qaswara Jang. He died leaving sons.
- Khwaja Abdur Rashid Khan Bahadur Himmat Jang- Served under Asaf Jah II.
- Khwaja Abdus Shahid Khan Bahadur Haibat Jang- Served under Asaf Jah II.
