= Gollapalem Island =

Island in India

Coordinates: 16.365°N 81.518°E

Chinna Gollapalem Island is a river delta island formed by the Upputeru Rivulet in Andhra Pradesh, India. The island is located in the Kruthivennu mandal of Krishna District. The island faces constant threats from soil erosion due to flooding from the Upputeru River, which is the only outlet of the Kolleru Lake.

Chinna Gollapalem is the most populated village located on the island, with a population of 14,000. There are four other hamlets on the island - Yetimondi, Kotlarevu, Rallarevu and Pallipalem. The island came into prominence due to Muthyala Raju Revu, who topped the UPSC civil services exam in 2006.
