= Mughal successor states =

Regional Indian polities c. 1707–1857

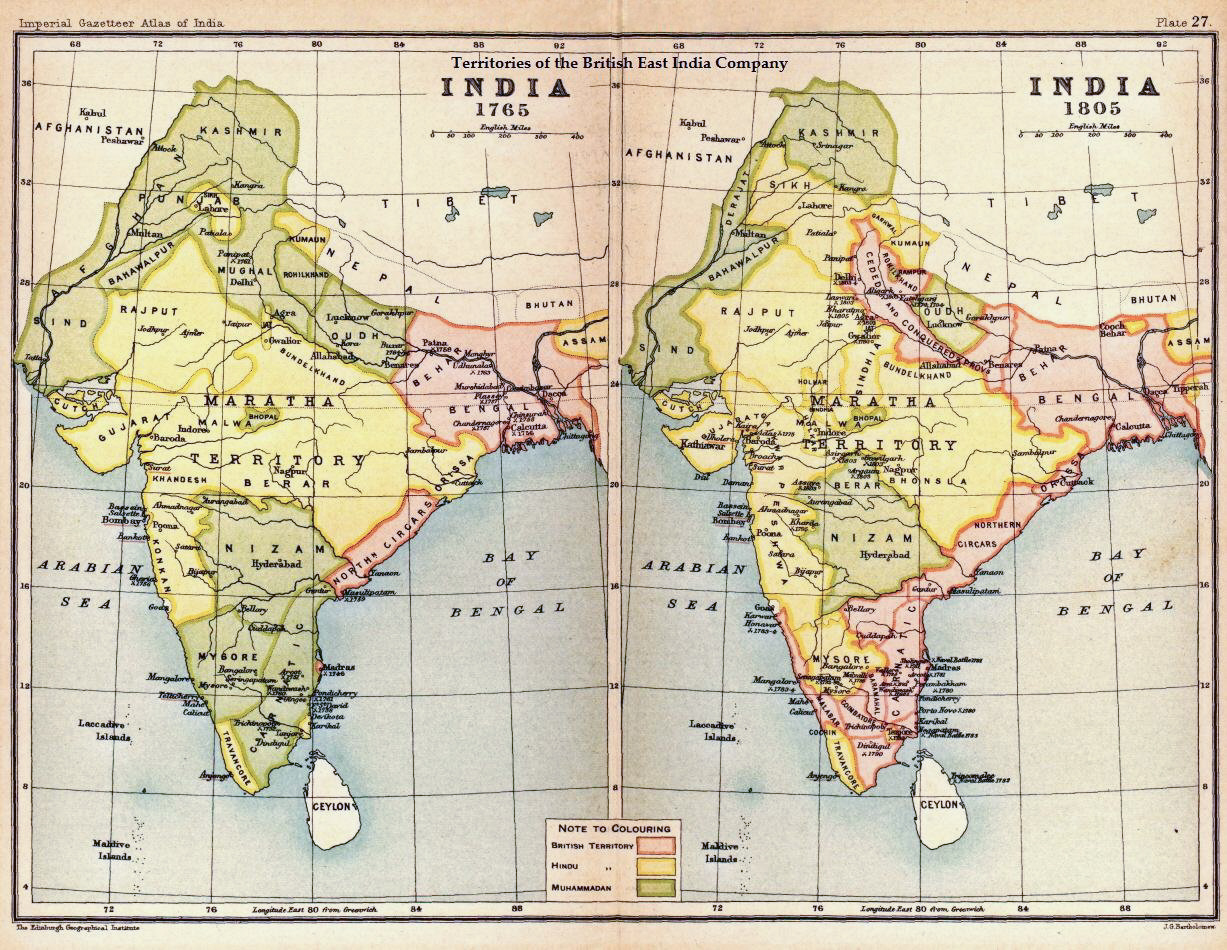
- The Indian subcontinent c. 1765 (left) and 1805 (right), showing the territorial extent of the Mughal successor states and their contraction under British expansion.
- Period: c. 1707 – 1857 (Hyderabad survived as a princely state to 1948)
- Location: Indian subcontinent
- Preceded by: Mughal Empire
- Succeeded by: Company rule in India; British Raj; Durrani Empire
- Core states: Bengal · Awadh · Hyderabad · Arcot · Rohilkhand · Farrukhabad · Bhopal · Rampur · Sind
- Rival and post-Mughal polities: Marathas · Sikhs · Jats of Bharatpur · Durrani Punjab · Mysore · East India Company
- Administrative languages: Persian, Urdu, regional vernaculars
- Inherited institutions: Mansabdari · Jagirdari · Zabt · Dahsala

The Mughal successor states were the regional polities that emerged in the Indian subcontinent during the first half of the 18th century as the administrative and military authority of the Mughal Empire disintegrated after the 1707 death of Aurangzeb. Conventionally dated from Aurangzeb's death to the consolidation of British paramountcy by the middle of the 19th century, the term denotes the semi-autonomous provincial governments that converted their subahs into hereditary holdings while continuing, at least in form, to acknowledge the emperor at Delhi: the Nawabs of Bengal, the Nawabs of Awadh, the Nizams of Hyderabad, and the Nawabs of Arcot. Broader scholarly usage extends the category to contemporaneous polities that rose from Mughal fragmentation without recognising its authority, including the Maratha Empire, the Sikh misls and empire, the Jats of Bharatpur, the Durrani governors of the Punjab, and the Kingdom of Mysore under Haidar Ali and Tipu Sultan.

The states emerged from converging pressures. The crisis of the Mughal jagirdari system, in which the pool of revenue-bearing assignments proved unable to sustain the empire's swelling body of office-holders, eroded the patronage arrangements that had tied provincial governors to the imperial centre. Expansion of the Marathas into northern India diverted Mughal resources, and the Persian invasion of 1739 under Nader Shah, culminating in the sack of Delhi and the seizure of the imperial treasury, broke the prestige of Mughal arms. Provincial governors, responding to these pressures, converted their subahs into hereditary holdings: Murshid Quli Khan in Bengal from 1717, Saadat Ali Khan I in Awadh from 1722, and Nizam-ul-Mulk, Asaf Jah I in the Deccan from 1724. Historians have described this process in terms of both structural decline, associated with the Aligarh school of Irfan Habib, Satish Chandra, and M. Athar Ali, and regional opportunity, elaborated by Muzaffar Alam, C. A. Bayly, and Sanjay Subrahmanyam; most recent treatments accept both framings as complementary.

The core Mughal successor states were Bengal under the Nawabs of Bengal (from Murshid Quli Khan, 1717), Awadh under the Nawabs of Awadh (from Saadat Khan, 1722), Hyderabad under the Nizams (from Asaf Jah I, 1724), and the Carnatic under the Nawabs of Arcot (from 1710). Smaller Nawabi polities, including Rohilkhand under the Rohilla Afghans, Farrukhabad under the Bangash Nawabs, Bhopal under a Yusufzai dynasty, and Rampur formed on the ruins of Rohilkhand after the Rohilla War of 1774, are typically included in the same category. Scholars including Bayly, Alam, and André Wink extend the concept to polities that emerged from the fragmentation of Mughal sovereignty without acknowledging it: the Maratha Confederacy, whose expansion under Baji Rao I and Madhavrao reshaped the Deccan Plateau and northern India; the Sikh misls and, after 1799, the Sikh Empire of Ranjit Singh; the Jats of Bharatpur under Suraj Mal; the Durrani governors installed in the Punjab after the invasions of Ahmad Shah Durrani; and the Kingdom of Mysore under Haidar Ali and his son Tipu Sultan. A minority argument treats the East India Company itself, after its acquisition of the diwani of Bengal in 1765, as the terminal Mughal successor.

The successor states occupy a central place in the "eighteenth-century debate" in South Asian historiography, in which earlier accounts of systemic Mughal decline, articulated by Jadunath Sarkar and developed by the Aligarh school, have been contested by revisionist arguments emphasising regional dynamism, commercial continuity, and the persistence of Mughal administrative forms in provincial settings. Karen Leonard's "Great Firm theory" located the empire's fiscal collapse in the withdrawal of indigenous banking houses from imperial financing, and subsequent work by Dirk Kolff, Sanjay Subrahmanyam, and David Washbrook has situated the successor states within wider changes in the Indian political economy, military labour market, and long-distance trade. The states also provided the political stage for British territorial expansion: East India Company victories at Plassey (1757) and Buxar (1764) brought Bengal under Company control, the Subsidiary Alliance system inaugurated by Lord Wellesley from 1798 absorbed Hyderabad, Awadh, and the Maratha principalities, and direct annexations, including those under the Doctrine of Lapse and the 1856 annexation of Awadh, closed the era for most states. Only Hyderabad, as a princely state, survived to the Indian accession of 1948.

== Background: the Mughal collapse ==
=== Political and fiscal crisis ===
By the final decades of the reign of Aurangzeb (died 1707), the administrative architecture of the Mughal Empire had come under sustained strain from his protracted wars in the Deccan, which kept the imperial army in the field for nearly three decades and drained the treasury while consolidating only limited territorial gains against the Marathas and the Deccan sultanates. Expansion of the ruling nobility (the umarā) outpaced the supply of productive jagirs (revenue assignments supporting military ranks), producing what later historians called the "jagirdari crisis": a structural mismatch between the number of officers entitled to income-bearing assignments and the capacity of existing territories to sustain them, with falling jama (assessed revenue) and rising be-jagiri ("without assignment") waiting-lists pressing against the empire's fiscal base.

Satish Chandra traced the resulting factional conflict within the nobility, as Irani and Turani blocs contested influence at the court of Aurangzeb's successors Bahadur Shah I (1707–1712), Jahandar Shah (1712–1713), and Farrukhsiyar (1713–1719). The execution of Farrukhsiyar by the Sayyid brothers in 1719 and the intrigues surrounding the accession of Muhammad Shah (1719–1748) marked what John F. Richards described as the definitive loss of effective central control, with mansabdars increasingly unable to collect their assignments and imperial orders routinely ignored in the provinces.

=== Nadir Shah's invasion and the 1739 sack of Delhi ===
The fragility of the post-Aurangzeb order was demonstrated dramatically by the invasion of 1738–1739 led by the Afsharid ruler of Iran, Nader Shah. After sacking Kabul and Lahore, the Persian army annihilated the Mughal force at the Battle of Karnal on 24 February 1739, capturing Emperor Muhammad Shah and proceeding to occupy Delhi. A riot in the city prompted a three-day massacre in which contemporary estimates placed the dead in the tens of thousands, and the ensuing sack saw the Persian army carry away the imperial treasury, including the Peacock Throne and the Koh-i-Noor diamond, along with indemnities calculated by Sarkar at some seventy crore rupees. Muzaffar Alam has argued that the invasion did not cause the empire's fragmentation so much as expose a collapse already well advanced, but its demonstrative effect was decisive: the inability of the imperial army to defend the capital ended any plausible claim that the Mughal state retained a monopoly of legitimate force across its former territories.

Further incursions by Ahmad Shah Durrani between 1748 and 1761, culminating in the Third Battle of Panipat in January 1761 at which the Durrani army shattered the Maratha forces that had by then assumed much of the imperial role in north India, reinforced the pattern of successive external blows against an enfeebled centre.

=== Regional autonomy under nominal sovereignty ===
Amid these pressures, provincial governors and administrators converted their offices into hereditary positions while continuing to render formal obeisance to the Mughal emperor. Murshid Quli Khan, diwan of Bengal, consolidated control over its revenues from 1700 and was functionally independent by 1717, when Farrukhsiyar formally conferred on him the subahdari of Bengal; his son-in-law Shuja-ud-Din Muhammad Khan and subsequent successors transmitted the office within the family. In Awadh, Saadat Khan, appointed subahdar in 1722, and his successors Safdar Jang and Shuja-ud-Daula passed the office within the family while retaining Mughal titles and continuing to remit tribute. Nizam-ul-Mulk, Asaf Jah I, a senior Mughal noble who had served as wazir in the 1720s, abandoned the imperial court in 1724 after defeating his rival Mubariz Khan at the Battle of Shakar Kheda and established an independent power in the Deccan that continued as the state of Hyderabad until 1948.

In each case, the formal assertion of continued loyalty to the Mughal emperor, reflected in coinage, the reading of the khutba in the emperor's name, and the continued use of Mughal titles, coexisted with the de facto transfer of revenue collection, appointment of officers, and military decision-making to the provincial capital.

== Emergence and characteristics ==
=== Nominal acknowledgment of the emperor ===
The successor states almost uniformly continued to acknowledge the Mughal emperor as a source of legitimation even as the substance of power passed to provincial rulers. Coinage was struck in the emperor's name; the khutba in Friday congregational prayers invoked him; diplomatic correspondence was framed in the idiom of Mughal service; and formal farmans of investiture, however perfunctory, continued to be issued from Delhi. As C. A. Bayly observed, this persistence of the Mughal frame of reference reflected the emperor's residual symbolic utility: provincial rulers competed for mansab ranks and imperial honours that strengthened their standing among local élites, and the Mughal court, even after 1739, retained enough prestige to confer rather than merely record legitimacy. The fiction was exposed only occasionally, as when Clive returned the diwani of Bengal to the emperor Shah Alam II in the 1765 Treaty of Allahabad and then collected it through Company hands, an act that marked the emperor's final conversion into a nominal sovereign whose writ ran only in and around Delhi.

=== Continuity of Mughal institutions ===
Successor states inherited and adapted the administrative apparatus of the empire. The mansabdari hierarchy, the chief Mughal device for grading military-administrative officers, continued in modified form at most provincial courts, with the largest successor states issuing their own ranks and titles. The jagir system of revenue assignment persisted, although the balance between ba-jagir (assigned) and khalisa (directly administered) lands shifted in favour of the latter as rulers sought more reliable income streams. The zabt method of revenue assessment, part of the Mughal fiscal system, formalised under Akbar and his finance minister Raja Todar Mal, remained the default framework in the Gangetic provinces, though the dahsala ten-year averaged-yield calculations were replaced in many regions by annual negotiation between revenue-farmers and the state.

In Bengal, Murshid Quli Khan undertook a substantial overhaul of the revenue system beginning in 1717, replacing many smaller Hindu zamindars with larger, more consolidated holdings whose revenue obligations were backed by the credit of the Jagat Seth banking house; Peter J. Marshall has argued that this reorganisation produced one of the most stable revenue administrations in eighteenth-century India, generating surpluses that subsequently underwrote British Bengal's expansion. In Hyderabad, Nizam-ul-Mulk preserved intact the Mughal pattern of parganas and sarkars while superimposing a more personal structure of jagirs granted to his immediate followers.

=== New revenue arrangements ===
Alongside these continuities, the successor states developed distinctive revenue arrangements that departed from Mughal precedent. Revenue-farming (ijara), marginal in the Akbari revenue theory but increasingly important under Aurangzeb, became the standard practice across most successor states, with short-term contracts sold at auction to the highest bidder. The amils (revenue collectors) and chaudhuris of the Mughal countryside were joined or replaced by a new class of revenue entrepreneurs drawn from Hindu service communities, Khatri, Kayastha, Jain, and Marwari merchant families, whose credit and local networks underpinned the cash-settlement systems of the successor states.

This shift produced what Bayly and Subrahmanyam later called "portfolio capitalists": merchant-administrators operating across revenue, commerce, and finance who tied the successor states into the commercial expansion of the 18th century and provided the infrastructure through which European trading companies would eventually extend their influence.

== Core successor states ==
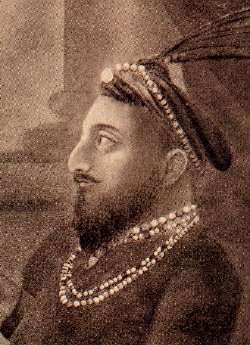
Murshid Quli Khan (Bengal)

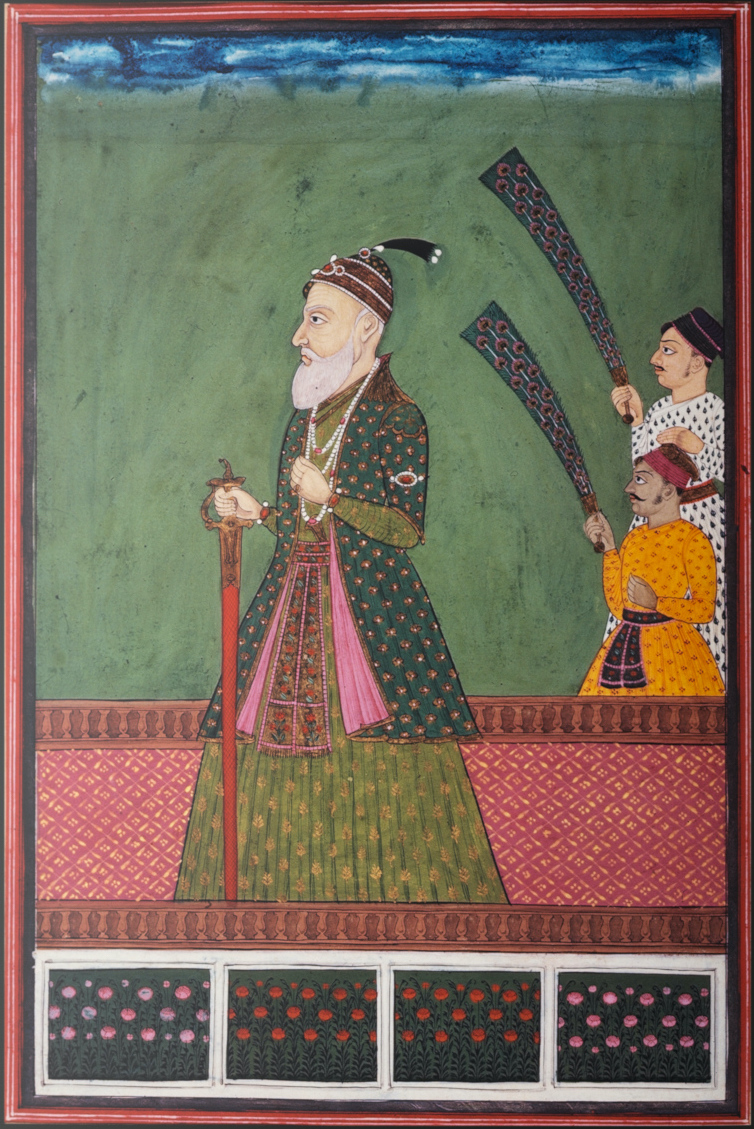
Asaf Jah I (Hyderabad)

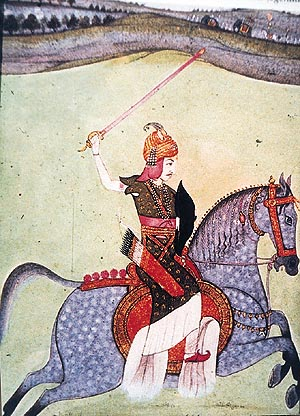
Baji Rao I (Maratha Peshwa)

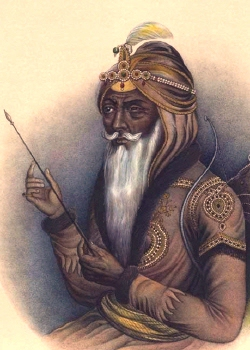
Ranjit Singh (Sikh Empire)

=== Bengal ===
The Bengal successor state was established by Murshid Quli Khan, an Iranian Shia diwan appointed by Aurangzeb in 1700 to reform the province's revenue administration, who assumed the subahdari alongside it from 1717. Murshid Quli transferred the provincial capital from Dhaka to Murshidabad, which he founded and named after himself, and consolidated revenue collection by replacing smaller zamindars with larger, more consolidated holdings whose obligations were underwritten by the Jagat Seth banking house. The state passed after his death in 1727 to his son-in-law Shuja-ud-Din Muhammad Khan (r. 1727–1739), and then by armed seizure to Alivardi Khan (r. 1740–1756), a former official who had risen in Bihar.

Alivardi's reign was dominated by Maratha raids launched from Nagpur under Raghuji I Bhonsle from 1741 to 1751, which devastated western Bengal and ultimately forced the cession of Orissa and the payment of annual chauth to the Marathas. Despite these losses, Bengal remained the wealthiest of the successor states: Peter J. Marshall estimated its annual revenue at the mid-century at roughly three crores of rupees, far in excess of any other Indian province.

Alivardi's grandson and successor Siraj ud-Daulah (r. 1756–1757) attempted to reassert the state's authority over the fortified English East India Company settlement at Calcutta, seizing the town in June 1756 in an episode that included the controversial Black Hole of Calcutta. The Company retook Calcutta under Robert Clive in January 1757; at the Battle of Plassey on 23 June 1757, Clive's forces, in collusion with a conspiracy of Bengal officers and merchants led by Mir Jafar and the Jagat Seths, defeated Siraj-ud-Daulah, whose army stood largely aside in the decisive engagement. Mir Jafar was installed as nawab but deposed in 1760 in favour of Mir Qasim; Mir Qasim's attempt to reduce Company interference in Bengal's internal trade led to renewed war and, at the Battle of Buxar on 22 October 1764, the defeat of a combined Mughal–Awadh–Bengal force by Company troops under Hector Munro.

On 12 August 1765, under the terms of the Treaty of Allahabad, Emperor Shah Alam II granted the company the diwani of Bengal, Bihar, and Orissa (the right to collect revenue) while the nizamat (judicial and military functions) remained nominally with a Mughal-appointed nawab. This "dual government" left Bengal as the earliest Mughal successor state absorbed in practice into European rule; formal transfer of the nizamat followed in 1772, and the nawabi was reduced to a pensioned dignity.

=== Awadh ===
Awadh under its Nawabs was the most durable of the core north Indian successor states, surviving as a nominally sovereign polity until 1856 and providing the dynastic model that Muzaffar Alam placed at the centre of his revisionist account of the eighteenth century. Saadat Khan Burhan-ul-Mulk, a Nishapuri Iranian noble, was appointed subahdar of Awadh in 1722 and consolidated his authority over the region's zamindars during the 1720s through a combination of campaigning against recalcitrant taluqdars and rapprochement with pliable Hindu service communities, particularly Kayastha revenue officers and Bhumihar landholders.

Saadat Khan's successor Safdar Jang (r. 1739–1754) combined the Awadh subahdari with the Mughal wazirship between 1748 and 1753, briefly concentrating imperial and provincial authority in one hand before factional conflict at Delhi forced his withdrawal to Faizabad. Under Shuja-ud-Daula (r. 1754–1775), Awadh reached its territorial extent, absorbing the Rohilkhand territories after the First Rohilla War of 1774 with British assistance. Shuja's alliance with the fugitive emperor Shah Alam II and the deposed Bengal nawab Mir Qasim had earlier led him to the disastrous Battle of Buxar in 1764; by the terms of the Treaty of Allahabad, Awadh retained its territory but accepted Company military support and financial obligations that Richard Barnett described as the first version of a subsidiary arrangement.

Shuja's son Asaf-ud-Daula (r. 1775–1797) moved the capital from Faizabad to Lucknow in 1775, where the court sponsored a distinctive Lucknowi literary and architectural florescence centred on the Bara Imambara and associated complexes. Under his successors Wazir Ali and Saadat Ali Khan II, Awadh accepted a formal subsidiary alliance with the Company in 1801, ceding the western half of the kingdom (Rohilkhand and the Lower Doab) in lieu of subsidy payments for a Company-officered sepoy force. The residual kingdom was annexed outright in February 1856 by the Company under Governor-General Dalhousie, on grounds of misgovernment, and its last nawab Wajid Ali Shah deposed to Calcutta; the annexation was a proximate trigger of the Indian Rebellion of 1857.

=== Hyderabad ===
Hyderabad was established by Nizam-ul-Mulk, Asaf Jah I (Mir Qamaruddin Khan), a senior Turani noble who had served as Mughal wazir in 1722 before abandoning Delhi in 1724 to return to the Deccan, where he had previously served as subahdar. After defeating his rival Mubariz Khan at the Battle of Shakar Kheda in October 1724 and eluding an imperial attempt to recall him, Asaf Jah consolidated a domain that at its maximum extent stretched from the Narmada to the Tungabhadra and included most of what is now the Telugu-speaking country and parts of Karnataka and Maharashtra. The state remained nominally subordinate to the Mughal emperor throughout the 18th century, receiving its farmans of investiture and striking coin in the emperor's name into the 1850s, a pattern that Karen Leonard used as one of her central examples of the persistence of Mughal symbolic forms under radically altered political conditions.

After Asaf Jah's death in 1748 the state entered a prolonged succession crisis, during which French and later British support played a decisive role in determining the succession. Nizam Ali Khan, Asaf Jah II (r. 1762–1803) stabilised the state and, under pressure from expanding Maratha power and the emergent Mysore of Haidar Ali and Tipu Sultan, accepted a formal subsidiary alliance with the East India Company in 1798 during Wellesley's governor-generalship. In exchange for Company-officered sepoy regiments stationed at Hyderabad, the Nizam ceded the Rayalaseema districts in 1800 and agreed to conduct foreign relations only through the company.

Hyderabad's accommodation with the Company preserved it from outright annexation. Under Asaf Jah III and his successors, the state survived the upheavals of 1857 on the British side, and continued as the largest princely state of the British Raj, an arrangement whose social history Leonard reconstructed through the careers of the Hyderabadi Kayastha administrative service. Hyderabad's formal independence ended only with the Indian military action of September 1948 and its integration into the Dominion of India.

=== Arcot (Carnatic) ===
The Carnatic under the Nawabs of Arcot originated as a sub-subahdari under Hyderabad, created in 1710 when Saadatullah Khan I was installed at Arcot to administer the Mughal Deccan's southeastern districts. The Nawabs became effectively independent from Hyderabad during the Deccan succession disputes of the 1740s, in which they played a central role as European-backed contestants. The Carnatic Wars of 1746–1763 between the French and British East India Companies were in large measure a contest over the Arcot succession, with the British candidate Muhammad Ali Khan Wallajah emerging successful after the Siege of Arcot of 1751 (defended by Robert Clive) and his final defeat of the French-backed claimant in the Third Carnatic War.

Muhammad Ali Wallajah (r. 1749–1795) accumulated very large debts to Company merchants and private creditors to finance these wars, and the resulting "Nabobs of Arcot" scandal became a recurrent subject of parliamentary controversy in London during the 1770s and 1780s. The Nawab's financial dependence on the Company progressively transferred effective administration of the Carnatic to the Madras Council. The Carnatic Sultanate was annexed outright in 1801 under the treaty arrangements following the death of its last effective nawab Umdat ul-Umara and the Fourth Anglo-Mysore War that had established Company supremacy in the south.

Core Mughal successor states
State	Founding ruler	Year of effective independence	Capital	Final absorption
Bengal	Murshid Quli Khan	1717	Murshidabad	Diwani to Company 1765; nizamat 1772
Awadh	Saadat Khan	1722	Faizabad, Lucknow (from 1775)	Subsidiary alliance 1801; annexed 1856
Hyderabad	Asaf Jah I	1724	Aurangabad, Hyderabad (from 1763)	Subsidiary alliance 1798; princely state to 1948
Arcot	Saadatullah Khan I	1710	Arcot	Annexed 1801
Rohilkhand	Ali Mohammed Khan	c. 1720	Aonla, Bareilly	Annexed by Awadh 1774
Farrukhabad	Muhammad Khan Bangash	1713	Farrukhabad	Subsidiary alliance 1801; princely state
Bhopal	Dost Mohammad Khan	c. 1723	Bhopal	Subsidiary alliance 1818; princely state to 1949
Sind	Noor Mohammad Kalhoro	1737	Khudabad, Hyderabad (from 1768)	Subsidiary alliance 1809; annexed 1843
Rampur	Faizullah Khan	1774	Rampur	Subsidiary alliance 1794; princely state to 1949

=== Secondary core: Rohilkhand, Farrukhabad, Bhopal, Rampur ===
Alongside the four major Nawabi states, several smaller Mughal successor polities emerged in northern and central India during the mid-18th century. Rohilkhand, in the doab between the Ganges and the foothills, was formed by Afghan (Rohilla) military entrepreneurs who entered imperial service from the late 17th century, under leaders including Ali Mohammed Khan and Hafiz Rahmat Khan. The state's effective independence was ended by the First Rohilla War of 1774, in which Awadh with Company military assistance annexed most of Rohilkhand; a remnant continued as the Rampur State under Faizullah Khan from 1774.

Farrukhabad, in the upper Doab, was founded in 1713 by Muhammad Khan Bangash, an Afghan mansabdar of Bangash origin; the Bangash Nawabs maintained a compact territory through the 18th century and accepted Company suzerainty in 1801. Bhopal, in central India, was established by the Afghan soldier-of-fortune Dost Mohammad Khan around 1723 on a small territory carved from the decaying administration of Malwa, and, like Hyderabad, survived as a princely state through the colonial period. Rampur, as noted, emerged from the truncation of Rohilkhand in 1774 and remained a Rohilla-ruled princely state under British paramountcy until 1949.

== Rival and post-Mughal polities ==
=== Maratha Confederacy ===
The Maratha Confederacy was not a Mughal successor state in the formal sense of inheriting a subahdari, but it occupies a central place in almost all accounts of the 18th-century political landscape. Founded by Shivaji in the 1670s as a regional kingdom in the western Deccan, the Maratha state was reorganised after 1714 under a succession of Peshwas (Brahmin hereditary chief ministers) into a loose confederation whose constituent houses, chief among them the Bhonsle of Nagpur, the Holkar of Indore, the Scindia of Gwalior, and the Gaekwad of Baroda, expanded Maratha influence across western and northern India during the first half of the century. The Marathas collected chauth (one quarter of revenue) and sardeshmukhi (an additional tenth) from a band of territories extending from Orissa in the east to Gujarat in the west and Delhi in the north; André Wink described this as a system of tributary overlordship operating alongside rather than replacing the Mughal framework.

Maratha expansion reached its high-water mark under Madhavrao I (r. 1761–1772), who recovered from the catastrophic defeat at the Third Battle of Panipat of 14 January 1761, at which Ahmad Shah Durrani's forces annihilated the Maratha army under Sadashivrao Bhau. The subsequent defeats in the three Anglo-Maratha wars between 1775 and 1818 ended with Company absorption of the Peshwa's territories in 1818 and the reduction of the surviving Maratha houses to subsidiary allies.

=== Sikh Misls and the Sikh Empire ===
In the Punjab, the Sikh community, mobilised militarily against Mughal persecution from the late 17th century under the later gurus and their successor Banda Singh Bahadur, consolidated from the 1720s into a confederation of twelve misls (independent warrior-bands) that controlled the country between the Sutlej and the Indus. Between 1799 and 1801 the misl leader Ranjit Singh of the Sukerchakia Misl unified most of the Punjabi misls under his own authority, founding the Sikh Empire with Lahore as its capital.

Ranjit Singh's state combined a large modern army (the Khalsa Army, trained by European officers including Jean-François Allard and Paolo Avitabile) with the continued use of Persian as an administrative language and the retention of many Mughal revenue and administrative forms. After Ranjit Singh's death in 1839 the Sikh state fractured into factional war, and was defeated and annexed by the Company in the First (1845–1846) and Second Anglo-Sikh Wars (1848–1849).

=== Jats of Bharatpur ===
The Jat chieftainship of Bharatpur was consolidated in the 1720s by Churaman and Badan Singh, and reached its height under Suraj Mal (r. 1755–1763), who exploited the disintegrating Mughal authority to occupy Agra in 1761 and briefly to hold Delhi. Bharatpur accepted Company subsidiary alliance terms in 1803, retained its ruling house through the colonial period, and acceded to the Dominion of India in 1948.

=== Durrani Punjab ===
Between 1752 and 1765 the Durrani Empire of Ahmad Shah Durrani claimed and intermittently administered the Punjab through appointed governors, incorporating the province into an Afghan-centred polity that stretched from Khorasan to the Ganges-Jamuna Doab. Durrani sovereignty in the Punjab was progressively displaced during the 1760s by Sikh misl expansion; by 1799 the Durrani position had been extinguished east of the Jhelum, and Ranjit Singh's Sikh Empire absorbed the former Durrani districts over the following two decades.

=== Mysore under Haidar Ali and Tipu Sultan ===
The Kingdom of Mysore, under the Wadiyar dynasty since the 16th century, was effectively taken over after 1761 by the military entrepreneur Haidar Ali, and from 1782 by his son Tipu Sultan. Under Haidar and Tipu, Mysore built a disciplined infantry army along European lines, developed an extensive state-controlled commerce and sericulture, and fought the four Anglo-Mysore Wars (1767–1769, 1780–1784, 1790–1792, 1799).

Tipu, who corresponded with Revolutionary France and styled himself Padishah, was killed defending Srirangapatna in the Fourth Anglo-Mysore War on 4 May 1799. The Wadiyar dynasty was restored as a Company subsidiary ally on reduced territory; the former Mysorean ports and the Kanara coast were absorbed directly into Company India.

=== Company rule and the Bengal Presidency ===
A minority scholarly position, most closely associated with P. J. Marshall, treats the East India Company itself as the terminal Mughal successor after its acquisition of the diwani of Bengal in 1765. On this reading, the Company inherited, modified, and ultimately replaced the Mughal administrative apparatus in Bengal rather than overturning it in any single stroke, collecting revenue in the emperor's name until 1835 and retaining the nawabi of Bengal as a pensioned fiction. The argument is reinforced by the persistence of Mughal administrative language, record-keeping, and personnel in the Bengal Presidency through the first half of the 19th century, and by the central place occupied by the Mughal emperor's formal legitimation in Company diplomacy until the abolition of the diwani fiction in 1835.

== Historiography ==
=== The eighteenth-century decline debate ===
Until the 1970s, accounts of the Mughal successor states were dominated by a narrative of systemic decline whose classic formulation was Jadunath Sarkar's four-volume Fall of the Mughal Empire (1932–1950). For Sarkar and his contemporaries, the 18th century represented a "dark age" of political fragmentation, economic contraction, and cultural stagnation, from which the subcontinent was rescued only by the establishment of British rule. Subsequent work in the Aligarh tradition, notably M. Athar Ali's The Mughal Nobility under Aurangzeb (1966), Satish Chandra's Parties and Politics at the Mughal Court (1959), and Irfan Habib's The Agrarian System of Mughal India (1963), refined this decline narrative by locating its origin in structural contradictions: specifically, an over-extraction of agricultural surplus (the agrarian crisis) and a jagirdari crisis produced by the mismatch between a growing nobility and a fixed revenue base.

From the late 1970s, a revisionist historiography, drawing on regional archives and anthropological methods, contested this narrative. Muzaffar Alam's The Crisis of Empire in Mughal North India (1986), focused on Awadh and the Punjab, treated the 18th century as a period of "crisis and opportunity" in which the disruption of central authority enabled the consolidation of stable, commercially dynamic regional states. C. A. Bayly's Rulers, Townsmen and Bazaars (1983) and Indian Society and the Making of the British Empire (1988) extended this argument across northern India, emphasising the continuity of commercial networks and the emergence of a stable "portfolio capitalist" mercantile elite that spanned the transition from Mughal to Company rule. The revisionist case was further developed by regional specialists including P. J. Marshall (Bengal), Richard Barnett (Awadh), Karen Leonard (Hyderabad), and Kumkum Chatterjee (Bihar).

=== Historiography of the successor states ===
The revisionist historiography of the successor states has advanced through several complementary theses.

The eighteenth century was not the dark age of earlier historiography but a period of intense regional experimentation in state-building and commerce, within a framework that remained, formally and often substantively, Mughal.

— C. A. Bayly, Indian Society and the Making of the British Empire (1988)

Karen Leonard's "Great Firm theory", first stated in her 1979 article in Comparative Studies in Society and History, located the fiscal collapse of the Mughal state in the progressive withdrawal of indigenous banking houses, chief among them the Jagat Seth firm of Bengal and the bankers of Mathura and Bikaner, from imperial financing over the late 17th and early 18th centuries. (Note: The Leonard 1979 article is paywalled on Cambridge Core; the argument is developed at book length in Leonard's Social History of an Indian Caste: The Kayasths of Hyderabad (1978), available in open access on the Internet Archive.) On Leonard's account, the re-allocation of banking credit toward successor-state administrations and, eventually, toward the East India Company, preceded and enabled the political fragmentation conventionally taken as the explanation. The argument drew criticism from Aligarh historians for displacing the primary cause of decline from the agrarian to the financial sector, but has been substantially adopted by subsequent scholarship on 18th-century Indian political economy.

Dirk Kolff's Naukar, Rajput and Sepoy (1990) provided a complementary reframing of the military history of the period. Kolff argued that 18th-century north India was characterised by an active military labour market in which Rajput and other peasant-soldier populations moved between employment under Mughal, successor-state, Maratha, and eventually British armies; the successor states, on this reading, competed for a common pool of military talent that was progressively monopolised by the company's better-capitalised sepoy battalions. André Wink's Land and Sovereignty in India (1986) developed a parallel argument for the Maratha state, framing sarkar relations in terms of fitna (a layered and contestable concept of sovereignty) rather than fixed territorial rule, and situating the Marathas within a wider "politics of succession" that the Mughal framework had long accommodated.

Recent scholarship has moved beyond the decline-versus-dynamism opposition. Sanjay Subrahmanyam's connected-history work, with Bayly in "Portfolio Capitalists and the Political Economy of Early Modern India" (1988) and separately, has reframed the successor states within Eurasian-scale circuits of trade, fiscal innovation, and state-building. (Note: The Subrahmanyam and Bayly article is paywalled on SAGE; its central argument is developed at greater length in Bayly's Rulers, Townsmen and Bazaars (1983), chapters 2–4.) David Washbrook's work on south India has questioned whether regional dynamism amounted to "progress" in any substantial economic sense, arguing for more attention to social differentiation and agrarian distress within the successor-state framework. (Note: The Washbrook article is paywalled on Cambridge Core.) Metcalf and other imperial-ideology historians have analysed how the company's own self-presentation as the Mughal successor shaped the racial and political categories of the 19th-century Raj.

== Political economy and governance patterns ==
=== Administrative continuity ===
The most consistent feature of the successor states across regions was the preservation, with local adaptation, of the Mughal administrative grid. The subah–sarkar–pargana structure of territorial subdivision, the mansab system of military-administrative ranking (in modified form), the jagir system of revenue assignment, and the zabt method of revenue assessment remained in continuous use. Record-keeping conventions, including the use of Persian as the administrative language, survived unbroken into the 19th century, only gradually displaced after the 1835 replacement of Persian by English and the vernaculars as the official languages of the British Raj.

The successor states also shared a pattern of administrative recruitment. The senior revenue and financial officers of Bengal, Awadh, and Hyderabad were drawn disproportionately from Iranian and Turani nobility in the first generation and increasingly, by the mid-18th century, from Kayastha, Khatri, Brahmin, and Bhumihar service communities whose skills in Persian record-keeping and local revenue knowledge were essential to the working of the provincial state.

=== Fiscal fragmentation and the Great Firm ===
The financial infrastructure that underpinned the successor states rested on a network of indigenous banking houses whose role Leonard placed at the centre of her analysis. The Jagat Seth firm in Bengal, the Oswal and Marwari banking families in Rajasthan, and the shroffs of Gujarat and the Deccan provided the credit that enabled revenue-farming, hundi (bill of exchange) remittances between provinces, and the financing of military campaigns. The successor-state fiscal architecture was therefore not a diminished version of Mughal centralisation but a different pattern: more monetised, more dependent on private banking, and more exposed to credit conditions in the major commercial centres.

The Great Firm thesis argued that the progressive migration of banking credit away from the Mughal centre, first toward Murshidabad and the Deccan successor-state administrations and then, after 1750, toward the East India Company's Fort William establishment in Bengal, both signalled and accelerated the political transition. Banking houses moved credit to where they expected stable repayment; their judgments about relative risk ratified and entrenched the redistribution of political power.

=== Military labour and the shift to sepoy armies ===
The 18th century saw an expansion and reorganisation of India's military labour market, a transformation Kolff documented through court records, army pay registers, and chronicles of Rajput and Afghan recruitment. Successor-state armies drew on a large pool of mobile peasant soldiers whose employment shifted between Mughal, regional, and eventually Company employers. The sepoy battalions developed by the French and British East India Companies from the 1740s were not a radical departure but a further evolution of Indian military practice, adopting European drill, artillery, and uniform pay while recruiting from the same labour pool as the Marathas, Awadh, and Hyderabad.

The company's advantage was partly fiscal, partly organisational. Better access to Bengali revenue after 1757 funded regular pay and standardised equipment at a scale that successor states could match only during periods of peak prosperity; and Company officers combined the new drill with ruthlessly applied contract enforcement, reducing the traditional Indian soldier's ability to negotiate terms and change employer. By the end of the 18th century, the absorption of successor-state militaries into the company's subsidiary alliance system had converted most of the subcontinent's military manpower into Company-officered sepoys, an outcome that Kolff read as the decisive structural change of the period.

== British intervention and absorption ==
British territorial expansion across the 18th and early 19th centuries proceeded state by state and treaty by treaty, rather than as a single conquest. East India Company acquisition of Bengal through Plassey (1757), Buxar (1764), and the Treaty of Allahabad (1765) provided the revenue base for all subsequent expansion; the Carnatic Wars of 1746–1763 established Company dominance in the south at the expense of both the French and the Nawab of Arcot.

Under Governor-General Warren Hastings (1773–1785) and later Lord Wellesley (1798–1805), the Company moved from commercial and revenue-based interaction to formal treaty relations with the remaining successor states. The Subsidiary Alliance system, inaugurated by Wellesley in 1798, conditioned peace with a successor state on that state's maintenance, at its own expense, of Company-officered sepoy forces stationed on its territory, and on the conduct of foreign relations only through the Company Resident. Hyderabad accepted the first subsidiary alliance in 1798, Awadh in 1801, the Peshwa in 1802, and Bharatpur and other smaller states by 1803.

Formal annexations followed along three overlapping lines. First, territorial cessions in lieu of subsidy payments: Awadh ceded the Lower Doab and Rohilkhand in 1801, the Nizam ceded Rayalaseema in 1800, Mysore's coastal districts were taken after the Fourth Anglo-Mysore War of 1799. Second, direct military absorption: the three Anglo-Maratha Wars ended Maratha independence in 1818, and the First (1845–1846) and Second (1848–1849) Anglo-Sikh Wars extinguished the Sikh Empire. Third, annexations on doctrinal grounds: the Doctrine of Lapse applied from 1848 by Governor-General Dalhousie annexed Satara (1848), Jaitpur, Sambalpur, Jhansi (1853), and Nagpur (1854) on the grounds that their rulers had died without natural heirs; the annexation of Awadh in February 1856 proceeded on the separate ground of alleged misgovernment, and, together with the other Dalhousie annexations, became a proximate trigger of the Indian Rebellion of 1857.

The suppression of the Rebellion and the formal replacement of the company by the Crown in 1858 brought the era of the Mughal successor states to a legal close. The Mughal emperor Bahadur Shah Zafar was deposed and exiled; the remaining successor states were partly annexed and partly reconstituted as princely states under direct British paramountcy.

Subsidiary alliances and annexations of the successor states
State	Subsidiary alliance	Territorial cession	Final absorption	Instrument
Bengal	n/a	n/a	1772	Diwani 1765, nizamat 1772
Hyderabad	1798	1800 (Rayalaseema)	survived to 1948	Princely-state status
Awadh	1801	1801 (Lower Doab)	1856	Annexation (misgovernment)
Arcot (Carnatic)	n/a	n/a	1801	Annexation
Peshwa (Maratha)	1802 (Treaty of Bassein)	1803, 1818	1818	Third Anglo-Maratha War
Mysore (Wadiyar restoration)	1799	1799 (Kanara)	Restored 1881	Princely-state status
Sikh Empire	n/a	1846	1849	Second Anglo-Sikh War
Satara	n/a	1848	1848	Doctrine of Lapse
Jhansi	n/a	1853	1853	Doctrine of Lapse
Nagpur	n/a	1854	1854	Doctrine of Lapse

== Legacy ==
The surviving successor states, including Hyderabad, Rampur, Bhopal, and the post-1818 Maratha houses (Indore, Gwalior, Baroda), continued as princely states under the British Raj. At Indian independence in 1947 they acceded to either the Dominion of India or the Dominion of Pakistan in a process completed by 1948, the last holdout being Hyderabad, which was integrated into India by military action in September 1948.

The successor-state period left an enduring imprint on South Asian culture and institutions. The Lucknowi and Murshidabadi literary, musical, and architectural schools of the 18th and early 19th centuries, and the parallel developments at Hyderabad, Farrukhabad, Rampur, and Bhopal, elaborated Mughal cultural forms outside of the atrophied imperial court at Delhi and have been described as the principal continuation of the Mughal cultural tradition in its final century. The administrative Persian and Urdu of the successor states fed directly into the Indo-Persian literary and scholarly worlds of the 19th century and, through them, into Urdu literature and the political discourse of the emerging Indian nationalist movement.

Historiographically, the re-evaluation of the successor states since the 1970s has been central to broader revisions of the South Asian 18th century. Their study has informed theoretical debates about early modern state-formation, the relationship between commercial expansion and political fragmentation, the nature of colonialism as an historical process, and the long-term place of the Mughal legacy in modern South Asia.

== See also ==
- Mughal Empire
- Decline of the Mughal Empire
- Jagirdari crisis
- Company rule in India

== Sources ==
- Alam, Muzaffar (1986). The Crisis of Empire in Mughal North India: Awadh and the Punjab, 1707–1748. Delhi: Oxford University Press. ISBN 978-0-19-561892-1.
- Ali, M. Athar (1966) [Asia Publishing House 1966; revised OUP edition 1997]. The Mughal Nobility under Aurangzeb. Delhi: Oxford University Press. ISBN 978-0-19-565599-5.
- Barnett, Richard B. (1980). North India Between Empires: Awadh, the Mughals, and the British, 1720–1801. Berkeley: University of California Press. ISBN 978-0-520-03787-8.
- Bayly, C. A. (1983). Rulers, Townsmen and Bazaars: North Indian Society in the Age of British Expansion, 1770–1870. Cambridge: Cambridge University Press. ISBN 978-0-521-22932-6.
- Bayly, C. A. (1988). Indian Society and the Making of the British Empire. The New Cambridge History of India. Vol. II.1. Cambridge: Cambridge University Press. ISBN 978-0-521-38650-0.
- Chandra, Satish (2002) [People's Publishing House 1959]. Parties and Politics at the Mughal Court, 1707–1740. Delhi: Oxford University Press. ISBN 978-0-19-565444-8.
- Chatterjee, Kumkum (1996). Merchants, Politics, and Society in Early Modern India: Bihar, 1733–1820. Leiden: Brill. ISBN 978-90-04-10303-0.
- Faruqui, Munis D. (2012). The Princes of the Mughal Empire, 1504–1719. New York: Cambridge University Press. ISBN 978-1-107-02217-1.
- Gordon, Stewart (1993). The Marathas 1600–1818. The New Cambridge History of India. Vol. II.4. Cambridge: Cambridge University Press. ISBN 978-0-521-26883-7.
- Kolff, Dirk H. A. (1990). Naukar, Rajput and Sepoy: The Ethnohistory of the Military Labour Market in Hindustan, 1450–1850. Cambridge: Cambridge University Press. ISBN 978-0-521-38132-1.
- Leonard, Karen (1978). Social History of an Indian Caste: The Kayasths of Hyderabad. Berkeley: University of California Press. ISBN 978-0-520-03431-0.
- Leonard, Karen (1979). "The 'Great Firm' Theory of the Decline of the Mughal Empire". Comparative Studies in Society and History. 21 (2): 151–167. doi:10.1017/S0010417500012810.
- Marshall, P. J. (1987). Bengal: The British Bridgehead, Eastern India 1740–1828. The New Cambridge History of India. Vol. II.2. Cambridge: Cambridge University Press. ISBN 978-0-521-25330-7.
- Metcalf, Thomas R. (1994). Ideologies of the Raj. The New Cambridge History of India. Vol. III.4. Cambridge: Cambridge University Press. ISBN 978-0-521-39547-2.
- Richards, John F. (1993). The Mughal Empire. The New Cambridge History of India. Vol. I.5. Cambridge: Cambridge University Press. ISBN 978-0-521-56603-2.
- Sarkar, Jadunath (1950) [First edition 1932]. Fall of the Mughal Empire, Volume I: 1739–1754. Calcutta: M. C. Sarkar & Sons.
- Subrahmanyam, Sanjay; Bayly, C. A. (1988). "Portfolio Capitalists and the Political Economy of Early Modern India". Indian Economic and Social History Review. 25 (4): 401–424. doi:10.1177/001946468802500401.
- Washbrook, David (1988). "Progress and Problems: South Asian Economic and Social History c.1720–1860". Modern Asian Studies. 22 (1): 57–96. doi:10.1017/S0026749X00009288.
- Wink, André (1986). Land and Sovereignty in India: Agrarian Society and Politics under the Eighteenth-Century Maratha Svarajya. Cambridge: Cambridge University Press. ISBN 978-0-521-32064-1.

=== Primary sources ===
- Abu'l-Fazl (1873). The Ain-i-Akbari, Volume I. Translated by Blochmann, H. Calcutta: Asiatic Society of Bengal.
- Abu'l-Fazl (1894). The Ain-i-Akbari, Volumes II and III. Translated by Jarrett, H. S. Calcutta: Asiatic Society of Bengal.
- Ghulam Husain Salim (1902). Riyazu-s-Salatin: A History of Bengal. Translated by Salam, Abdus. Calcutta: Asiatic Society of Bengal.
- Tabatabai, Ghulam Husain (1832). Siyar-ul-Mutaqherin: A History of the Mahomedan Power in India during the Last Century. Translated by Briggs, John. London: Oriental Translation Fund.
