= Mir Jumla III =

Noble at the Mughal court (c. 1671–1734)

Ubaidullah Khan
- Mir Jumla

Subahdar of Bihar
- Successor: Sarbuland Khan
- Full name: Ubaidullah Shariyatullah Khan
- Born: c. 1671; Samarkand, Turan
- Died: 1734 (aged 62–63); Lucknow, Awadh, Mughal Empire
- Father: Mir Muhammad Wafa
- Religion: Islam

Ubaidullah Shariyatullah Khan (c. 1671–1734), commonly known as Mir Jumla III, was a noble who served at the court of the Mughal emperor Farrukhsiyar. He was the leader of the anti-Sayyid brothers faction of the Mughal court and exerted great influence over the Mughal emperor.

== Early life ==
Mir Jumla was born as Ubaidullah Shariyatullah Khan in 1670 or 1671 at Samarkand. His father was Mir Muhammad Wafa. He migrated to India at a young age during the reign of Mughal Emperor Aurangzeb. He was employed as a qazi (Islamic judge), initially at Jahangirnagar (present-day Dhaka) in Bengal province and later at Azimabad (present-day Patna) in Bihar. Mir Jumla became a close confidante of Azim-ush-Shan, the then governor of Bengal and Bihar, and his second son Farrukhsiyar.

== Career ==
During the Mughal war of succession in 1713, Mir Jumla secretly negotiated between Nizam-ul-Mulk and Amin Khan and persuaded them not to fight. Following Farrukhsiyar's accession to the Mughal throne in 1713, with the help of the Sayyid brothers, Mir Jumla became the head of the court faction which was against the dominance of the brothers. The members of his faction included Samsam-ud-Daulah Khan Dauran, who was a personal friend of the Emperor. On 17 January 1713, Farrukhsiyar made Mir Jumla the superintendent of the khawas and the ghusal-khana (privy council room). In June 1713, Mir Jumla was appointed governor of Bengal, with Murshid Quli Khan as his deputy. Between March 1713 and April 1714, Farrukhsiyar executed several rebels including: Saadullah Khan, a news-writer; and Sidi Qasim, a police officer.

=== Conflict with the Sayyid brothers ===
While Sayyid Hussain Ali Khan Barha was in the Deccan campaigning against the Marathas, Mir Jumla became more influential. He took advantage of a famine and manipulated Farrukhsiyar into believing that the Sayyid brothers were unfit for their offices, and that they would act as a hindrance to peace in the kingdom. The Emperor authorized Mir Jumla to sign documents on his behalf, saying: "The word and seal of Mir Jumla are the word and seal of Farrukhsiyar". Mir Jumla appointed his favourite followers to various posts, without the approval of the Prime Minister's office. This irked Sayyid Hassan Ali Khan Barha, who was also concerned that Mir Jumla was more accessible to the masses who were in search of employment, than he was.

From July 1714, the breach between the Emperor and the Sayyid brothers widened. Along with Khan Dauran, Mir Jumla was promoted in rank and selected by the Emperor to overthrow the Sayyid brothers. Mir Jumla was given charge of a further 5,000 Mughal troops. Subsequently, Mir Jumla became the de facto prime minister of the empire, replacing Sayyid Hassan. However, on the advice of Muhammad Amin Khan, the Emperor dropped the idea of directly fighting the Sayyid brothers and instead contemplated making Mir Jumla the de jure dewan (prime minister of the state). It was hoped that the Sayyid brothers would then fight against the new dewan. However, Mir Jumla made excuses and declined to take up the responsibility. Satish Chandra writes that he was an armchair warrior and not a true fighter. Despite repeated orders, none of Farrukhsiyar's nobles were prepared to fight the Sayyid brothers. As a result, he opened peace negotiations with them. They demanded that Mir Jumla be dismissed from the Mughal court and he was duly despatched to Bihar on 11 December 1714 in accordance with the treaty agreed between the Emperor and the brothers.

=== Return to Delhi ===
On 16 January 1716, Mir Jumla returned to Delhi. As news of his arrival spread in the city, the Emperor expressed his displeasure. The Sayyid brothers' complained, and Farrukhsiyar exiled him to Lahore. Mir Jumla was reluctant to leave the city and his troops broke into revolt. They claimed that they had not received their entire salary and refused to move until their dues were met. Under Mir Jumla's leadership, they surrounded the house of Muhammad Amin Khan Turani, the paymaster, and that of Khan Dauran. The siege continued for one month. Ultimately, Farrukhsiyar paid the troops ₹1 million (equivalent to ₹920 million or US$9.8 million in 2026). He also stripped Mir Jumla of his titles and dismissed him from all his posts. On 3 March, he went to the house of Nizam-ul-Mulk, who in turn sent him to Sirhind.

Mir Jumla re-entered to Delhi in September 1718. On 31 October 1718, he was granted an audience by the Emperor due to the support of Nizam-ul-Mulk. His titles were restored and Tarkhan was added to them.

== Titles ==
His full name including his titles was Mutamid-ul-Mulk, Muazzam Khan, Khan Khannan, Bahadur, Muzaffar Jang, Mir Jumla, Tarkhani, Sultani.
