= Battle of Ratanpur (1706) =

Expedition against the Maratha incursions into Gujarat led by Dhanaji Jadhav

- Part of Mughal–Maratha Wars
Date	15 March 1706
Location	Ratanpur, Gujarat
Result	Maratha victory

Belligerents
Maratha Empire	Mughal Empire

Commanders and leaders
Dhanaji Jadhav	Bidar Bakht (WIA); Safdar Khan (POW); Alim Khan (POW)

Mughal Prince Bidar Bakht launched an expedition in March 1706 against the Maratha incursions into Gujarat led by Dhanaji Jadhav. Further moves towards the Ratanpur on the Narmada River pitched him against the Marathas near Rajpipla on the eastern bank. The battle was a runaway failure for the Mughals, and Generals Safdar Khan Babi and Nazar Alim Khan were caught, the battle itself was a great loss to Mughal authority in Deccan Plateau.

== Battle ==
In November 1705, Prince Muhammad Aazam, the Subahdar of Gujarat, left Ahmadabad for an audience with Emperor Aurangzeb. Through Junnar, he reached Ahmadnagar on 25 March 1706. In his absence, Prince Bidar bakht was now the Subahdar of Gujarat, reaching Ahmadabad on 30 July 1706.

During these eight months, the Marathas, under the advantage of the weakened defenses of the province, invaded Gujarat. The Maratha army with a size of reportedly 80,000 men, led by Dhanaji Jadhav, swept through Gujarat. In response, the deputy governor of the province moved troops to challenge the Maratha advance. However, the lack of coordination amid division among the Mughal commanders mitigated their efforts to gather integrated resistance. The Mughal forces assembled at Baba Pyara Ford along the banks of the Narmada River and spent more than a month with nothing significant on the war front to justify its presence in that particular region.

In mid-March 1706, Mughal forces moved towards Ratanpur, on the eastern bank of the Narmada River near Rajpipla, when the Marathas made a frontal attack. An intense battle ensued, which cost Mughal forces very dearly. Numerous soldiers were either killed or wounded in the battle. The men of the Mughal army fled towards Broach. Two commanders of the Mogul-safdar Khan Babi and Nazar Ali Khan-were captured and later saved for a ransom amounting to eight lakh rupees. The Marathas plundered the Mughal camp, taking away supplies and baggage and carrying several prisoners with them.

Abdul Hamid Khan, the Deputy Governor of Gujarat, having received the news of the miserable condition of the Mughal army, immediately marched toward his fellow commanders with a small force for assistance. Upon reaching the Baba Pyara ford, he was encircled by the Marathas, who were many times their numerical strength and possessed a far superior force. The entire party, along with the Deputy Governor, was captured, and their camp was plundered. The Marathas, having won the battlefield, imposed chauth on the surrounding villages and territories and retired. The defeat of the Mughals at Ratnapur was a seriously damaging blow-a raging inferno whose impact significantly reduced the power, glory, and influence of the Mughals in the Deccan.

== See also ==
- Battle of Sinhagad
- Deccan wars
- Dhanaji Jadhav
