= Narasimharaopalem =

Coordinates: 17°02′N 80°50′E

- Village
- Interactive map of Narasimharaopalem
- Location in Andhra Pradesh, India
- Country: India
- State: Andhra Pradesh
- District: Krishna
- Mandal: Veerullapadu

Languages
  - Official: Telugu
- Time zone: UTC+5:30 (IST)

Narasimharaopalem is one of the smallest villages in Veerullapadu mandal of NTR district in the Indian state of Andhra Pradesh.
