= Battle of Balapur =

18th-century battle in India

- Part of Decline of Sayyid brothers
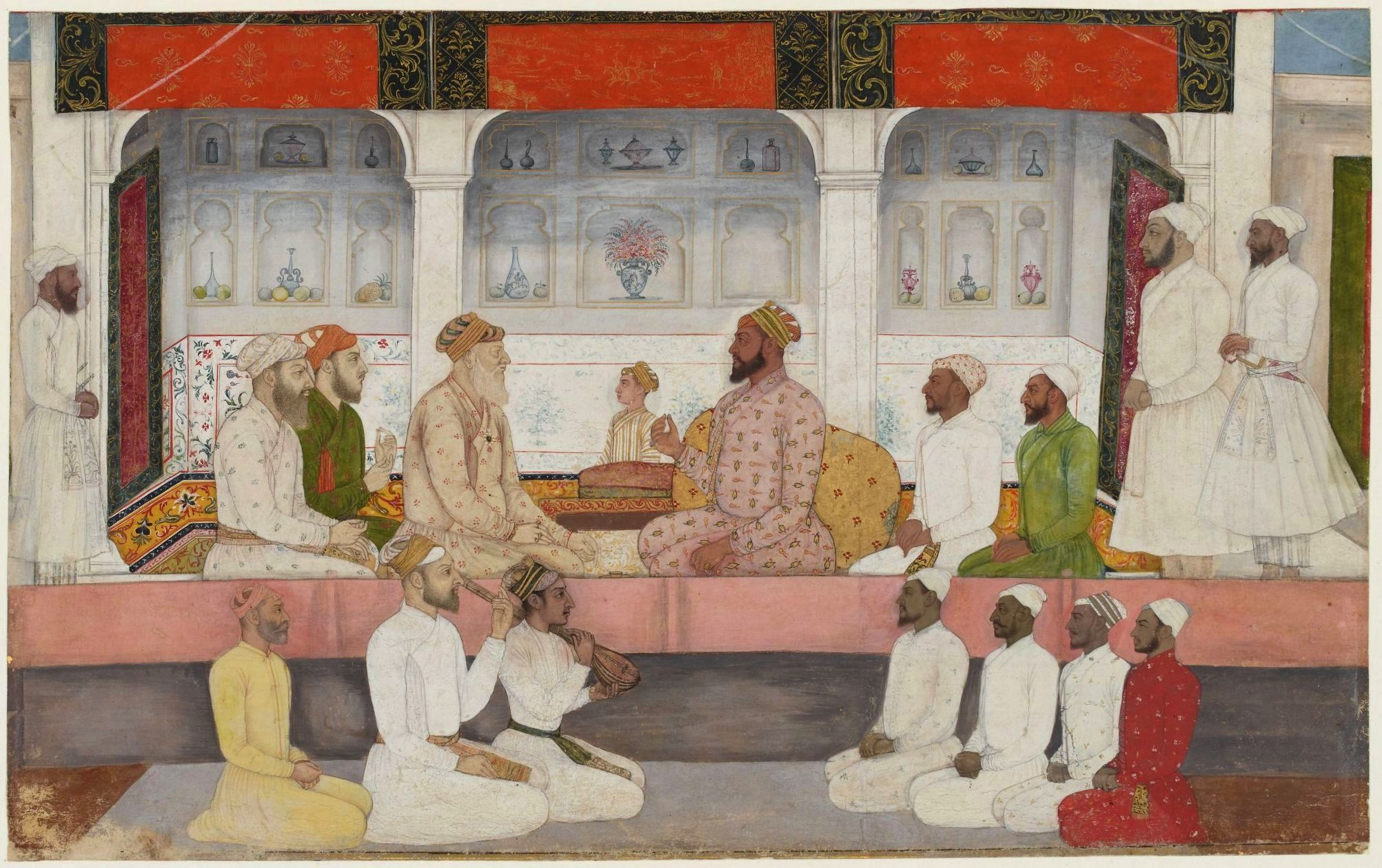
- Sayyid Abdullah Khan holding the Mughal court
Date	31 July 1720
Location	Balapur, Madhya Pradesh 21°18′41″N 76°13′44″E
Result	Nizam's victory

Belligerents
Mughal Empire (under Nizam)	Sayyid Brothers; Maratha Confederacy; Kingdom of Rohilkhand; Bundi State

Commanders and leaders
Nizam-ul-Mulk; Iwaz Khan; Ghiyas Khan; Qadar Khan; Kamayat Khan; Rao Rambha Nimbalkar	Mughals allies: Sayyid Hussain Ali Khan Barha Sayyid Salabat Khan Alam Ali Khan † Rustam Khan Amin Bahadur Anwar Khan (surrendered) Qutb ud-Daulah (surrendered); Maratha allies: Sankarji Malhar (POW) Khanderao Dabhade Santaji Sinde Kanhoji Bhonsale Bajirao I Kanhoji Bhosle Tukoji Gurjar Pilaji Jadhav Devalji Somavamshi Chimnaji Damodar Mankoji; Rohilla allies: Dost Muhammad Rohilla; Rajput allies: Bhupalsingh Mungona

Strength
14,000 Men and additional forces from chiefs	18,000 Maratha cavalry 12,000 Mughal cavalry 20,000 Rajput cavalry 20,000 Afghan forces 70,000 total

Casualties and losses
5000 Mughals	700 Marathas; Unknown number of Mughals; Unknown number of Afghans; Unknown number of Rajputs
- Location within Madhya Pradesh Battle of Balapur (India)

The Battle of Balapur marked a civil conflict among Mughal leaders, triggered by the uprising of the Sayyid Brothers. This uprising led to a decline in the status of other Mughal leaders.

The conflicts unfolded in 1720, following Nizam-u'l-Mulk's triumph over the Sayyid forces, supported by Rajputs, Marathas, and Afghans. The Sayyid forces faced successive defeats at both Burhanpur and Balapur against the Nizam forces. This sequence of events culminated in the assassination of Sayyid Hasan Ali and the subsequent downfall of the Sayyid Brothers.

== Background ==
The Sayyid brothers initially gained prominence due to their familial connection with Syed Abdullah Khan, who served as the Subahdar of Deccan and later Ajmer under Aurangzeb.

Following the demise of Mughal Emperor Bahadur Shah I, Farrukhsiyar with the help of the Sayyid brothers, orchestrated the assassination of Jahandar Shah, who was slated to succeed Bahadur Shah. Subsequently, Farrukhsiyar ascended to the Mughal throne. However, the Sayyid brothers, exercised indirect control over Farrukhsiyar's reign, effectively treating him as a puppet ruler. Farrukhsiyar met his end in 1719, as he was murdered by the Sayyid brothers. Following his assassination, Rafi ud-Darajat, Farrukhsiyar's cousin, assumed the Mughal throne. However, Rafi ud-Darajat's reign was short-lived, as he succumbed to a lung disease, adding another layer of instability to the intricate political landscape of the Mughal Empire during the early 18th century.

In September 1719, Muhammad Shah ascended the Mughal throne, and the Sayyid brothers acted as regents, effectively influencing the imperial administration for a year. This period saw a notable shift in the status of other Mansabdars within the Mughal Empire, as the Sayyid brothers' influence altered the traditional power dynamics, impacting the standing of other noble officials.

In a bid to diminish the influence of the Sayyid brothers, a revolt spearheaded by Mughal nobles, led by Nizam-ul-Mulk, unfolded. The Sayyid brothers had strategically relocated Nizam-ul-Mulk from Deccan to Malwa, appointing him as the Subahdar, with the intention of curbing his growing influence.

== Prelude ==
In 1720, Nizam-ul-Mulk, leading a force of 8,000 cavalry, marched from Malwa to strengthen his presence in the Deccan, leveraging his network of allies. Responding to this, Dilawar Ali Khan, under the directives of the Sayyid brothers, moved to impede Nizam's progress. Additionally, Alam Ali Khan was dispatched from Aurangabad to confront Nizam, marking a significant military engagement in the ongoing power struggle within the Mughal Empire.

Nizam's expedition to the Deccan was prompted by his awareness of the potential takeover of the region by the Sayyids. Suspecting Nizam's sudden deployment, the Sayyids dispatched Dilawar Ali Khan to the Deccan to monitor his movements. Dilawar Ali Khan led Mughal forces, including Rajput commanders such as Raja Bhim Singh of Bundi and Raja Gaj Singh of Narwar, and the Rohilla Afghan leader Dost Muhammad Rohilla along with other chiefs comprising a force of 40,000 men. Alam Ali Khan, the Mughal commander aligned with the Sayyids, received a warning about Nizam's march toward the Deccan.

Muhammad Ghiyas Khan, a trusted officer of Nizam, advised him to abandon the campaign, emphasizing that there was no benefit in risking one's life. In response, Nizam resolutely declared:

"Why speak thus! Still, I am in perplexity. that I have done no wrong is plain, nor need I feel ashamed. I have lived respected from the days of the late Alamgir until now, and for the few more days that may be vouchsafed me. I trust I may be saved from dishonour. Why do these parvenus try to harm me, merely because they are puffed up by their sudden elevation. Such an attitude is becoming in an Emperor; if others gain a little rise in life, why need they lose their heads. Thanks God on High, who is there that shall not himself receive what he has done to others? But it is not for me to begin. If in spite of my quiescence they attack me, there is no help for it. After all, I am human. What man is there. holding my high station who would not his honour? Victory lies hidden from us, it is the gift of the Most High, and not gained by the greatness of a host. I swear by the God that made me, that they may bring all Hindustan against me and I will still resist undaunted. If longer life has been decreed me, no harm will arrive, if the hour of departure is at hand. nothing can avail me."

— Nizam

=== At Burhanpur ===
Recognizing Nizam's approach, Alam Ali Khan took preemptive action and dispatched a detachment led by Anwar Khan and Qutb-ud Daulah, the faujdar of Burhanpur, towards Aurangabad. Meanwhile, Ghiyas Khan had initiated the plunder of Burhanpur. The faujdar engaged in open battle but suffered defeat, ultimately surrendering Asigarh and Burhanpur to Nizam-ul-Mulk. This victory strategically positioned Nizam in a favorable position during the conflict. The Nizam now increased his force to 14,000, and additional supply from his chief allies. This detachment joined forces with Rao Rambha Nimbalkar, a Maratha leader.

Following the initial setback, Alam Ali Khan received letters from the Sayyid brothers instructing him to collaborate with the Marathas and other faujdars. This directive signalled a shift in strategy, aiming to forge alliances with regional powers to counter the advancing forces of Nizam-ul-Mulk. Shahu I dispatched 18,000 horsemen, led by Khanderao Dabhade, Santaji Sinde and Kanhoji Bhosle to reinforce the Sayyids. Thus, Alam Ali Khan managed to have a total of 30,000 horsemen.

However, rather than confronting Alam Ali's forces, Nizam-ul-Mulk directed his march against Dilawar Ali Khan. Nizam established his camp near Ratanpur, under the control of the Raja of Makrai. Dilawar Khan's forces, comprising Rajputs and Afghanis, numbered 40,000 men.

On 19 June 1720, the battle unfolded between the Narmada River and Burhanpur, at a location known as Pandhar. Ghiyas Khan and Iwaz Khan orchestrated a dual-sided attack on the Sayyid forces. At a crucial juncture, the Sayyid forces counterattacked the Nizam forces at the center, during which Dilawar Khan met his demise. Prominent Rajput leaders, including Rajah Gaj Singh and Rao Bhim Singh, also fell in battle. Faced with substantial casualties, the Sayyid forces were compelled to retreat from the field of engagement.

== At Balapur ==
Upon learning of the defeat at Pandhar, Alam Ali Khan received advice from the Sayyids to refrain from attacking Nizam until Hussain Ali Khan's arrival. However, he decided to press forward and encountered Nizam at Balapur. Bajirao came up with the Nizam's troops near Pohur on 15 July. A significant battle unfolded on 31 July 1720, where notable figures like Sayyid Wali and Sayyid Alam Barha, along with many other renowned captains, fell on the battlefield. Despite Alam Ali Khan's valiant efforts, he became surrounded and succumbed to his injuries. On the final day of the battle, 31 July, Bajirao was stationed at Nimbgaon in Balapur. However, he did not participate in the conflict between Alam Ali and Nizam, as Shahu had ordered him to remain neutral and seek Marathas' advantage in the same. Following the defeat of Sayyid-Maratha forces, Bajirao retired with his forces through Khandesh. The disarrayed remnants of his army fled in panic, leaving their belongings to be plundered by Nizam's forces. Seven hundred Marathas were killed and Sankarji Malhar was captured alive. Nizam-ul-Mulk's Letter about the battle of Balapur:

"On Sunday the 6th of the month of Shawal (31st July 1720), trusting in God, I marched to punish the Marathas and their supporters. I traversed a distance of 4 Kos. The enemy, proud of his numbers, had pitched his tents at that place. He had arranged his army and the artillery and was ready for the fight. Owing to the scarcity of bullocks our heavy artillery had remained behind. It was decided to engage the enemy in a hand to hand fight. The following were among the opposing Alam Ali Khan, Rustam Khan, Amin Bahadur, Tahawur Khan, Ali Jan, Munhe Khan, Tahawur Dil Khan, Salabat Khan, Shujat Ali Khan, Pur Dil Khan, Latif Khan, Muhammadali Beg Khan, Giyasuddin Khan, Mirza Ali Yusuf Khan, Umar Khan, Wase Ali Khan, Sirajuddin Khan, Nahar Khan Dakhni, Khan Zaman Khan, Matlab Khan, Abu Talib Khan, Mansur Khan, Gulam Rasul Khan, Muhammad Ashraf Khan, Turk Taz Khan, Haris Khan, Behramand Khan, Pimaji Shinde, Sultanji Thorat, Appaji Rustam Khani, and Pimrao were there with all their forces. Shankarji, Baji (Bajirao), the son of Balaji Vishwanath, the Peshwa of Raja Shahu I, Khandoji Dabhade Senspati, Kanhoji Bhosle, Tukoji Gurjar, Pilaji Jadhav, Devalji Somavamshi, Chimnaji Damodar, Mankoji and other Maratha chiefs were on the left wing of the army. In the battle the guns were soon given up and both sides took to swords. The enemy tried to attack from the left wing. They attacked our rear guard. But they were repulsed. Alam Ali Khan had decided to sacrifice his life. He stood his ground stoutly. Heavy fighting continued for two Gharis. Our army fought gallantly. The enemy too did not spare any effort. last the grace of God was on this servant. Alam Ali Khan with some of his chiefs and many of his colleagues was killed. Many were wounded and captured. Shankaraji Malhar was captured alive. On our side, Aiwaz Khan, Mutawassil Khan, Muhammad Giyas Khan, Qadar Khan, and Kamyat Khan exerted themselves well. By God's grace they are safe and sound."

— Nizam

== Aftermath ==
After experiencing two consecutive defeats, Sayyid Hussain Ali Khan personally led a march from Delhi towards the Deccan. However, on the journey, he was assassinated by Mir Haider Beg in a location between Jiund and Biund, two kilometers away from Toda Bhim. Learning of Hussain Ali's demise, the Sayyids in Delhi launched an attack on the Mughals with the intention of capturing Emperor Muhammad Shah. But they suffered a decisive defeat at the hands of the Mughal forces. As a grim symbol, the head of Hussain Ali Khan was displayed at the entrance of the market.

The Emperor issued orders (farmans) to Nizam-ul-Mulk, Girdhar Bahadur, Abdul Samad Khan, and Raja Jai Singh. In these decrees, he recounted the betrayal by the Sayyid brothers, detailed the events leading to the murder of Husain Ali, and instructed them to unite in support of his throne against Sayyid Abdullah Khan.

== See also ==
- Decline of the Mughal Empire
- Maratha capture of Mughals
- Maratha conquest of North-west India
- Sikh attacks on Delhi
