= Battle of Shakar Kheda =

1724 battle

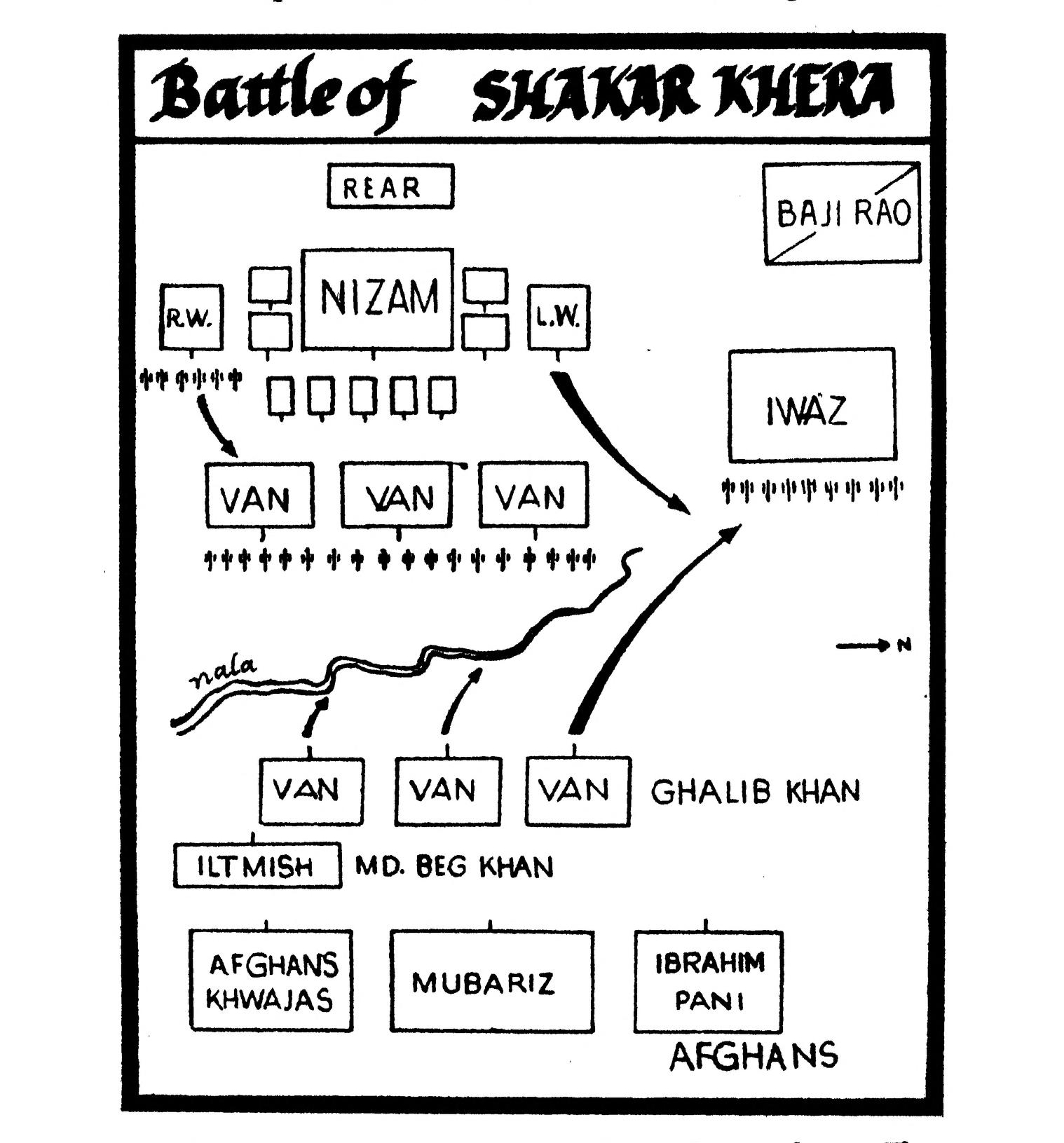
- Battle of Shakar Kheda 11 Oct 1724
Date	11 October 1724
Location	Shakar Kheda, Buldhana, Berar Subah, Mughal Empire
Result	Nizam victory

Belligerents
Nizam of Hyderabad; Maratha Empire	Mughal Empire

Commanders and leaders
Nizam-ul-Mulk; Peshwa Bajirao I Iwaz Khan; Mutawassil Khan	Mubariz Khan †; Raghuji Jadhav †

Strength
Unknown	Unknown

Casualties and losses
Unknown at lightly	Unknown but moderate to heavy

The Battle of Shakar Kheda took place on 11 October 1724 at (Fathekheda) in Berar Subah and 350 kilometres from Aurangabad between Nizam-ul-Mulk, Asaf Jah I and Mubariz Khan, Subedar of the Deccan.

== Prelude ==
In 1714, Mughal emperor Farrukhsiyar appointed Nizam-ul-Mulk, Asaf Jah I as Viceroy of the Deccan. Deccan consisted of six Mughal governorates (Subah): Khandesh, Bijapur, Berar Subah, Aurangabad, Hyderabad Subah, Bidar, and Carnatic region was sub-Subah administered partly by the governor of Bijapur and Hyderabad. In 1721, Nizam was commissioned to Delhi and became Prime Minister of the Mughal Empire. His differences with the court nobles led him to resign from all the imperial responsibilities in 1723 and leave for Deccan.

Under the influence of Nizam's opponents, Mughal Emperor Muhammad Shah issued a decree to Mubariz Khan, the governor of Hyderabad Subah, to prevent the Nizam from taking the Deccan province under his control. Nizam and Mubariz Khan confronted each other at Shakar Kheda (a valley in present-day Buldhana district, Berar Subah, 140 kilometres (87 mi) from Aurangabad), resulting in the Battle of Shakar Kheda.

== Events ==
It is reported that Mubariz Khan initiated a march from Hyderabad to engage Nizam-ul-Mulk in battle. The conflict between the two factions resulted in an encounter at Shakar Kheda, during which Nizam-ul-Mulk emerged victorious despite facing significant challenges. The battle ultimately led to the demise of Mubariz Khan. However, there is no available source to verify this information. It is reported that the officers and soldiers who took part in the battle received rewards in the form of cash and titles following Nizam-ul-Mulk's decisive victory. According to historical accounts, Mubariz Khan, a prominent figure, embarked on a march from Hyderabad to engage in battle with Nizam-ul-Mulk The latter, who was a skilled military leader, was reportedly well-prepared for the impending conflict. The two factions met at Shakar Kheda, where they clashed in a fierce battle. Despite facing great odds, Nizam-ul-Mulk emerged victorious and succeeded in killing Mubariz Khan, who was a formidable opponent.

However, there is no available citation to corroborate this information. Following Nizam-ul-Mulk's decisive victory, it is reported that officers and soldiers who had participated in the battle were rewarded with cash and titles. The rewards were a testament to the bravery and valour displayed by the soldiers during the battle. However, the exact nature and extent of the rewards are unclear.

== Aftermath ==
In June in the year 1725, Emperor Muhammad Shah, who was renowned for his influence and power as a ruler of the Mughal Empire, made a significant decision. He chose to reinstate Nizam-ul-Mulk as the Subedar of the Deccan province, a position that Nizam-ul-Mulk had previously held in 1721 to 1723. Nizam-ul-Mulk was known for his skilful administration of the province and therefore his reappointment was a testament to his abilities.

In recognition of Nizam-ul-Mulk's exceptional service and loyalty to the Mughal Empire, Emperor Muhammad Shah conferred upon him the prestigious title of Asaf Jahi dynasty. This title symbolized high honour and distinction and was reserved only for those who had demonstrated exceptional service and loyalty to the Mughal Empire. The conferment of this title was a reflection of Nizam-ul-Mulk's unwavering dedication to the Empire and his tireless efforts to ensure the prosperity of the Deccan province.

During the Battle of Shakar Kheda, under the order of Shahu I, Bajirao I, the Maratha Peshwa, provided invaluable support to Nizam of Hyderabad. His assistance proved to be crucial in securing the victory in the battle. In recognition of Bajirao's contribution, Nizam-ul-Mulk rewarded him with 7,000 Mansabdars and 7,000 horses, which were seen as a symbol of honour and prestige.
