= Gollapalem =

- Village
- Interactive map of Gollapalem
- Location in Andhra Pradesh, India
- Coordinates: 16.370119°N 81.532215°E
- Country: India
- State: Andhra Pradesh
- Districts: Krishna

Languages
  - Official: Telugu
- Time zone: UTC+5:30 (IST)

Pedda Gollapalem is a village in Nidamarru hamlet, Kruthivennu mandal, located in Krishna district on the sea coast of Bay of Bengal, Andhra Pradesh, India.

== History ==
The village was formed in 1905 and is close to the town of Bhimavaram. It is believed that two brothers, Chinna Golladu and Pedda Golladu, had governed this village. There is a bungalow constructed during the British rule which is now called a choultry governed by the Village Panchayat.

The village had no communication links with other villages until 1995 when paved roads were constructed. The villagers' main source of income is the sale of "Kallu", a drink derived from palm trees. In 1988, Jane Mc Bride came to the village from the US and founded Village Children's Home & School.

== Geography ==
Gollapalem is a village panchayat located in the East Godavari district of Andhra-Pradesh state, India at latitude 15.807605 and longitude 80.220892.
