= Nizam-ul-Mulk, Asaf Jah I =

Nizam of Hyderabad from 1724 to 1748

Nizam-ul-Mulk Asaf Jah I
- Chin Qilich Khan, Nizam-ul-Mulk; Asaf Jah
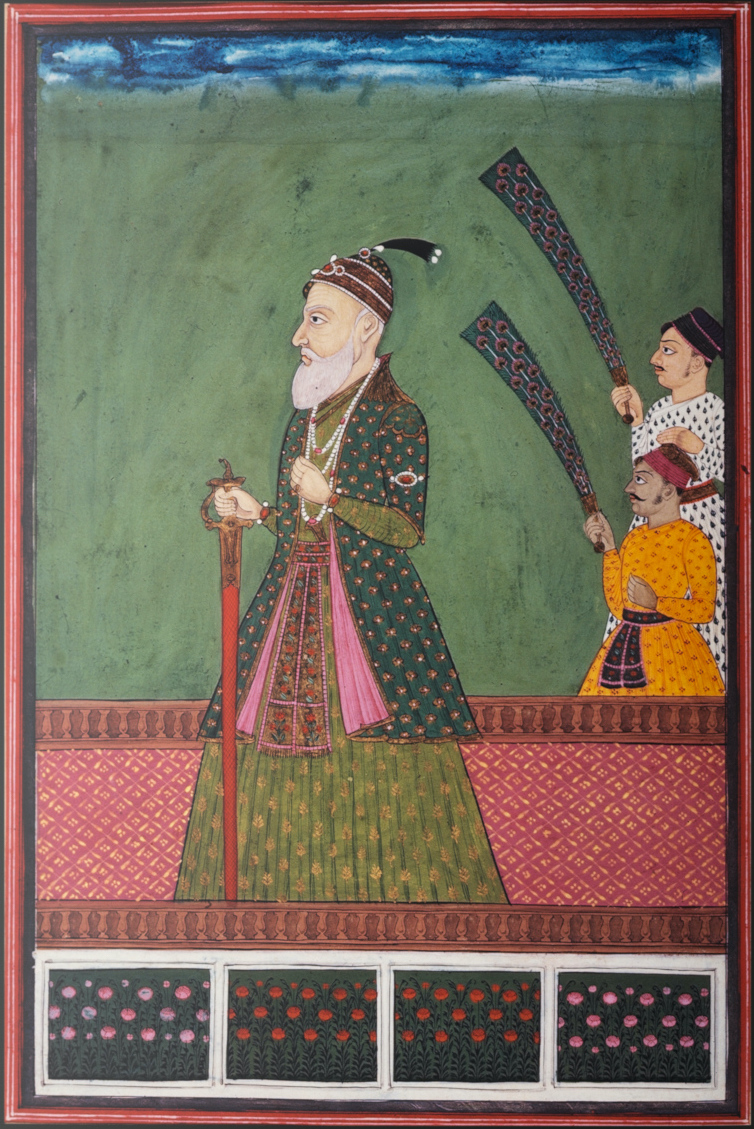
- Nizam-ul-Mulk c. 1745

1st Nizam of Hyderabad
- Reign: 31 July 1724 – 1 June 1748
- Tenure: c. 1677–1748
- Predecessor: Position Established
- Successor: Nasir Jang Mir Ahmad
- Full name: Mir Qamar-ud-din Khan Chin Qilich Siddiqi Nizam-ul-Mulk Asaf Jah I
- Years active: c. 1677–1748
- Born: 11 August 1671; Agra, Agra Subah, Mughal India
- Died: 1 June 1748 (aged 76); Burhanpur, Hyderabad Deccan
- Buried: Khuldabad (near Aurangabad), Hyderabad State, Mughal India (now in Maharashtra, India)
- Noble family: Asaf Jahi Dynasty
- Spouses: Umda Begum; Said-un-Nisa Begum
- Issue: Firuz Jung; Nasir Jung; Salabat Jung; Asaf Jah II; Basalat Jung; Humayun Jah; Khair-un-Nisa Begum; Mukarrama Banu Begum; Khan Bahadur Begum
- Father: Nawab Ghazi ud-Din Khan Feroze Jung I
- Mother: Safiya Khanum
- Military career
- Allegiance: Mughal Empire
- Branch: Nizam of Hyderabad
- Rank: Nizam; Grand Vizier (formerly); Subahdar (formerly); Faujdar (formerly); Sowar (formerly)
- Conflicts: See list: Sayyid Brothers; Battle of Ratanpur (1720); Battle of Balapur (1720); Marathas; Deccan Wars (1680-1707); Siege of Wagingera (1704); Battle of Bhopal (1737); Mughals; Battle of Shakar Kheda (1724); Mughal-Persian Wars; Nader's invasion (1738-39); Battle of Karnal (1739)

Mir Qamar-ud-din Khan Siddiqi (11 August 1671 – 1 June 1748) also known as Chin Qilich Qamaruddin Khan, Nizam-ul-Mulk, Asaf Jah and Nizam I, was the first Nizam of Hyderabad.

He began his career during the reign of the Mughal emperor Aurangzeb, who made him a general. Following the death of Aurangzeb in 1707, Asaf Jah preferred to remain neutral, refusing to favour any one of Aurangzeb's warring sons. When Aurangzeb's third son Bahadur Shah ultimately emerged victorious, Asaf Jah was rotated as governor of multiple Mughal provinces until 1714, when he was appointed as Viceroy of the Deccan with authority over six Mughal provinces in southern India from 1714 to 1719. From 1719 onwards, he was involved in combating the intrigues of the Sayyid brothers. From 1720 to 1722, he helped the new Mughal emperor Muhammad Shah in eliminating the Sayyid brothers and was elevated, as a reward, to the grand viziership from 1722 to 1724.

Political intrigues compelled Asaf Jah to rebel against the emperor and in 1724 Muhammad Shah was forced to recognize Asaf Jah as the permanent Viceroy of the Deccan. Later that year Asaf Jah proclaimed himself Nizam and began the Asaf Jahi dynasty, with himself as its first ruler. The Nizam-ruled Deccan essentially became a tributary state of the Marathas following his defeat at the hands of Peshwa Bajirao I in 1728.

== Background ==
Mir Qamar-ud-din Khan was the son of Ghazi ud-Din Khan and Safiya Khanum, the daughter of Sa'adullah Khan Chinioti. Sa'adullah Khan was a Punjabi Muslim noble who was the grand vizier (1645–1656) of Mughal emperor Shah Jahan; during his tenure construction of Taj Mahal was completed. His paternal grandfather Kilich Khan hailed from Samarkand in present-day Uzbekistan. In 1654, Kilich Khan came to India for the first time while on his way to the Hajj (Islamic pilgrimage) during the reign of Mughal emperor Shah Jahan. After completing the pilgrimage, he migrated to India and joined erstwhile Mughal prince Aurangzeb's army in the Deccan in 1657. Khan fought in the Battle of Samugarh which ended with the defeat of Aurangzeb's brother Dara Shikoh. Besides being a commander in Aurangzeb's army, he also served as governor of Zafarabad (present-day Bidar). Khan's eldest son and Nizam-ul-Mulk's father Ghazi ud-Din Khan migrated to India in 1669, and got employed in Aurangzeb's army, raised a General and later as governor of Gujarat.

== Early life ==
He was born on 11 August 1671 as Mir Qamaruddin Khan to Ghazi ud-Din Khan and his first wife Safia Khanum (Wazir-un-Nisa Begum) at Agra, the name was given to him by the Mughal Emperor Aurangazeb.

Mir Qamaruddin was educated privately. Due to his long residence in the Deccan, he adopted the flowing robes of the Marathas, tight in the waist, and made obeisance in the Deccan fashion. He wrote poetry in Urdu in the typical Deccani style of the age. In 1677 aged six, Mir Qamaruddin accompanied his father to the Mughal court. Aurangzeb awarded him a Mansab. Mir Qamaruddin displayed considerable skill as a warrior and in his teens he began accompanying his father into battles, for which Mir Qamaruddin Khan received a rank of 400 zaat and 100 sowar in 1684. In 1688 aged 17 he joined his father in the successful assault on the fort of Adoni and was promoted to the rank of 2000 zaat and 500 sowar and presented with the finest Arab steed with gold trappings and a pastille perfumed with ambergris from the Mughal court. In 1690 aged 19 he was bestowed with the title Chin Qilich Khan (boy swordsman) and was gifted with a female elephant by Aurangazeb. In 1693, the Marathas besieged the Panhala Fort. In response, Mir Qamaruddin fought and defeated the Marathas at Karad. 30 Marathas were taken prisoner. In 1698, Aurangzeb sent Mir Qamaruddin to put down a revolt at Nagori, near Bijapur. The emperor was satisfied with his expedition and subsequently sent him to Kotha to restore order. Following his success, he was raised to a rank of 3,000 zaat and 500 Sowar. In 1699 Aurangzeb promoted him to 3,500 zaat and 3,000 Sowar. Mir Qamaruddin successfully sieged the Panhala Fort which was occupied by the Marathas. He closed all the roads as a result of which no supply could reach the inhabitants. The fort fell to his forces on 9 June 1700. Satisfied with his services, Aurangzeb made him the faujdar (garrison commander) of Bijapur and increased his rank by 400 "Sowar".

== Career ==
=== After Aurangzeb ===
The disintegration of the Mughal empire which Aurangzeb had well established, began upon Aurangzeb's death in 1707. The Sayyid brothers (Sayyid Hussain Ali Khan and Sayyid Hassan Ali Khan Barha) became highly influential in the Mughal Court after Aurangzeb's death and became king makers during the anarchy following the death of emperor Aurangzeb in 1707. They created conflict in the Mughal court by eliminating and appointing new emperor one after other. When Bahadur Shah I (1707-1712) died, his successor Jahandar Shah (1712-1713) was assassinated and his nephew Farrukhsiyar (1713–1719) became the emperor with the support of the Sayyid brothers, Farrukhsiyar was later blinded, deposed and murdered and his first cousin Rafi ud-Darajat (February–June 1719) became Emperor and died of lung disease, when his elder brother Rafi ud-Daulah (June–September 1719) became Emperor who also died of lung disease, thus Muhammad Shah (1719–1748) the grandson of Bahadur Shah I from his fourth son Jahan Shah ascended the throne at the age of 17 years with the Sayyid brothers as his regents.

=== Later Mughals and Asaf Jah ===
After Aurangzeb died in 1707, Asaf Jah was appointed Governor of Oudh. After Bahadur Shah I's death in 1712 Asaf Jah opted for a private life in Delhi. His sabbatical was cut short when in 1714 Farrukhsiyar appointed Asaf Jah I as Viceroy of the Deccan—(administrator of six Mughal governorates) with the title Nizam-ul-Mulk (Administrator of the Realm) and Fateh Jung. In 1719, Asaf Jah was then called upon by Farrukhsiyar to help fight off the Sayyid brothers, Farrukhsiyar lost his strife against the Sayyid brothers and was killed in 1719. In due course from 1719 to 1722, Asaf Jah I was on a mission to eradicate the Sayyid brothers from the Mughal court and to make this happen he organized and promoted Central Asian nobles in the Mughal court against the Sayyid brothers, in 1720 he captured the forts of Asirgarh and Burhanpur in Deccan and killed Mir Alam Ali Khan, the adopted son of Sayyid Hussain Ali Khan, who was the Deputy Subahdar of the Deccan. Muhammad Shah with the help of Asaf Jah, got Sayyid Hussain Ali Khan murdered in 1720 and Sayyid Hassan Ali Khan Barha poisoned in 1722, Muhammad Shah assumed an independent Mughal Emperor and as a reward in 1722, Asaf Jah was appointed as Grand Vazir (Prime Minister) of the Mughal Empire. As a Grand Vazir Asaf Jah's attempts to reform the court corruption created for him many enemies. In 1723, Asaf Jah's differences with the court noble increased and alarmed by his growing power, Muhammad Shah transferred him from the court of Delhi to Awadh. Nizam rebelled against the order, resigned as the Grand vizier left all imperial responsibilities and marched towards the Deccan by the end of the year 1723. Under the influence of Asaf Jah's opponents, Muhammad Shah issued a decree to Mubariz Khan-the Governor of Hyderabad, to stop Asaf Jah which resulted in the Battle of Shakar Kheda. In 1724, Asaf Jah I defeated Mubariz Khan and in response the Mughal emperor recognized him as the viceroy of the Deccan.

=== Governor of Bijapur ===
Mir Qamar-ud-din became the subahdar (governor) of Bijapur in 1702 and was awarded a steed by Emperor Aurangzeb. In the same year, he was also given the faujdari of Azamnagar and Belgaum. In 1704, he became the faujdar of Nusratabad and Mudgal. In 1705 Mir Qamar-ud-din survived the attacks during the Siege of Wagingera Fort, and led an assault in the hillock of Lal Tikri. He attacked the Marathas who were attempting to provide supplies to the besieged inhabitants at Vardhangad Fort. The Marathas were ultimately defeated. Mir Qamar-ud-din was raised to a rank of 5,000 zaat and 5,000 "Sowar" for his performance in the siege. He was also awarded with a jewelled sabre and an elephant.

=== Viceroy of the Deccan ===
On 10 January 1713, Mughal prince Farrukhsiyar defeated Mughal Emperor Jahandar Shah in the Battle of Agra and later killed him, One of Mughal general Zulfiqar Khan Nusrat Jung aided and intrigues Jahandar Shah after the death of his father Bahadur Shah I in 1712 to overcame all his brothers-(including the battle in which Azim-ush-Shan the father of Farrukhsiyar was drowned in the Ravi River) and ascended the throne of Mughal Emperor, in return, Zulfiqar Khan was made Grand vizier, "Amir-ul-Umara" and Viceroy of the Deccan all at once. Zulfiqar Khan was captured and strangled to death in 1713 AD with the orders of Farrukhsiyar.

In 1713 Farrukhsiyar appointed Mir Qamaruddin as Viceroy of the Deccan—(administrator of six Mughal governorates) and Faujdar of Carnatic region with the title Nizam-ul-Mulk (Administrator of the Realm) and Fateh Jung (Conqueror of battles). He was a competent diplomatic person and accomplished his responsibilities very well, he eventually organized the administration, augmented finances and obtained full control over the Deccan including Carnatic region, the Nizam abrogated Maratha's from collecting Chauth in the region under his control which was granted by his predecessors. Nizam had been with Aurangzeb throughout his Deccan campaign. He was aware of the territory as well as the native communities for which he avoided confrontation with the Marathas and locals, rather he reduced the growing influence of Marathas in Deccan by bringing Sambhaji II of Kolhapur to his side and appointing the rival Maratha generals (Maratha generals, Candrasen Jadhav, Sultanji Nimbalkar and Raja Ramabha Rao Bahadur) under his services.In 1715 AD, Farrukhsiyar under the influence of Sayyed brothers, call back Nizam to Delhi, and replaced Sayyid Hussain Ali Khan (one among the Sayyed brothers) as the viceroy of Deccan.

=== Governor of Malwa ===
The Sayyid brothers, known as the badshahgar (king-makers), became the sole authority of Mughal court reducing the status of the Turkic and the Irani noblemen. As a result, they formed a force of counter-revolution against the Sayyid brothers. The head of the Counter-Revolution was Nizam. To subdue the counter-revolution, the Sayyid brothers shifted Nizam-ul-mulk from Delhi. In 1715 AD, the Nizam was appointed as the Governor of Malwa (central India), a lesser position than the previous post. in 1716 AD Nizam unwillingly accepted the new post so that he could reinforce his forces against the Sayyid brothers and check and halt the increasing influence of Marathas in the central India region.

In 1719, Nizam became suspicious of the machination of the Sayyed brothers and understood their intentions to take over the Mughal Empire. When two of the Mughal Emperors died simultaneously within a year due to the same ailment and Muhammad Shah the 18-year-old Mughal prince was appointed Mughal Emperor and Sayyid Brothers as regent to the Mughal Emperor, the Nizam commence full-fledged preparation to launch an armed action against them. When the Sayyid Brothers learned about the Nizam's situation, they got furious and issued an imperial order asking the Nizam to report to Delhi. Alternately they planned an attack on Nizam in case he did not report. Meanwhile, Nizam received a secret communication from the Mughal empress's mother "Resist the Sayyids, and you will find yourself a place of Honor in the history of Mughals, May Allah help you in a war of righteousness against suppression", and later a secret communication was sent by Emperor Muhammad Shah to get him relief from the atrocities of Sayyid Brothers. Nizam was convinced of the Sayyid Brothers' planning and refused to report to Delhi and decided to eliminate the Sayyid brothers.

In Delhi, the Sayyid brothers released an imperial order to attack Nizam's forces from two fronts, thus dispatched a 20,000 imperial army of Delhi led by Dilawar Khan to attack from the North and the Army of Governor of Aurangabad led by Alim Ali (the adopted son of Sayyid Hussain Ali Khan) to attack from South. Nizam being a military strategist rather than marching towards Delhi decided to move southwards to the Deccan where he had many sympathizers to support. The Nizam utilizing his diplomatic manipulation occupied Asirgarh Fort from Mughals and left Ujjain towards Burhanpur. His army clashed with Dilawar Khan aided by Maratha reinforcement near Burhanpur (Khandwa) in June 1720, Dilawar Khan and Marathas were defeated and Nizam took over Burhanpur. Sayyed brothers hopeless with the battle result issued an imperial order appointing Nizam as Viceroy of Deccan.

Mughal empress's mother alarmed Nizam that "Plans are already being made to mount a strong invasion of the south, be on your guard" Meanwhile Sayyed brothers ordered Alim Ali-(Uninformed by Sayyed brothers about Nizam's appointment as Viceroy of Deccan) to march towards Nizam and stop him from reaching Aurangabad. Nizam wanted to avoid any war against a 20-year-old Alim Ali and sent his envoy, but all his efforts to avoid war went in vain when in July 1720 AD Alim Ali approached with his army, though Alim Ali fought with bravery he lost against Nizam well-equipped army. Frustrated with the defeat of Alim Ali, the Sayyed brothers now decided to attack with a much larger imperial army of 50,000 led by Emperor Muhammad Shah, they decided to move towards the south by collecting reinforcement from Rajputana. While the Mughal army was encamped in the outskirts of Delhi, a plot was devised against the Sayyid brothers and a section of Nizam's sympathizers a Turkic soldier assassinated the commander and chief of the Mughal Army Sayyid Hussain (one of Sayyed Brothers) on 9 October 1720. When Abdullah Khan was informed about the death of his brother, he became furious and marched towards Delhi from Agra to avenge his brother's murder, he led an army against the Emperor Muhammad Shah with his own puppet Emperor, Ibrahim. Muhammad Shah assigned Nizam's uncle and sympathizer Muhammad Amin Khan Turani to march towards Agara to deal with Abdullah Khan, the battle was fought near Hasanpur, and most of Abdullah Khan army deserted him, Abdullah Khan personally fought on foot following the Barha tradition and was captured in November 1720, and eventually being poisoned while in captivity. Muhammad Shah was crowned Emperor without any regent and Muhammad Amin Khan Turani was appointed as the first Grand vizier. Nizam chose to continue his stay in Deccan and when Muhammad Amin Khan Turani died in 1721, he was offered the position of the Grand Vizier of the Mughal Empire.

=== Grand Vizier of Mughal Empire ===
In 1721 AD, Nizam ul-Mulk was rewarded for eliminating the Sayyid brothers with the post of Vakil-i-Mutlaq and grand vizier in the court of Muhammad Shah, the 18-year-old successor. From Muhammad Shah's point of view, he expected Asaf Jah I to act as an elderly statesman and faithful servant of the emperor, but the cunning Asaf Jah proved to be more self-willed and attempted to use his influence with the emperor to increase his territorial ambitions in the Deccan. With the pretext of restoring law and order in Gujarat, he sent there an expedition and appointed his maternal uncle, the relative of Sa'adullah Khan Chinioti (سعد الله خان) named Hamid Khan, to administer Gujarat. Hamid Khan engaged Shujaat Khan Gujarati in battle and shot him with an arrow in the chest while on top of his elephant, and finally entered Ahmedabad as a conqueror. Shujaat Khan Gujarati's brother, Rustam Ali Khan, who had advanced towards Ahmedabad was also defeated with the aid of two Maratha commanders. Muhammad Shah sent Sarbuland Khan to punish Hamid Khan. As Sarbuland Khan opposed this mission, with his request Muhammad Shah released Sayyid Najmuddin Ali Khan Barha from prison to join his imperial army, with the reward of the governorship of Ajmer. Although a large number of Sarbuland Khan's men fell, in the heat of battle Shaikh Allahyar Khan delivered the victory to the imperialists. Both Hamid Khan and the Marathas suffered heavy losses. As a result, Hamid Khan departed to Aurangabad in the Deccan. Thus the Nizam failed to win the confidence of the Emperor and lost in the estimation of the nobles. For the Nizam, his desire to restore the decorum of Mughals lapsed when some courtiers, cliques of corrupt concubines and eunuchs along with harlots and jesters who were the Emperor's constant companions became Nizam's enemy and coercively built distrust in the mind of Emperor about Nizam's growing power, thou Muhammad Shah had been dependent entirely upon the policies and courage of the Nizam, he transferred him from the court of Delhi to Awadh in 1723 AD. Muhammad Shah was young and foolish and allowed his confidants to make remarks about him when he had made his obeisance in the Deccan fashion, which created a grudge between them. His efforts were misrepresented and thwarted by the nobles close to the Emperor. Nizam rebelled against the imperial order, abdicated as the Grand Vizier and marched towards the Deccan against the will of Mughal Emperor Muhammad Shah. Under the influence of Nizam's opponents, Muhammad Shah issued a decree to Mubariz Khan-the Governor of Hyderabad, and a former ally of the Barha Sayyids, to stop and kill the Nizam which resulted in the Battle of Shakar Kheda. In 1724, with the help of the Marathas, Asaf Jah I defeated Mubariz Khan and in response, the Mughal emperor was forced to recognize him as the viceroy of the Deccan with the title of Asaf Jah.

=== Nizam of Hyderabad ===
On 11 October 1724, the Nizam established autonomous rule over the Deccan region and started what came to be known as the Asaf Jahi dynasty. Subsequent rulers retained the title Nizam ul-Mulk and were referred to as Asaf Jahi Nizams, or Nizams of Hyderabad. Nizam remained loyal to the Mughal Emperor, did not assume any imperial title, and continued to acknowledge Mughal suzerainty. He acquired de facto control over Deccan and thus all six Mughal viceregal governorates of Deccan became his feudatory.

In 1725 AD, as a sovereign ruler, the Nizam wanted to strengthening the Deccan by controlling the growing influence of the Marathas, he confronted and defeated Maratha forces and prevented them from collecting levies in Carnatic region—(it was granted to Marathas by his predecessor Mughal Viceroy of Deccan in 1719 AD). In 1726 AD Sambhaji II of Kolhapur sought the Nizam's arbitration to settle issues with Shahu I of Satara which Shahu declined, thus in 1727 AD the Nizam armies captured Pune and appointed Sambhaji II as Chhatrapati. These valorous acts of the Nizam started an extended series of conflicts with Shahu who used a Guerrilla warfare technique led by his Peshwa Baji Rao I, which resulted in the Battle of Palkhed in 1728 AD, Sambhaji II repudiate at the last moment and the Shahu forces surrounded the Nizam, he sign the treaty with Shahu which restored him as a Chhatrapati of Marathas and the right to collect levies in the Carnatic region.

1733 AD the Nizam and Baji Rao had made a compact to support each other in times of external attacks, in 1734 The Marathas attacked and captured Bundelkhand and Malwa from the Mughal control, and in exchange for these territories the Mughal emperor gave them the right to collect levies from Deccan, to which the nizam refused and the secret compact among both was broken. in 1737 AD when Maratha forces gathered in Delhi, Nizam marched against Maraths from Deccan to stop the invasion thus Marathas withdraw from Delhi and with the help of Nawab of Bhopal, they make a counterattack on Nizam's armies which resulted in the Battle of Bhopal, later in January 1738, a peace treaty was signed between both the parties and withdraw to their regions.

The Nizam divided his newly acquired kingdom into three parts. One-third became his private estate known as the Sarf-i-Khas, one-third was allotted for the expenses of the government and was known as Diwan's territory, and the remainder was distributed to nobles (Jagirdar, Zamindars, Deshmukh), who in return paid Mazars (gifts) to the Nizam for the privilege of collecting revenue from the villages under their suzerainty. The most important of these were the Paigah estates. The House of Paigah doubled up as generals, Nawab Abu'l Fateh Khan who served as general of the nizams, the paigah's making it easy to raise an army should the Nizams Dominions come under attack. They were the equivalent to the Barmakids for the Abbasid Caliphate. Only second to the Nizam's family.

==== War against the Marathas ====
The Nizam wrote some advice for his successors in the Ma'asir-i Nizami:

"It is necessary for the ruler of the Deccan who desires his safety, peace from war, and the prosperity of his country to have peace with the Marathas who are the landholders [zamindaran] of this region."

"The earth dried up, the clouds without dew, Alas! for the poor handful of grass."But Marathas never fight directly on the battlefield and always run around and fight from behind the mountains."

— Warid, written proverb describing Asaf Jah I and Samsam-ud-Daula's campaign against the Marathas in 1734

In 1725, the Marathas clashed with the Nizam, who refused to pay Chauth and Sardeshmukhi to the Marathas. The war began in August 1727 and ended in March 1728. Nizam signed a treaty named Treaty of Mungi-Shevgaon at Shevgaon near Nashik by Bajirao I, the son of Peshwa Balaji Vishwanath Bhatt.

==== Treaty with Maratha Empire ====
Anxious to divert Marathas away from his Deccan strongholds, and to save himself from the Mughal emperor of North India's hostile attempts to suppress his independence, The Nizam encouraged the Marathas to invade Malwa and the northern Indian territories of the Mughal empire. The Nizam says that he could use the Marathas to his advantage in the Maasir-i Nizami:

"I consider all this army (Marathas) as my own and I will get my work done through them. It is necessary to take our hands off Malwa. God willing, I will enter into an understanding with them and entrust the Mulukgiri(raiding) on that side of the Narmada to them."

== Nader Shah's invasion ==
In 1739, from beyond the Hindu Kush, Nader Shah started advancing towards Delhi through Afghanistan and the Punjab.

Nizam ul-Mulk sent his troops to Karnal, where Mughal emperor Muhammed Shah's forces had gathered to turn back the Persian army. Influenced by suspicions of the Hindustani party, Muhammad Shah refused to give command of the army to the Nizam, which was given instead to the commander-in-chief, Khan-i Dauran. The combined forces of Muhammad Shah and the Nizam were cannon fodder for the Persian cavalry and was defeated by Nader Shah's superior weaponry and tactics. The Nizam remained inert with a third of the army during the battle, likely hoping to take the places of his rivals at court. He watched the battle passively without participation, as he believed it was futile to wage war against such a formidable foe rather than save himself and his men. He told the messenger sent by Muhammad Shah:

"Whatever the king likes, he is free to speak and make orders, but he does not understand the art of warfare. The stupid fellows went to launch a campaign without order and discipline, and by their folly destroyed a force of 40,000...The king is angry with me for not carrying out his commands. The reality is they did not listen to my advice."

Nader Shah entered Delhi and stationed his troops there. Some locals of Delhi quarrelled and attacked his soldiers. After nine hundred of his soldiers were killed in a bazaar brawl, Nader Shah flew into a rage, drew out his sword from the scabbard and ordered a massacre. Muhammad Shah was unable to prevent Delhi from being destroyed. When Nader Shah ordered the massacre in Delhi, neither the helpless Mughal Emperor Muhammed Shah nor any of his Ministers dared to speak to Nader Shah and negotiate a truce. Asaf Jah came forward and risked his life by going to Nader Shah and asking him to end the bloodbath of the city. Legend has it that Asaf Jah said to Nader Shah:

"You have taken the lives of thousands of people of the city, if you still wish to continue the bloodshed, then bring those dead back to life and then kill them again, for there are none left to be killed."

These words had a tremendous impact on Nader Shah – he ended the massacre on condition and returned to Persia.

== Later life ==
The Nizam was well suited to rule his territory. The administration was under control. In March 1742, the British who were based in Fort St George in Madras sent a modest hamper to Nizam ul-mulk in recognition of his leadership of the most important of the Mughal successor states. Its contents included a gold throne, gold and silver threaded silk from Europe, two pairs of large painted-looking glasses, equipage for coffee cups, 163.75 yards of green and 73.5 yards of crimson velvet, brocades, Persian carpets, a gold ceremonial cloth, two Arab horses, half a dozen ornate rose-water bottles and 39.75 chests of rose water – enough to keep the Nizam and his entire Darbar fragrant for the rest of his reign. In return, the Nizam sent one horse, a piece of jewellery and a note warning the British that they had no right to mint their currency, to which they complied.

It was after Nizam ul-mulk's death that his son and grandson sought help from the British and French to win the throne. Just days before he died in 1748, Asaf Jah dictated his last will. The 17-clause document was a blueprint for governance and personal conduct that ranged from advice on how to keep the troops happy and well-fed to an apology for neglecting his wife. He then reminded his successors to remain subservient to the Mughal Emperor who had granted them their office and rank. He warned against declaring war unnecessarily, but if forced to do so to seek the help of elders and saints and follow the sayings and practices of the Prophet. Finally, he insisted to his sons that "you must not lend your ears to tittle-tattle of the backbiters and slanderers, nor suffer the riffraff to approach your presence."

== Legacy ==
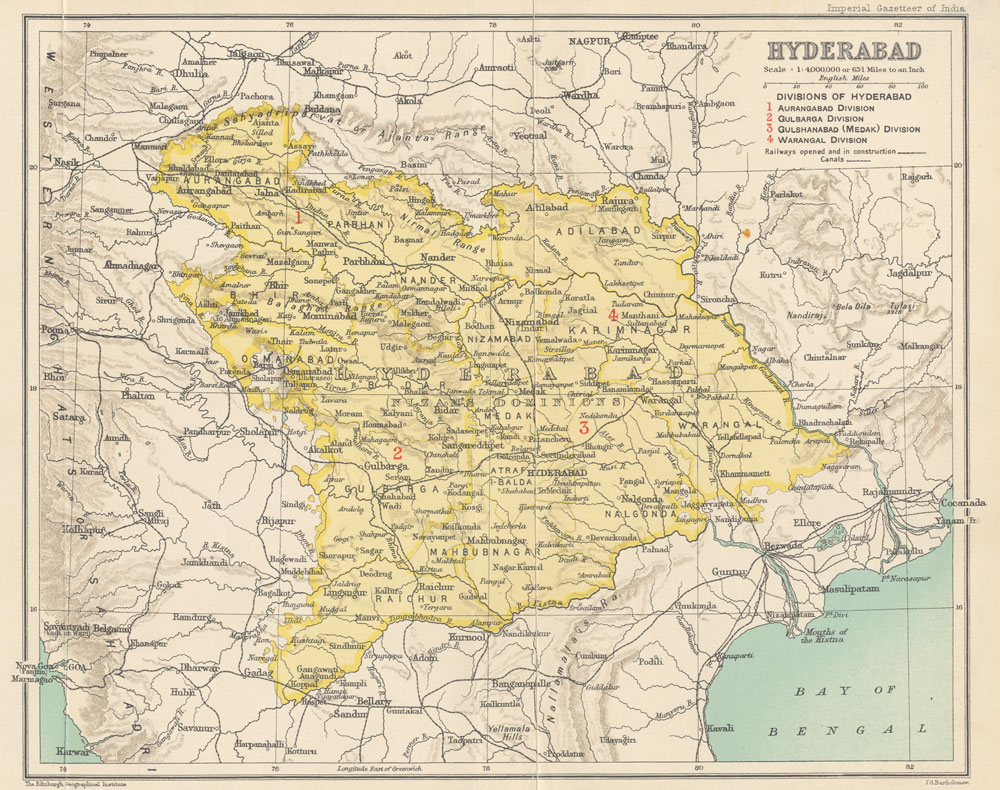
By the Reign of the seventh Nizam, his dominion was similar in size to Belgium, but it was a far cry from when the first Nizam had ruled over a territory the size of France.

Nizam-ul-Mulk is remembered as laying the foundation for what would become one of the most important Muslim states outside the Middle East by the first half of the twentieth century. Hyderabad State survived right through the period of British rule up to the time of Indian independence in 1947, and was indeed the largest – the state covered an extensive 95,337 sq. miles, an area larger than Mysore or Gwalior and the size of Nepal and Kashmir put together (although it was the size of France when the first Nizam held reign) – and one of the most prosperous, among the princely states of the British Raj. The titles of "Nizam Ul Mulk" and "Asaf Jah" that were bestowed on him by the Mughal Emperors, carried his legacy as his descendants ruled under the title of " Nizam of Hyderabad" and the dynasty itself came to be known as the Asaf Jahi Dynasty.

In early 1710, while being as Subedar of Awadh, he was very much disturbed by the Mughal Emperor court politics and crafty cliques present inside the court, that he resigned from Subedar of Awadh and left to live a life of Fakir.

== Personal life ==
Asaf Jah was married to Said-un-Nisa Begum, who belonged to a Sayed family from Gulbargah. From this marriage he had four children, two daughters; one of them being Khair-un-Nisa Begum, who was later married to Mutawassil Khan, grandson of Sa'adullah Khan and two sons; Feroz Jung and Nasir Jung (later nizam). From other wives he had four more sons; Salabat Jung (later Nizam), Nizam Ali Khan (later Nizam), Basalat Jung, and Mogal Ali Khan. He had two more daughters, Mukarrama Banu Begum also known as Kali Begum, who was married to Qiyam-ul-Mulk, the Qiladar of Bidar and Kalyani, and with whom she had a daughter, who married the son of Najm-ud-Daulah in 1766; and Khan Bahadur Begum, who died on 20 November 1788, and was buried in Makkah Masjid, Hyderabad.

As per the 1749 British records of Fort St. George, Nizam-ul-Mulk even thought about installing his favourite daughter Khair-un-Nisa Begum's son Muzaffar Jung when he was dissatisfied with the conduct of Nasir Jung. He gave up that idea due to possible serious repercussions and reconciled with Nasir Jung. He recommended bestowing the Circars of Adoni and Raichur to Muzaffar Jung with acceptance of the Padishah.

Nasir Jung being Nizam-ul-Mulk's son (i.e. have some claim to the Deccan Subah) and Muzaffar Jung being his favourite grandson lead the succession of one of the most important Subahs of Mughal empire into a severe crisis with was well exploited first by the French and then by British. After defeating Nasir Jung with the help of the French, Muzaffar Jung indeed became Nizam later, but for a very short period. Interestingly, Muzaffar Jung being favourite grandson of Asaf Jah I, was the only thing that hesitated Nasir Jung about executing him, when he was imprisoned during the Second Carnatic War. Unexpected sudden death of Muzaffar Jung lead his uncle Salabat Jung (i.e. younger brother of Nazir Jung) to be installed as the new Nizam who was deposed by his younger brother Nizam Ali Khan with the help of British and Marathas.

The succession feud between Nasir Jung and Muzaffar Jung was one of the most pivotal events in Indian history that led to the interference of European powers. This led to the emergence of Robert Clive and the ultimate domination of the British in the Indian peninsula in the later years. Irony was that Both Nasir Jung and Muzaffar Jung died due to the betrayal of Pathan Nawabs (i.e. Faujdars) of the circars of Kurnool, Kadapa and Savanur.

== Death ==
Due to continuous engagement in restoring internal conflicts and resolving increasing threats of neighbouring Marathas, he was engaged in an extensive tour of his domain. During this tour, in May 1748, he arrived in Burhanpur, he caught a cold and flu that deteriorated his health. Realizing death upon him, the Nizam dictated his last testament (wasiyyatnama), spanning 17 clauses in the presence of his available family members and close confidants. He died on 1 June 1748 aged 77 at Burhanpur and was buried at mazaar of Shaikh Burhan ud-din Gharib Chisti, Khuldabad, near Aurangabad, the place where Nizam's mentor Aurangazeb is also buried.

The death of Asaf Jah I in 1748 resulted in a period of political unrest as his sons and grandson—Nasir Jung (1748–1750), Muzaffar Jang (1750–1751) and Salabat Jung (1751–1762)—contended for the throne backed by opportunistic neighbouring states and colonial foreign forces. The accession of Asaf Jah II, who reigned from 1762 to 1803, ended the instability. In 1768 he signed the Treaty of Masulipatam, surrendering the coastal region to the East India Company in return for a fixed annual rent.

== Titles ==
- 1685: Khan
- 1691: Khan Bahadur
- 1697: Chin Qilich Khan (by Emperor Aurangazeb)
- 9 December 1707: Khan-i-Dauran Bahadur
- 1712: Ghazi ud-din Khan Bahadur and Firuz Jang
- 12 January 1713: Khan-i-Khanan, Nizam ul-Mulk and Fateh Jang (by Emperor Farrukhsiyar)
- 12 July 1737: Asaf Jah (by Emperor Muhammad Shah)
- 26 February 1739: Amir ul-Umara and Bakshi ul-Mamalik (Paymaster-General)
- Final: Chin Fateh Khan, Chin Qilich Khan, Nizam-ul-Mulk, Asaf Jah, Khan-i-Dauran Bahadur, Khan-i-Khana, Fateh Jung, Firuz Jang, Ghazi-ud-din Bahadur, Amir-ul-Umara, Bakhshi-ul-Mumalik

== In popular culture ==
- In the 2017 Hindi-language TV series Peshwa Bajirao, Yuri Suri portrays Qamr-ud-din Khan.
- In the 2015 Bollywood movie Bajirao Mastani, Raza Murad appears in a cameo as Asaf Jah I.

== Positions ==
- 1701–1705: Faujdar of the Carnatic and Talikota
- 1705–1706: Faujdar of the Bijapur, Azam Nagar and Belgaum
- 1706–1707: Faujdar of Raichur, Talikota, Sakhar and Badkal
- 1707: Faujdar of Firozabad and Balakot
- 9 December 1707 – 6 February 1711: Subedar of Oudh and Faujdar of Gorakhpur
- 12 January 1713 – April 1715: Subedar of the Deccan and Faujdar of the Carnatic
- April 1717-7 January 1719: Faujdar of Moradabad
- 7 February – 15 March 1719: Subedar of Patna
- 15 March 1719 – 1724: Subedar of Malwa
- 1722–1724: Subedar of Gujarat

== Military promotions ==
- Commander of 400-foot and 100 horse, 1684 (roughly equivalent to a modern battalion commander or lieutenant-colonel)
- 400-foot and 500-horse, 1691
- 400-foot and 900-horse, 1698
- 3,000-foot and 500 horse, 1698 (roughly equivalent to a modern regimental commander or colonel)
- 3,500-foot and 3,000 horse, 1698 (roughly equivalent to a modern brigade commander or brigadier)
- 4,000-foot and 3,000 horse, 1699,
- 4,000-foot and 3,600-horse, 1700
- 4,000-foot and 4,000 horse, 1702 (roughly equivalent to a modern division commander or major-general)
- 5,000-foot and 5,000 horse, 1705
- 6,000-foot and 6,000 horse, 9 December 1707
- 7,000-foot and 7,000 horse, 27 January 1708
- 8,000-foot and 8,000 horse, 12 January 1713
- 9,000-foot and 9,000 horse, 8 February 1722

Nizam-ul-Mulk, Asaf Jah I Asaf Jahi dynasty
Preceded by None	Nizam of Hyderabad; 1720 – 1 June 1748	Succeeded by Nasir Jang Mir Ahmad

== Bibliography ==
- Khan, Yousuf Hussain (1936). Nizamu'l-Mulk Asaf Jah I. Basel Mission Press.
- Mehta, Jaswant Lal (2005). Advanced study in the history of modern India 1707–1813. Sterling. ISBN 9781932705546.
- Faruqui, Munis D. (2013). "At Empire's End: The Nizam, Hyderabad and Eighteenth-century India". In Richard M. Eaton; Munis D. Faruqui; David Gilmartin; Sunil Kumar (eds.). Expanding Frontiers in South Asian and World History: Essays in Honour of John F. Richards. Cambridge University Press. pp. 1–38. ISBN 978-1-107-03428-0.
