= Jagirdari crisis =

Late-Mughal historiographical concept

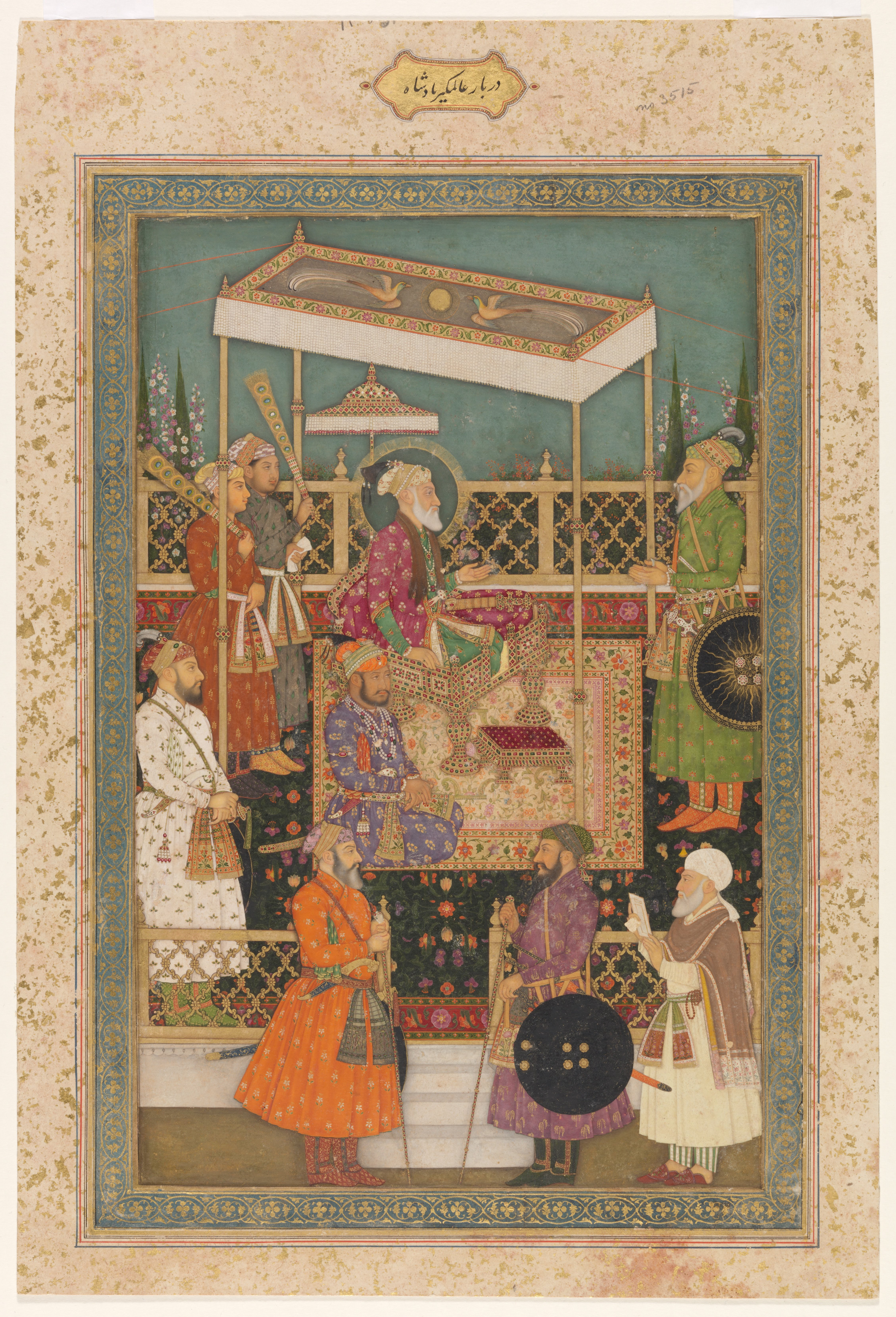
Aurangzeb receiving Prince Mu'azzam in court. By the late reign, the imperial service elite had expanded faster than available revenue.

The Jagirdari crisis (Persian: بحران جاگیرداری) is a historiographical category used to describe a chronic imbalance in the Mughal Empire's service-compensation system during the late seventeenth and early eighteenth centuries, in which the number of imperial rank-holders (mansabdars) and their aggregate salary claims outran the revenue of assignable land (jagirs). The term was coined by the Indian historian M. Athar Ali in his 1966 study The Mughal Nobility under Aurangzeb, and it has since framed much of the scholarly debate on the decline of the Mughal Empire. Although contemporary Mughal chroniclers such as Khafi Khan and Saqi Mustaid Khan recorded specific symptoms, terms such as bejagiri (an officer without a jagir) and the shrinking paibaqi (reserve of assignable land) were not assembled into a named crisis until late twentieth-century historiography.

The structural mechanism was that from the late reign of Shah Jahan and accelerating through that of Aurangzeb, the Mughal service elite expanded faster than the empire's realised revenue. The Deccan campaigns after 1681 incorporated Maratha, Deccani, and Afghan nobilities into the mansabdari, further inflating claims on a stock of revenue that was, in many provinces, contracting because of peasant flight, zamindar militarisation, and declining collections. Officers waited years for jagir assignments; when assignments came, they yielded only a fraction of the assessed jama. Factional politics, fiscal shortfall, and regional reconfiguration moved together in the decades around Aurangzeb's death in 1707.

Later historians have disputed both the scale and the causal weight of the crisis. Irfan Habib grounded the problem in a deeper agrarian crisis that made jagirdari shortfall a symptom rather than an independent cause. Satish Chandra emphasised factional politics at the imperial court. Karen Leonard argued that the withdrawal of indigenous banking credit from the Mughal state was more decisive than the jagir balance sheet. Muzaffar Alam contested the category itself, arguing that what looked like crisis in Delhi appeared as regional reconfiguration in Awadh and the Punjab. John F. Richards read these positions as overlapping rather than mutually exclusive.

In most modern narratives of Mughal decline, the jagirdari crisis occupies a central explanatory place: a structural flaw that converted military victory in the Deccan into fiscal exhaustion, underpinned the factional paralysis of the post-Aurangzeb succession, and shaped the regional polities that emerged in the half-century before the Battle of Plassey in 1757.

== Etymology and historiographical origin ==
The compound jagirdari derives from the Persian jāgīr (a revenue assignment) and the suffix -dārī (the holding of office), producing the abstract noun for "the office or system of holding a jagir". A jagirdar was a nobleman assigned the right to collect the state's share of land revenue from a specified tract in lieu of a cash salary, while retaining an obligation to maintain a set number of cavalrymen and horses at the emperor's disposal. The jagir was not land ownership; it was a revenue right, rotated periodically to prevent the formation of hereditary local power.

Contemporary administrative vocabulary included several related terms that recur in discussions of the crisis. Khalisa denoted crown lands whose revenue flowed directly to the imperial treasury rather than to assignees. Paibaqi designated the reserve of land revenue held aside for the assignment of future jagirs. Bejagiri described the condition of a mansabdar who, despite holding formal rank, had not yet been allotted a jagir and therefore received no income. Jama was the revenue assessed on a tract on paper, while hasil was the revenue actually realised; the gap between the two widened sharply after the middle of the seventeenth century.

The phrase "jagirdari crisis" itself is not a seventeenth-century Mughal term. It appears nowhere in the Ain-i-Akbari, in the Padshahnama, or in the chronicles of Aurangzeb's reign. It is a historiographical construct, introduced in 1966 by M. Athar Ali as a heading under which to organise a cluster of documented administrative complaints, salary reductions, and factional quarrels that he argued were evidence of a systemic rather than episodic failure. The concept was taken up by Habib, S. Nurul Hasan, Chandra, Alam, and others in successive decades, and has since stabilised as a named category in Aligarh-school and Cambridge-school accounts of Mughal decline.

== Background: the jagir and mansabdari system, c. 1580–1650 ==
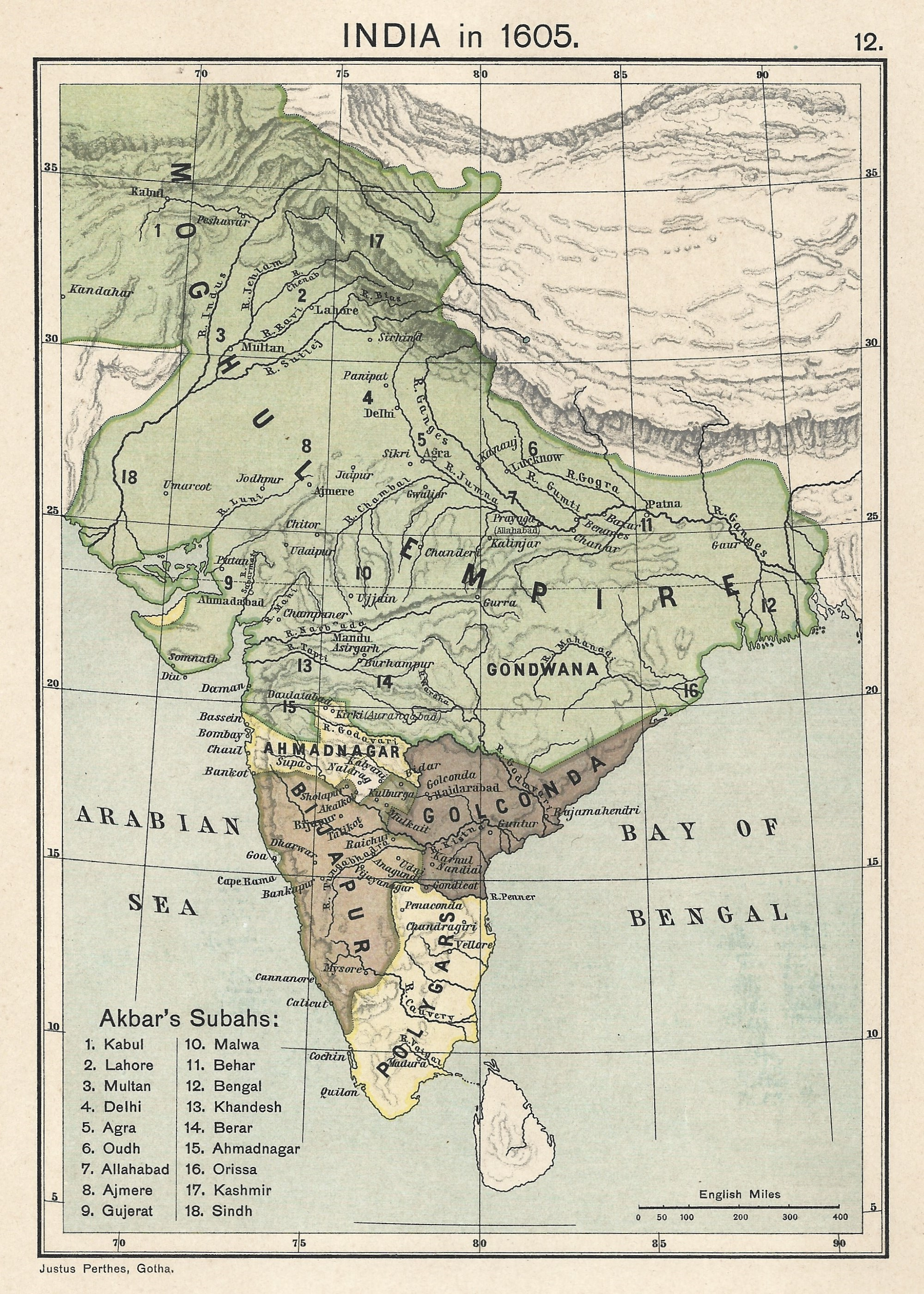
The Mughal Empire in 1605, showing the core subahs on which the mature jagir system rested.

The mature Mughal service system was codified under Akbar in the 1570s and 1580s. Military and civilian officers received dual numerical ranks, zat (personal rank, indicating status and salary) and sawar (cavalry rank, indicating the number of horsemen to be maintained). Salaries for the upper ranks were paid not in cash but through jagir assignments, which were rotated typically every three or four years between provinces to discourage entrenchment. Revenue assessments, codified for the northern core under the zabt system supervised by Raja Todar Mal, produced the jama figures that governed the nominal value of each assignment.

The system was stable so long as three conditions held: the mansab ranks were awarded sparingly, the jama remained close to the realised hasil, and a healthy paibaqi of unassigned revenue was available for the assignment of new officers and for the crown's khalisa. Under Akbar and Jahangir the balance generally held. The service elite remained small. Akbar's reign recorded under two thousand total mansabdars in administrative documentation; at the end of Jahangir's reign around 1628 the service elite was substantially expanded but still largely matched by available assignable revenue.

Under Shah Jahan the system began to register pressure. The twentieth year of his reign (1646) recorded some 8,000 mansabdars on the imperial rolls, a large expansion from Jahangir's day. Much of the growth was concentrated at the upper ranks, among mansabdars of 1,000 zat and above, who drew the largest salaries and required the largest jagirs. Shah Jahan simultaneously expanded the khalisa substantially to fund imperial construction projects, removing land from the paibaqi available for assignment. A gap between rank awards and realisable revenue began to widen before Aurangzeb's accession.

== Structural tensions under Shah Jahan and early Aurangzeb ==
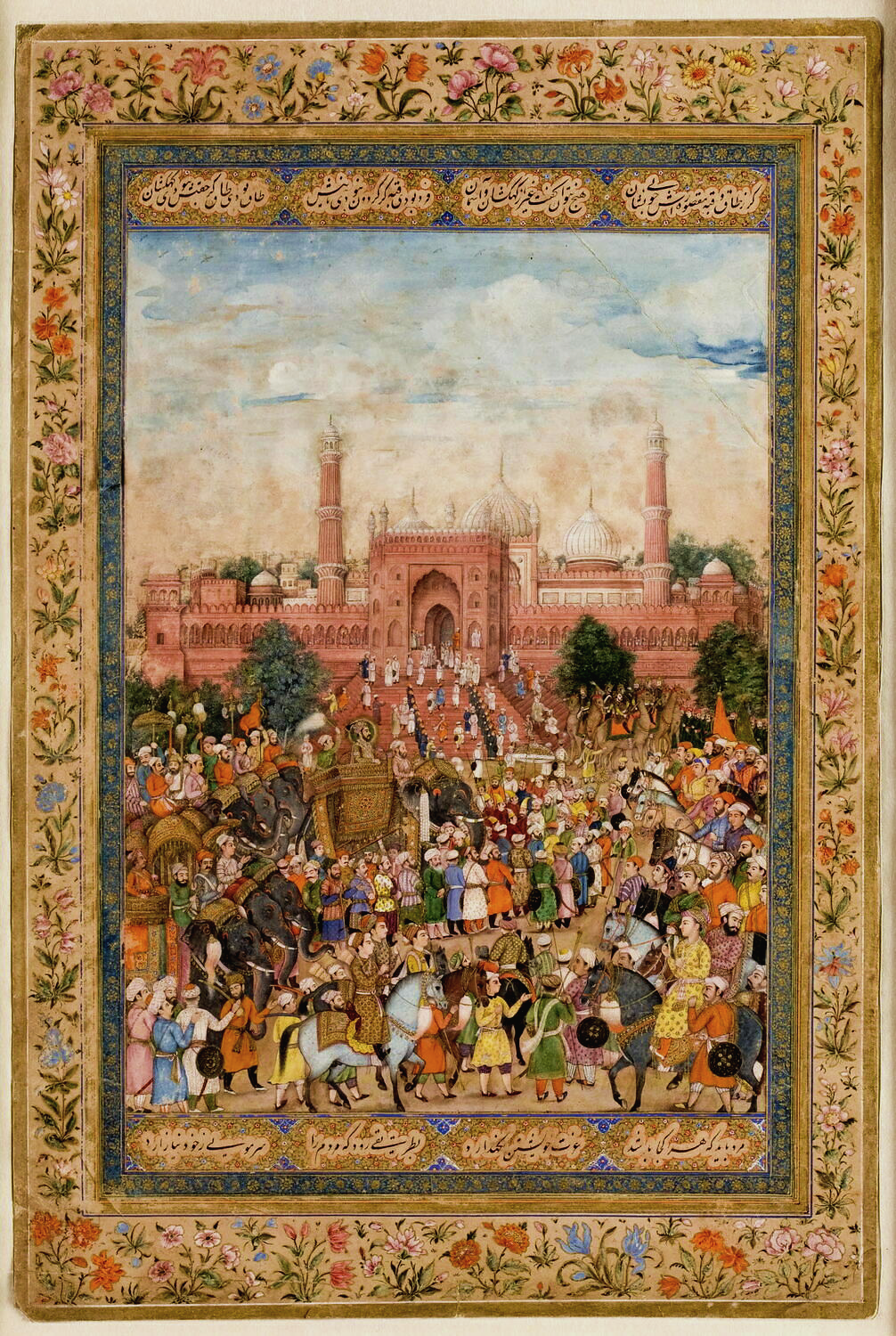
Emperor Farrukhsiyar (r. 1713–1719) in procession. Post-Aurangzeb emperors presided over a fiscally hollowed-out service system.

Administrative documents from the last two decades of Shah Jahan's reign show officers negotiating jagir transfers more frequently and with longer delays than a generation earlier. The first generation of scholars who examined this correspondence, notably Jadunath Sarkar and William Irvine in the early twentieth century, read the delays as ordinary bureaucratic friction rather than as signs of structural strain. Later quantitative work, especially Athar Ali's collation of the tazkiras and the Ma'asir-ul-Umara for The Apparatus of Empire, treated the same delays as early indications of a widening mismatch.

In the first two decades of Aurangzeb's reign (1658–1678), the number of mansabdars above the 1,000-zat threshold grew to 486. In the last three decades (1679–1707), the number rose to 575, an increase of 18 percent concentrated in the Deccan theatre. Habib's analysis of the provincial assessment figures shows that over the same period the realised hasil in the core northern provinces (Delhi, Agra, Allahabad, Malwa) was falling or stagnating in real terms. Two curves, rising rank inflation and flat or falling realised revenue, were converging by the 1680s.

Administrative responses in this period were ad hoc. The state periodically reduced the effective cash value of jagirs by applying a mah-i-muqarrara (fixed-month) rating, meaning that a jagir nominally assessed at twelve months' worth of revenue would be paid out at six or eight months' worth in practice. The practice institutionalised a discount between the formal and the realised salary, and, according to Habib, concealed rather than resolved the underlying mismatch.

== Crisis phase: the Deccan wars, c. 1680–1707 ==
The move to the Deccan after 1681, in pursuit of the Maratha and Bijapuri campaigns, is treated in most accounts as the moment at which underlying strain became acute crisis. The campaigns required sustained troop mobilisation over more than two decades, absorbed a substantial part of the imperial treasury, and drew new noble constituencies into the mansabdari.

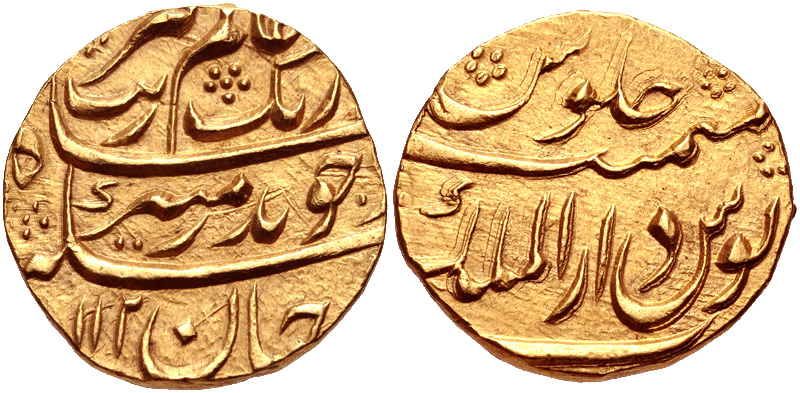
Coin of Aurangzeb minted at Kabul, 1691/2, during the Deccan wars.

Two features of the Deccan campaigns sharpened the crisis. First, Aurangzeb incorporated the surrendered Deccani nobility (Bijapuri and Golcondan officers) and large numbers of Maratha chiefs into the mansabdari at competitive ranks, often to secure their military cooperation or to buy off their resistance. Athar Ali calculated that the share of Deccanis and Marathas in the upper nobility rose from a negligible fraction in 1658 to roughly a quarter by 1707. Second, the revenue base of the southern acquisitions was unstable. Much of the putative jama of Bijapur and Golconda after their conquest could not be realised because the countryside was contested by Marathas, zamindars were militarised, and collection rights were frequently disputed.

The number of mansabdars became so large that there were complaints that no jagirs were left for being granted to them. The Emperor and his ministers repeatedly contemplated the stoppage of all fresh recruitment, but the force of circumstances prevented them from giving effect to this decision.

— M. Athar Ali, summarising the administrative archive of Aurangzeb's late reign

The consequence, as recorded in the Ma'asir-i-'Alamgiri and noted in Athar Ali's reading of the archival record, was that the number of mansabdars became so large that there were complaints that no jagirs were left for being granted to them. The emperor and his ministers repeatedly contemplated the stoppage of all fresh recruitment, but the force of circumstances prevented them from giving effect to this decision.

Officers newly assigned to Deccan jagirs often spent months or years pursuing collection through deputies, frequently extracting only a fraction of the nominal revenue. Many requested transfer back to the imperial core, where claims exceeded the shrinking paibaqi. The paibaqi itself contracted through the 1690s: Habib documented province-by-province reductions in the reserve, while the jama of Aurangzeb's official registers continued to record large nominal figures that the hasil did not reach.

== Mechanics and symptoms ==
Three linked administrative developments define the crisis in operational terms. First, bejagiri became a recurrent complaint in the last decades of Aurangzeb's reign. A mansabdar without a jagir drew no income and could not maintain his sanctioned cavalry contingent, which in turn threatened military readiness. Second, the mah-i-muqarrara (month-scale) rating of jagirs became more severe. What had been a discount of two to three months' worth of revenue under Shah Jahan became, in some provinces, a discount of four to six months' worth; a jagir of nominal jama of 400,000 dams might pay 200,000 or less in realisable revenue. Third, jagir transfers accelerated. Officers were moved from one assignment to another more frequently, reducing the period available to establish effective collection networks and producing the predatory rotation that Habib described as a "permanent transfer economy".

These fiscal strains are inseparable in the historiography from the factional politics of the Aurangzeb court. Satish Chandra's reading of the late-Aurangzeb and early-eighteenth-century archive organised the senior nobility into four ethnic and ideological blocs: Turani (central Asian Turkic), Irani (Shia Persian), Deccanis, and Hindustanis (Indian-born Muslim and Rajput). Each bloc was bound together by shared origin, shared patronage networks, and increasingly by shared claims on particular provincial revenues. Chandra argued that as available revenue contracted, competition between blocs intensified, and the conflicts that surfaced in the succession struggles of 1707–1720 were rooted in the jagirdari squeeze of the preceding decades.

At the level of revenue mechanics, the crisis was also visible in the enlarged role of administrative intermediaries. Alam, writing of the Awadh and Punjab provinces, observed that the difference between the jama and the hasil had a close bearing on the jagirdars' ability or inability to mobilise strength, and that the jagirdars' military power had declined following the reforms in the mansab and jagir systems of the seventeenth century. The emperor's orders for assignment of jagirs and mansabs had, in many provinces, become ineffective by the last decades of Aurangzeb's reign.

== Table of mansabdar expansion ==
The following table collates Athar Ali's canonical counts of mansabdars of 1,000 zat and above, which are the best-documented quantitative series for the crisis:

Mansabdars of 1,000 zat and above, 1595–1707
Period	Reign	Mansabdars (1,000 zat+)	Notes
c. 1595	Akbar	c. 1,823 (total; ~98 at 1,000+)	Ain-i-Akbari reckoning; Moosvi's reconstruction
c. 1628	Jahangir (end of reign)	c. 200 at 1,000+	Expansion during Mewar and Deccan campaigns
c. 1646	Shah Jahan (20th regnal year)	c. 8,000 total; ~300–400 at 1,000+	Includes expanded lower and middle ranks
1658–1678	Aurangzeb (1st half)	486 at 1,000+	Athar Ali count
1679–1707	Aurangzeb (2nd half)	575 at 1,000+	18% increase concentrated in Deccan theatre

== Post-1707 continuities and regional variation ==
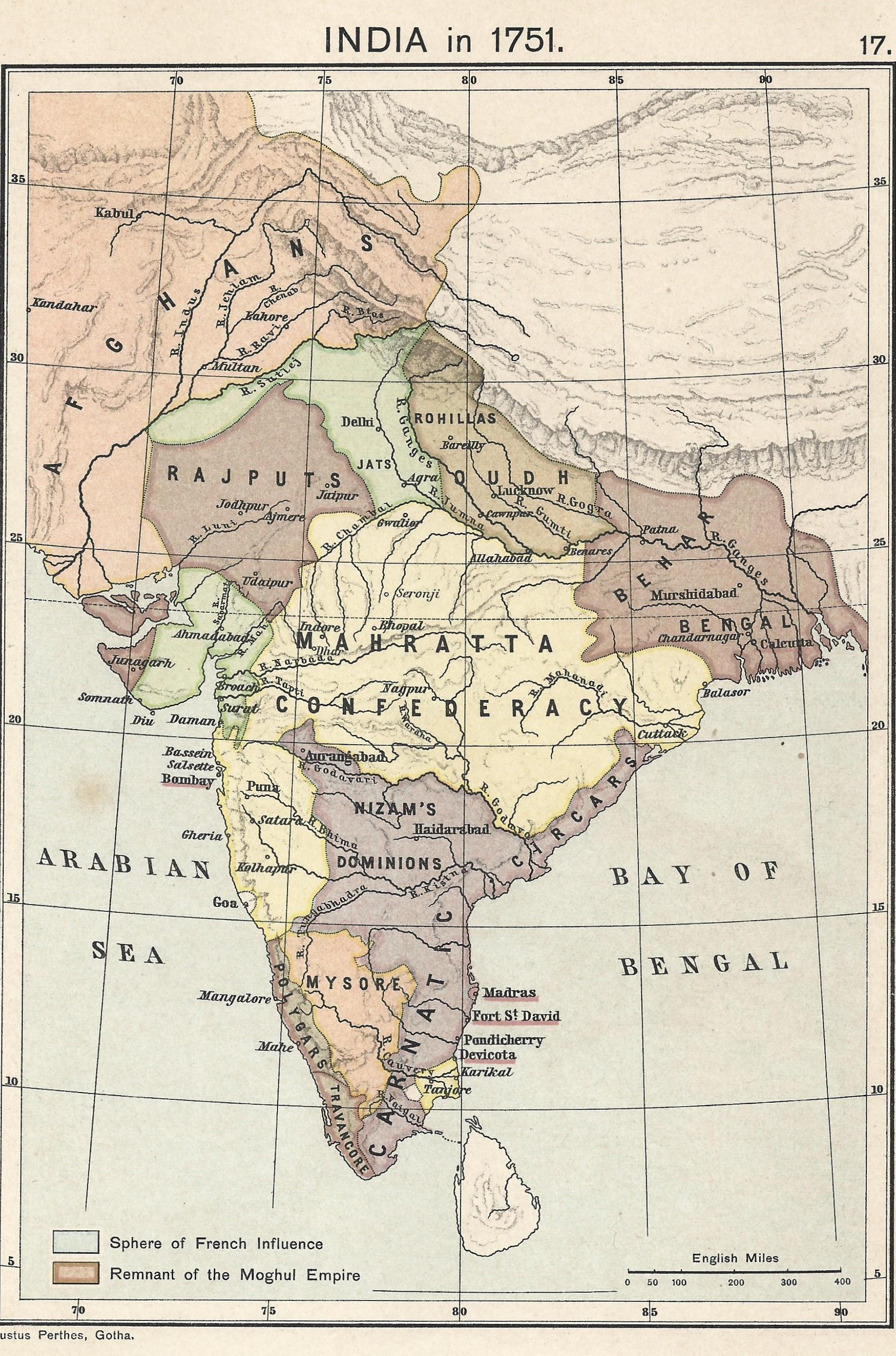
The reduced Mughal realm in 1751, after four decades of jagirdari and factional crisis.

Aurangzeb's death in March 1707 opened a contested succession between his sons Muhammad Azam Shah, Shah Alam (Bahadur Shah I), and Muhammad Kam Bakhsh, resolved militarily at the Battle of Jajau in June 1707 and consolidated only after further succession conflict through 1709. The crisis did not resolve with the transition. Bahadur Shah I, who reigned until 1712, continued to face unfillable demands for jagir assignments and an inherited fiscal shortfall. His short successors, Jahandar Shah (1712–1713) and Farrukhsiyar (1713–1719), relied increasingly on the Sayyid Brothers and other factional patrons for political survival, a dynamic Chandra placed at the centre of post-Aurangzeb political instability.

Muzaffar Alam's 1986 study of Awadh and the Punjab argued that the crisis, viewed from the core, looked different from the regions. In Awadh, the governor was able to mobilise local social groups around his own banner and place nawabi rule on firm ground; in the Punjab, the new subadari collapsed and there was total chaos. Alam's broader thesis was that the economic developments in these provinces resulted in not only a rise in the revenue figures but also in the emergence and affluence of a number of towns. What registered at Delhi as fiscal collapse was, in the regions, the preconditions for the successor polities (nawabi Awadh, Hyderabad under Nizam-ul-Mulk, the Mysore of the Wodeyar-Tipu line).

In the core, the pattern was different. The paibaqi of the Delhi and Agra heartland continued to shrink into the 1720s and 1730s, and the factional rivalries intensified. The Marathas, the Jats, the Sikhs, and the Rajputs contested revenue rights on shrinking imperial territory. The sack of Delhi by Nadir Shah in 1739, which removed perhaps 700 million rupees' worth of treasure and destroyed the remaining fiscal reserves of the imperial state, is usually read as the point at which the crisis passed from chronic strain into terminal collapse.

== Historiography ==
The jagirdari crisis has been argued about continuously since Athar Ali's 1966 formulation. The debate has, in practice, been about which mechanism or combination of mechanisms most compactly explains the political and fiscal unravelling of the empire after Aurangzeb, and in particular whether the crisis is an independent category of explanation or a symptom of another cause.

=== Athar Ali (1966) and the nobility-centred thesis ===
Athar Ali, writing at Aligarh Muslim University in the first generation of the Aligarh school, argued in The Mughal Nobility under Aurangzeb that the structural pressure was best understood through the expansion of the service elite relative to available paibaqi. He read the archival record of complaints, jagir transfers, and petitions as evidence of a widening mismatch that the state could neither suspend nor absorb. Under his framework the Deccan wars were both a symptom and an intensifier: they drew new entrants into the mansabdari, imposed new claims on an unstable revenue base, and locked the empire into a self-reproducing squeeze. Later quantitative work (The Apparatus of Empire, 1985) systematised the mansab-roll evidence.

=== Irfan Habib (1963, revised 1999, 2013) and the agrarian framework ===
Irfan Habib's The Agrarian System of Mughal India 1556–1707, first published in 1963 and substantially revised in the second (1999) and third (2013) editions, framed the jagirdari squeeze as downstream of a deeper agrarian crisis. Habib located the primary cause in the extraction rate applied to cultivators, which he considered too high to be sustainable over time. High revenue demands produced peasant flight, zamindar militarisation, and cultivated-land contraction. These produced the realised-revenue shortfall that, for the jagirdars, registered as crisis of assignment. On Habib's account, the naming "jagirdari crisis" captured the tip of a deeper structural failure of the extractive relationship between state, zamindar, and peasant.

Habib's framework was not presented in direct opposition to Athar Ali; the two Aligarh scholars collaborated closely and treated their analyses as complementary. In practice, however, historians reading the two works side by side have drawn different inferences about which cause has priority.

=== Satish Chandra (1959) and factional politics ===
Satish Chandra's Parties and Politics at the Mughal Court, 1707–1740, first published in 1959 and expanded across several editions, centred the post-Aurangzeb collapse on factional competition among the four major noble blocs. Chandra read the jagirdari squeeze as the material substrate for faction competition: as available salaries shrank, and as the emperor's ability to redistribute patronage diminished, existing ethnic and ideological cleavages hardened into organised parties that fought for shrinking spoils. In his framing, the non-functionality of the jagirdari system was both cause and consequence of the factional deadlock.

=== Karen Leonard (1979) and the Great Firm theory ===
Karen Leonard, writing in Comparative Studies in Society and History in 1979, proposed an alternative explanation that shifted attention from the nobility to the mercantile and banking sector. Leonard argued that the empire had become dependent on the credit networks of the great Indian banking houses (sahukars, shroffs, and large firms such as the Jagat Seths) for short-term liquidity, revenue advances, and currency conversion. When these firms began to transfer their creditor relationships from the Mughal centre to emerging regional powers and to the East India Company, the empire lost the fiscal intermediation on which even its formal revenue was dependent. Leonard's thesis relocated the causal weight from the paibaqi balance to the credit market, and it framed the jagirdari crisis as a fiscal symptom of credit withdrawal.

Richards contested Leonard's chronology, arguing that the empire remained fiscally healthy and politically strong well into the 1690s, and that the banking houses reallocated their credit only after the crisis was already visible on the noble side of the ledger.

=== Muzaffar Alam (1986) and regional variation ===
Muzaffar Alam's The Crisis of Empire in Mughal North India: Awadh and the Punjab, 1707–48 contested the view of a uniform imperial collapse. Alam argued that what looked like decline at Delhi looked like reconfiguration in some of the regions. In Awadh, the subadari consolidated under Sa'adat Khan and his successors built durable nawabi rule on expanding local fiscal arrangements; in the Punjab, by contrast, the subadari fragmented under Sikh and zamindar pressure. Central to Alam's reading is that the crisis of the jagirdari system was not a simple shortage of land but its non-functionality: the imperial order for assignment had become ineffective, while the realised revenue was increasingly captured by intermediary zamindars, village and qasba-based madad-i ma'ash holders, and a very large number of lower-level officials.

Alam accepted Habib's agrarian framework as a condition but rejected the view that the Mughal system was uniformly collapsing. His regional-variation argument has since been extended by other scholars to Bengal, to the Carnatic, and to the Deccan of the Hyderabad and Maratha successors.

=== John F. Richards (1993) and the Cambridge synthesis ===
J. F. Richards's volume on the Mughal Empire in the New Cambridge History of India (1993) presented a synthetic account that treated the agrarian crisis, the jagirdari crisis, and the factional-political crisis as interlinked rather than stacked causes of decline. Richards accepted the core of Athar Ali's nobility-centred analysis, endorsed Habib's extractive-rate reading as one of its preconditions, drew on Chandra for the factional dynamics, and incorporated Alam's regional variation as the explanation for the uneven transition into successor polities. In Richards's framing, the Mughal case belongs, with qualifications, to the wider "seventeenth-century crisis" debate in early-modern historiography, though the timing in South Asia runs a half-century later than in Europe and China.

=== Other interventions ===
Stephen Blake's urban-administrative study Shahjahanabad: The Sovereign City in Mughal India, 1639–1739 traced the crisis through the physical city of Delhi, the imperial household's patronage, and the city-state logic of the Mughal capital. Andrea Hintze's The Mughal Empire and Its Decline (1997) attempted an interpretation of the sources of social power during the late seventeenth and early eighteenth centuries, integrating the Aligarh-school and Cambridge-school positions under a Michael Mann-style framework. Shireen Moosvi's The Economy of the Mughal Empire, c. 1595 (1987) provided the statistical baseline of the late-sixteenth-century empire against which the eighteenth-century shortfall can be measured.

=== Summary table of positions ===
Principal historiographical positions on the Jagirdari crisis
Scholar	Year	Core argument
M. Athar Ali	1966	Rank expansion outran the paibaqi; the nobility itself is the locus of the crisis
Irfan Habib	1963 (1999, 2013)	Agrarian extraction-rate crisis is primary; jagirdari shortfall is a downstream symptom
Satish Chandra	1959	Factional competition among noble blocs drives the post-1707 collapse; jagirdari non-functionality is both cause and effect
Karen Leonard	1979	Withdrawal of Indian banking credit (the "Great Firm" thesis) is the primary cause
Muzaffar Alam	1986	The crisis is regional and variegated; non-functionality rather than shortage; successor polities rise from the same conditions
John F. Richards	1993	Synthetic: agrarian, jagirdari, and factional crises are interlocking rather than competing
Stephen Blake	1991	Urban / patrimonial-bureaucratic reading of the imperial household
Andrea Hintze	1997	Integrative social-power framework
Shireen Moosvi	1987	Statistical baseline of c. 1595 economy

== Legacy in Mughal decline literature ==
The jagirdari crisis continues to occupy a central place in the scholarly literature on Mughal decline. It is the point at which the institutional strengths of the mature empire (a large paid service elite, a codified revenue assessment, a rotating jagir system that discouraged localism) became reciprocal weaknesses once the system of compensation could no longer be met. Accounts of the transition to the Mughal successor states routinely invoke the category, and it supplies the causal hinge between the military-administrative apparatus of Akbar and Shah Jahan and the regional politics of Hyderabad, Awadh, Bengal, the Maratha peshwas, and the Punjab after 1748.

The concept has also influenced comparative early-modern historiography. Richards's 1990 essay in Modern Asian Studies situated the Mughal case in the wider "seventeenth-century crisis" debate, while scholars of the Ottoman timar system and of Safavid Iran have used the Mughal jagirdari crisis as a comparative reference. The term is standard in postgraduate curricula on Mughal India in Indian, British, and American universities, and appears in Indian civil-service examination syllabi as a named concept.

== See also ==
- Mughal Empire
- Mughal fiscal system
- Decline of the Mughal Empire
- Jagir
- Mansabdar
- Zabt
- Irfan Habib
- M. Athar Ali
- General Crisis

== Sources ==
Modern scholarship

- Alam, Muzaffar (1986). The Crisis of Empire in Mughal North India: Awadh and Punjab, 1707–48. Delhi: Oxford University Press. OCLC 14068225.
- Ali, M. Athar (1968) [1966]. The Mughal Nobility under Aurangzeb (revised ed.). Bombay: Asia Publishing House.
- Ali, M. Athar (1985). The Apparatus of Empire: Awards of Ranks, Offices and Titles to the Mughal Nobility, 1574–1658. Delhi: Oxford University Press. ISBN 978-0-19-561500-5.
- Blake, Stephen P. (1991). Shahjahanabad: The Sovereign City in Mughal India, 1639–1739. Cambridge: Cambridge University Press. ISBN 978-0-521-39045-3.
- Chandra, Satish (2002) [1959]. Parties and Politics at the Mughal Court, 1707–1740 (4th ed.). New Delhi: Oxford University Press. ISBN 978-0-19-565444-8.
- Habib, Irfan (2013) [1963]. The Agrarian System of Mughal India 1556–1707 (3rd ed.). New Delhi: Oxford University Press. ISBN 978-0-19-807742-8.
- Hintze, Andrea (1997). The Mughal Empire and Its Decline: An Interpretation of the Sources of Social Power. Aldershot: Ashgate. ISBN 978-0-86078-611-5.
- Leonard, Karen (1979). "The 'Great Firm' Theory of the Decline of the Mughal Empire" (PDF). Comparative Studies in Society and History. 21 (2): 151–167. doi:10.1017/S0010417500012792. JSTOR 178445.
- Moosvi, Shireen (1987). The Economy of the Mughal Empire, c. 1595: A Statistical Study. Delhi: Oxford University Press. ISBN 978-0-19-561765-8.
- Richards, John F. (1990). "The Seventeenth-Century Crisis in South Asia". Modern Asian Studies. 24 (4): 625–638. doi:10.1017/S0026749X00010611. JSTOR 312759.
- Richards, John F. (1993). The Mughal Empire. The New Cambridge History of India, I.5. Cambridge: Cambridge University Press. ISBN 978-0-521-56603-2.

Primary sources

- Abu'l-Fazl 'Allami (1873–1894). The Ain-i-Akbari. Translated by Blochmann, Henry; Jarrett, Henry Sullivan. Calcutta: Asiatic Society of Bengal.
- Irvine, William (1922). Sarkar, Jadunath (ed.). Later Mughals. Calcutta: M. C. Sarkar.
- Khafi Khan, Muhammad Hashim (1877). Muntakhabu-l Lubab. Translated by Elliot, Henry Miers; Dowson, John.
- Saqi Mustaid Khan (1947). Ma'asir-i-'Alamgiri. Translated by Sarkar, Jadunath. Calcutta: Royal Asiatic Society of Bengal.
- Sarkar, Jadunath (1924). History of Aurangzib. Vol. 1–5. Calcutta: M. C. Sarkar.
