= Agrarian crisis of the Mughal Empire =

Historiographical concept of late-Mughal extractive breakdown advanced by Irfan Habib

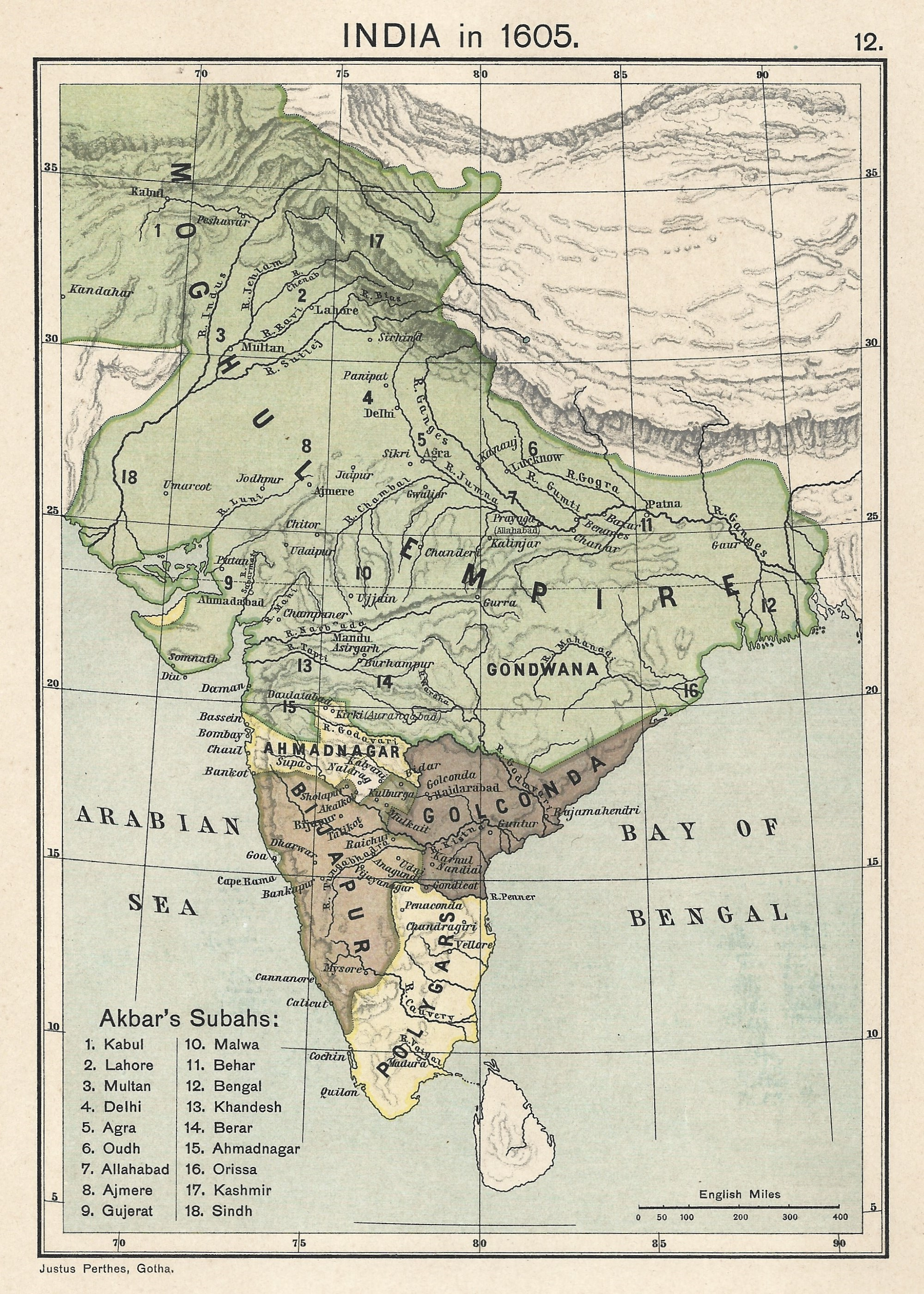
- The Mughal Empire's core provinces in 1605, on which the zabt-assessed revenue system rested.

Historiographical category
- First formulated: 1963, in The Agrarian System of Mughal India 1556–1707 by Irfan Habib
- Time period referenced: c. 1680–1739 (chronic); to 1761 (terminal)
- Principal archive: Imperial farmans; Rajasthan State Archives, Bikaner
- Central concepts: jama, hasil, paibaqi, khalisa, zamindar, jagir
- Related crises: Jagirdari crisis; factional politics of 1707–1740; seventeenth-century crisis
- Key proponents: Irfan Habib; M. Athar Ali; Satish Chandra; Shireen Moosvi
- Principal critics and revisers: Muzaffar Alam; C. A. Bayly; Sanjay Subrahmanyam; Frank Perlin; J. F. Richards

The agrarian crisis of the Mughal Empire is a historiographical category used to describe a chronic breakdown in the empire's extractive relationship with its peasant and zamindar classes from the later seventeenth century into the mid-eighteenth. The category was introduced by the Indian historian Irfan Habib in his 1963 study The Agrarian System of Mughal India 1556–1707 and has since framed much of the scholarly debate on the decline of the Mughal Empire. Habib argued that the combined weight of a high formal revenue demand, an unsustainable rent-squeeze on the peasantry, and the state's own system of rotating jagirs produced peasant flight, zamindar militarisation, and a widening gap between the revenue assessed on paper (jama) and the revenue actually realised (hasil). In Habib's reading, these pressures in the countryside underlay the administrative and fiscal unravelling that contemporaries experienced as the jagirdari crisis and that later historians have described as the Mughal decline.

The crisis, in this framing, did not begin with a single rupture. Its evidence is cumulative: contemporary petitions and imperial farmans from the last decades of Aurangzeb's reign record widespread peasant abandonment of cultivation, armed zamindar rebellions across the Doab, the Punjab, Malwa, Gujarat, and Rajputana, and falling or stagnant real revenue in the imperial core. The revolts of the Jats around Mathura from 1669, the Satnami uprising of 1672 in Narnaul, the Sikh revolts in the Punjab after 1675, and the chronic Maratha contest for the Deccan revenues after 1680 all feature in Habib's account as surface expressions of a single underlying strain on the land-revenue relationship.

Habib's framework has been contested and refined rather than replaced. Muzaffar Alam, in his 1986 study of Awadh and the Punjab, argued that what registered in Delhi as terminal imperial crisis appeared in the regions as a reconfiguration of fiscal and political authority rather than straightforward collapse. C. A. Bayly, Sanjay Subrahmanyam, Frank Perlin and others associated with the revisionist or "long eighteenth century" school argued that eighteenth-century regional economies were far more dynamic than Habib's account allowed, and that the collapse of imperial extraction did not translate into general economic crisis at the regional level. John F. Richards, writing in the New Cambridge History of India in 1993, presented a synthetic reading in which Habib's agrarian crisis, Athar Ali's jagirdari crisis, Satish Chandra's factional politics, and Karen Leonard's banking-credit thesis were read as overlapping rather than competing accounts of the same late-imperial unravelling.

The category occupies a central explanatory place in modern accounts of the political succession to the empire. It supplies the causal link between the institutional maturity of Akbar's and Shah Jahan's revenue state and the fragmentation of the half-century before the Battle of Plassey in 1757, and it continues to frame undergraduate and postgraduate teaching of Mughal decline in Indian, British, and American universities.

== Etymology and name ==
The phrase "agrarian crisis" is a twentieth-century coinage assembled from two English terms. "Agrarian" (from the Latin ager, "field") had been used in British colonial administrative prose from the early nineteenth century to denote matters relating to the cultivation of the soil, the revenue settlements that rested on it, and the peasant population it supported. "Crisis" (from the Greek krisis, "decision" or "turning point") entered early-modern European economic vocabulary through medical and political analogies, and became a standard category in the historiography of pre-industrial states during the mid-twentieth century general-crisis debate associated with Eric Hobsbawm, Hugh Trevor-Roper, and others.

Habib's application of the compound to the seventeenth-century Mughal countryside was deliberate. In the preface to the first edition of The Agrarian System of Mughal India 1556–1707, he explained that the category was chosen to describe a condition that was neither a single catastrophic rupture nor a slow secular decline but a chronic structural strain registering simultaneously at multiple points in the revenue relationship. The category was intended, Habib wrote, to be analytically distinct from the contemporary Persian vocabulary of administrative difficulty, even as it drew its evidentiary base from that vocabulary.

Alternate phrasings appear in the literature. "The crisis in the zabt system", "the agrarian breakdown", and "the Mughal agrarian depression" all appear in individual studies. "Agrarian crisis", however, became the dominant usage after the 1963 publication of Habib's book, and has remained the standard term in English-language scholarship. In Hindi and Urdu translations of the secondary literature, the phrase is typically rendered as krishi sankat or zirāʿī bohrān respectively, both calques of the English term rather than revivals of older Persian administrative usage.

== Concept and terminology ==
Habib's phrase "agrarian crisis" denotes a historiographical category rather than a technical term drawn from Mughal administrative Persian. It appears nowhere in the Ain-i-Akbari, in the Padshahnama, or in the seventeenth-century chronicles of Aurangzeb's reign, although the phenomena to which it refers are abundantly recorded in them under other vocabularies. Contemporary Mughal administrative prose described desertion of villages (uftada), the abandonment of cultivation (banjar), the flight of cultivators (parakanda), and the armed resistance of zamindars through specific procedural terms; Habib assembled these into a single analytical category in the twentieth century.

The concept rests on a specific relationship between four administrative values. The jama was the revenue assessed on a tract on paper, usually in silver dams on the basis of zabt (measured and rated) assessments devised under Akbar. The hasil was the revenue actually realised. The paibaqi was the reserve of assessed revenue retained by the state for the future assignment of jagirs to serving officers. The khalisa was the share of revenue held back for the imperial treasury. Crisis, in Habib's reading, was registered simultaneously in three of these categories: the gap between jama and hasil widened sharply from the middle of the seventeenth century, the paibaqi contracted, and the khalisa was expanded in the 1630s and 1640s in ways that deepened the structural shortfall.

At the level of the cultivator, the crisis was registered in two further categories. The ra'iyati (peasant) settlement retained land rights through customary use and heritable occupation, but the revenue demand imposed on the ra'iyati holder was set by imperial schedules that did not adjust well to local crop failure or political disturbance. The zamindar, an intermediary between state and peasant possessing hereditary revenue rights over a tract, was expected to collect the state's share and remit it upward. When revenue demands exceeded what the land could yield, or when the collection burden fell disproportionately on a particular region, the zamindar had the choice of absorbing the shortfall, transferring the burden to the ra'iyati, or resisting the imperial claim in arms. Habib argued that by the late seventeenth century, the third option was increasingly pursued.

== Historiographical origin ==
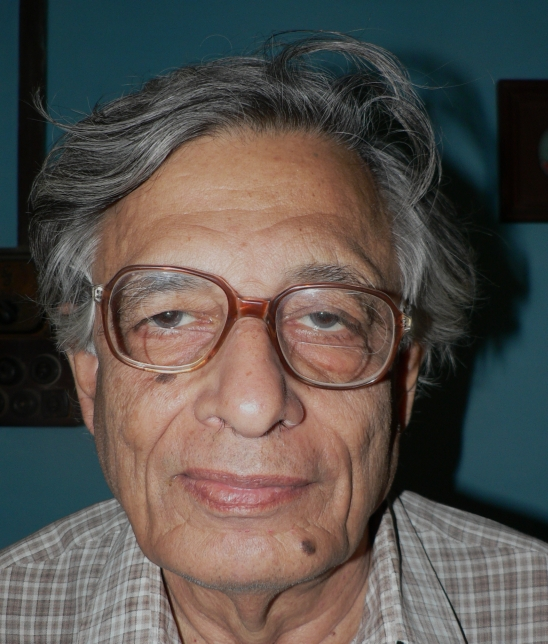
Irfan Habib, the originator of the agrarian-crisis category, photographed in 2007.

The category was introduced in Habib's The Agrarian System of Mughal India 1556–1707, completed as a doctoral thesis at Oxford and published by the Asia Publishing House in 1963. The book appeared in a substantially revised second edition from Oxford University Press in 1999 and a further revised third edition in 2013; Chapter 9, titled "The Agrarian Crisis", carried the same title across all three editions and supplied the category its canonical formulation.

Habib's thesis drew on three groups of sources that earlier scholarship had treated separately. The first was the administrative manual tradition represented by the Ain-i-Akbari of Abu'l-Fazl, with its zabt schedules, provincial revenue totals, and enumeration of castes and communities. The second was the seventeenth-century chronicle literature: the Padshahnama of Abdul Hamid Lahori, the Ma'asir-i-'Alamgiri of Saqi Mustaid Khan, and the Muntakhabu-l Lubab of Khafi Khan, read for references to rural disturbance, revenue arrears, and imperial coercion. The third was the imperial documentary record in Persian: the farmans, nishans, and revenue assessments preserved in the National Archives of India, the Rajasthan State Archives at Bikaner, and the collections of Aligarh Muslim University. Habib's innovation lay in triangulating across the three groups to produce a quantitative and regional account of the seventeenth-century countryside.

Later historiography has accepted the broad evidentiary base while differing on its interpretation. M. Athar Ali, writing in 1966, extended the analytical frame to the service nobility (mansabdars) to produce the related but distinct jagirdari crisis category. Satish Chandra, writing in the same generation, placed factional politics at the centre of the post-Aurangzeb collapse while treating Habib's agrarian pressure as one of its preconditions. Revisionist critics from the 1980s challenged the universality of Habib's collapse thesis without dislodging its core evidentiary claims.

Habib's book was reissued in a substantially revised second edition by Oxford University Press in 1999 and a further revised third edition in 2013; the 2013 edition added new chapters on monetary and technological history while leaving the "Agrarian Crisis" chapter structurally unchanged. Translation followed: a Hindi edition, Mughal Kalin Bharat Ki Krishi Vyavastha, appeared from Rajkamal Prakashan, and portions of the analysis were translated into Urdu and Bengali for teaching use. The book became standard reading in Indian university programmes in medieval history, in South Asian studies programmes in British and American universities, and in the comparative early-modern history graduate syllabi in which the Mughal case features alongside the Ming and Ottoman.

== Mughal revenue system, c. 1560–1650 ==
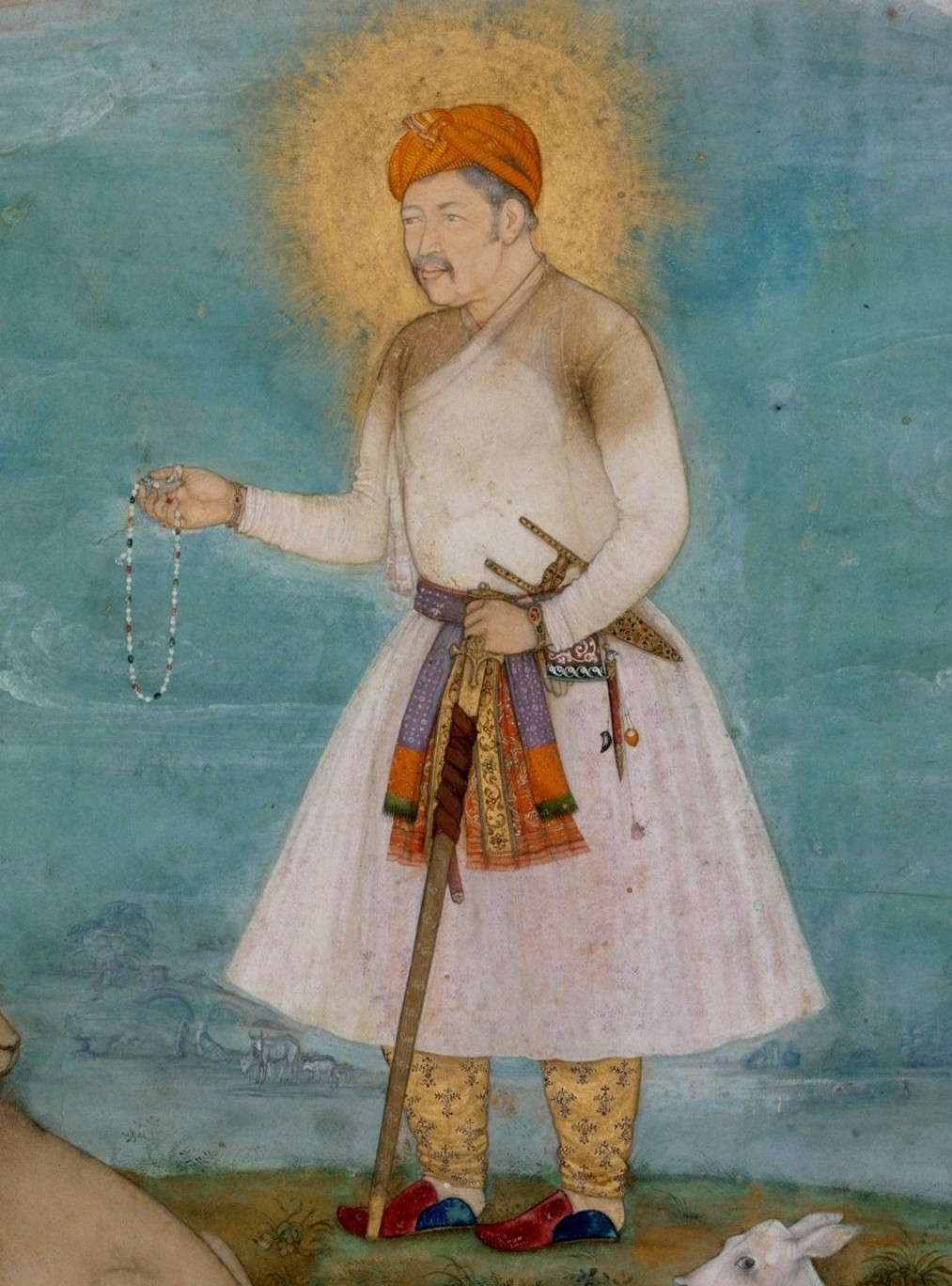
Akbar, under whom the zabt system was codified in the 1570s and 1580s through the reforms supervised by Raja Todar Mal. Painting by Govardhan, c. 1630.

The mature Mughal revenue system was codified under Akbar in the 1570s and 1580s, primarily through the zabt reforms supervised by Raja Todar Mal and documented in Abu'l-Fazl's Ain-i-Akbari. Under zabt, cultivated land in the imperial core was measured in standard bighas, classified by soil type and cropping pattern, and rated in silver dams per bigha on a ten-year average of cash-equivalent yields. The resulting schedules, codified in the dastur-ul-amal (manual of practice), produced the jama totals recorded for the twelve subahs of the Ain-i-Akbari. Shireen Moosvi's reconstruction of the late-sixteenth-century economy placed the aggregate jama of the empire at approximately 3.6 billion dams (c. 90 million rupees) in the twenty-fourth regnal year of Akbar, with the subahs of Delhi, Agra, Allahabad, Awadh, Lahore, and Multan together accounting for about half.

Revenue in the assessed tracts was collected from the peasant (ra'iyati) cultivator either directly by state officials or, more commonly, through the mediation of zamindars holding hereditary revenue rights over units ranging from single villages to entire parganas. Two systems of assessment coexisted outside the zabt core. Ghalla-bakhshi (crop-sharing) was retained in Kashmir, Thatta in Sindh, and parts of Bengal and Orissa where annual variation made cash rating impractical. Nasaq (summary assessment based on village totals rather than measured plots) was used where zabt had not been extended or where terrain made surveying difficult.

The system was stable during the reigns of Akbar, Jahangir, and the early years of Shah Jahan so long as three conditions held. The first was that the revenue demand on the cultivator remained within the range he could yield without distress, which Habib placed at roughly one-third of the gross produce in the zabt core and up to one-half in some ghalla-bakhshi regions. The second was that the jama and the hasil remained reasonably close, which in Akbar's and Jahangir's reigns they generally did. The third was that a healthy paibaqi of unassigned revenue was kept available for the assignment of new officers and for the emperor's khalisa.

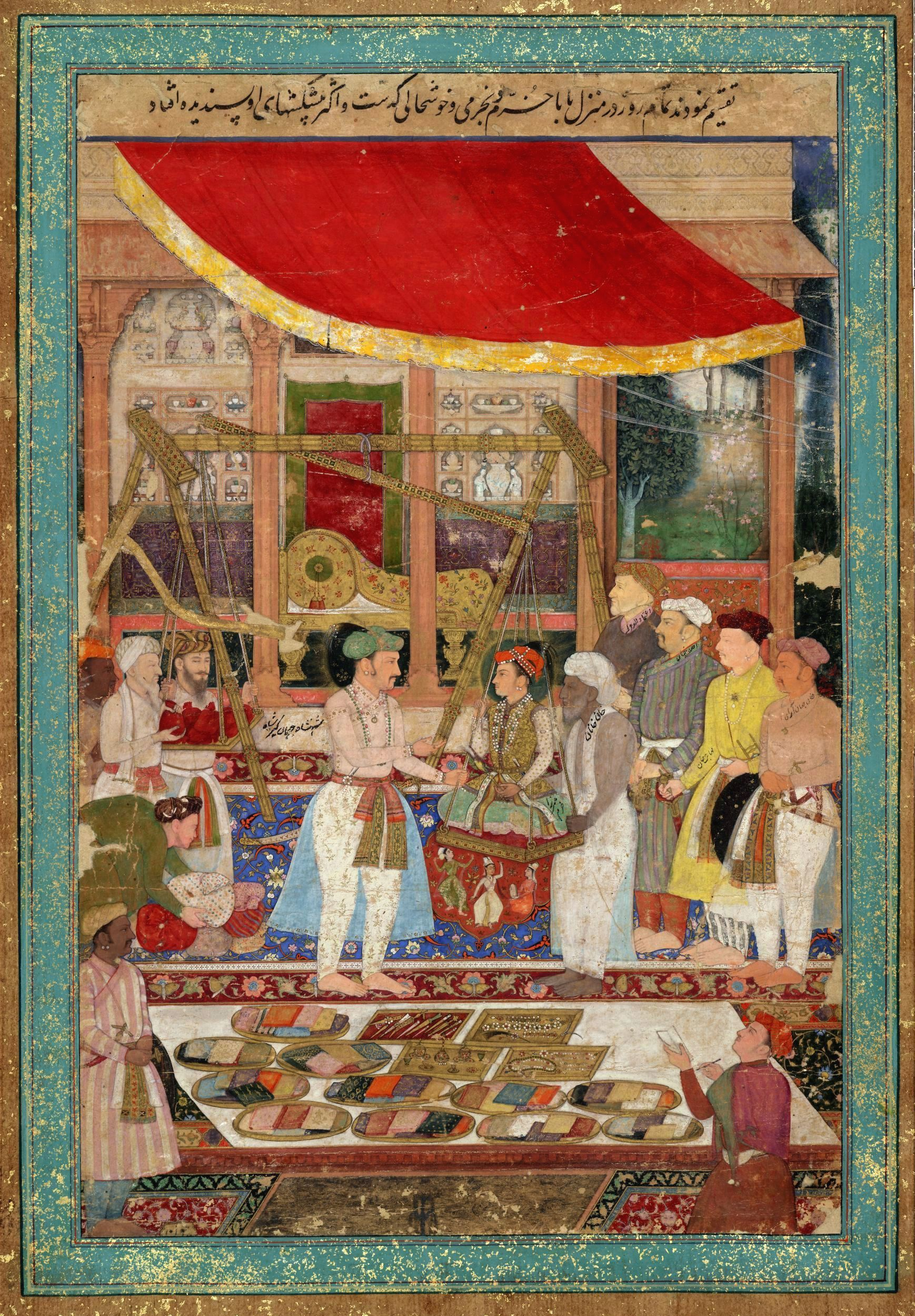
Emperor Jahangir weighs Prince Khurram, the future Shah Jahan, c. 1610–15. Jahangir's reign marked the last period in which the revenue demand, the paibaqi, and the realised hasil remained in rough equilibrium.

Under Shah Jahan the system began to register pressure. The khalisa was expanded substantially to fund the building of Shahjahanabad and the imperial architectural programme, removing land from the paibaqi reserve. The number of mansabdars on the imperial rolls rose from approximately two thousand at the end of Jahangir's reign to more than eight thousand by the middle of Shah Jahan's, concentrating salary claims on a service class that had substantially grown. Habib argued that contemporary Persian administrative documents show officers during Shah Jahan's later reign negotiating jagir transfers more frequently and with longer delays than a generation earlier, and that the practice of mah-i-muqarrara (fixed-month) rating, by which the nominal value of a jagir was paid out at a fraction of its formal assessment, was institutionalised from the 1640s onward. By the middle of the seventeenth century, the Mughal revenue state was structurally under strain even before the specific pressures of Aurangzeb's reign began to accumulate.

== The Habib thesis ==
Habib's central claim was that the high revenue demand characteristic of the mature Mughal system was not sustainable once three reinforcing pressures had accumulated: rising rates of assessment, deteriorating collection, and the rigidity of the rotating jagir system. In the zabt schedules of the Ain-i-Akbari, the state's share of the gross produce was recorded as one-third. By the middle of Aurangzeb's reign, Habib argued, the effective share had risen to between one-half and two-thirds of the gross produce in many localities, through a combination of upward revision, cess additions, and local abuse. The squeeze was intensified by the structure of the jagir system: assignees rotated every three or four years had a strong incentive to extract the maximum from their tract during their tenure, since they would not benefit from any long-term improvement. Habib treated the frequent rotation of jagirs as an engine of short-horizon extraction, producing predatory collection rather than sustainable agricultural management.

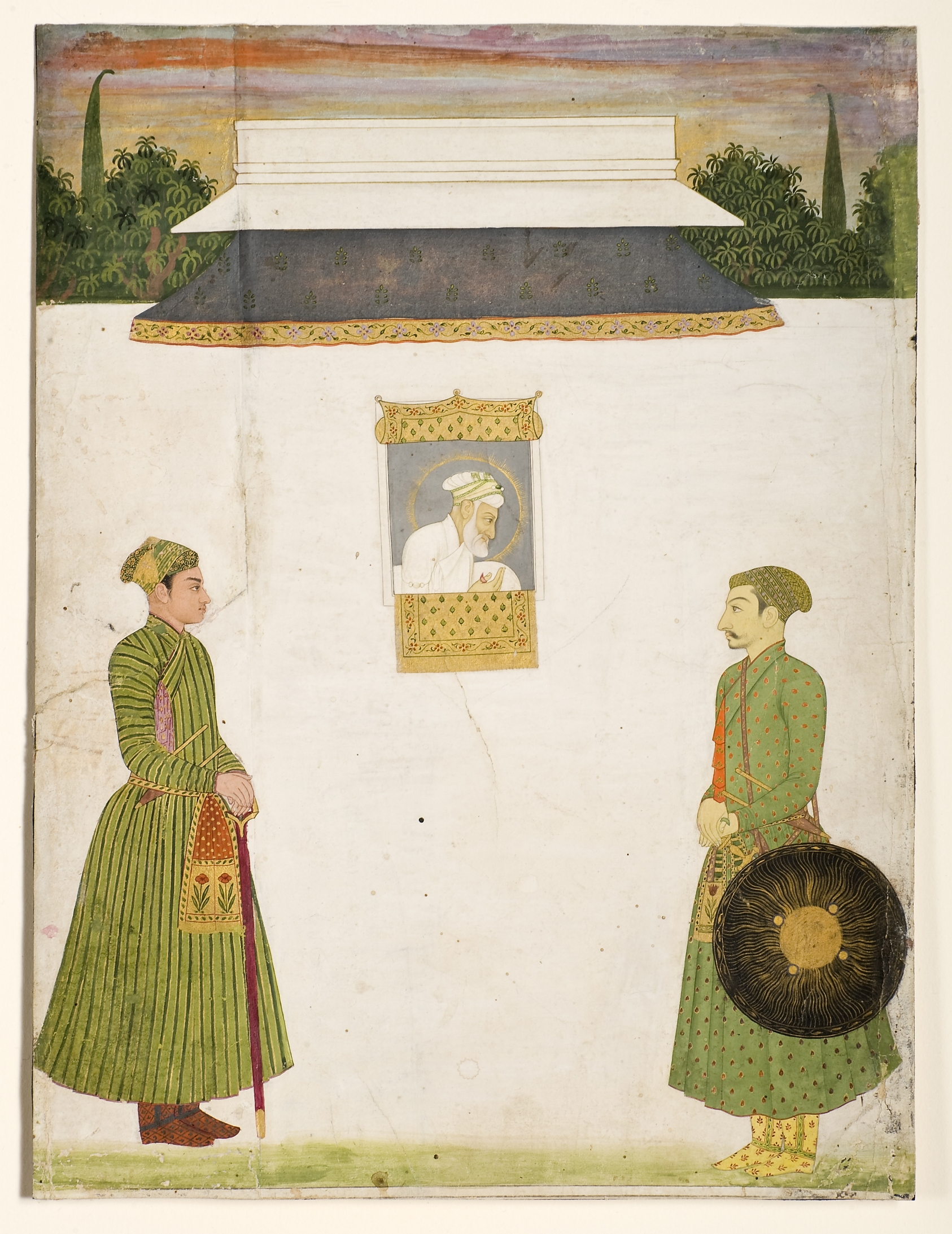
Aurangzeb at a jharokha window, with attendant nobles. The emperor dispatched his personal imperial guard during campaigns against the Satnami rebels in 1672, the kind of peasant-zamindar rising that Habib read as an expression of the underlying agrarian crisis.

The consequences at the level of the cultivator were, in Habib's account, immediate and cumulative. Peasants abandoned their holdings and fled to regions where the demand was lower or to zamindar-led settlements where protection could be obtained. Abandoned land (banjar) grew as a share of the total cultivated area in the Doab, in Malwa, in Gujarat, and in parts of the Punjab through the 1680s and 1690s. Villages recorded as uftada (fallen, deserted) appear in the Rajasthani revenue documents preserved in the Rajasthan State Archives at Bikaner, which Habib drew on and which Satya Prakash Gupta and later Dilbagh Singh examined at length for the eastern Rajasthan region under Jaipur. The revenue documents from Aurangzeb's later reign record petitions from provincial governors asking for remissions and transfers, and imperial farmans acknowledging that revenue could not be realised.

At the level of the zamindar, Habib argued, the squeeze produced militarisation. Zamindars were typically of the same caste and region as their peasants and possessed armed retinues of their own. Where the state's revenue demand exceeded the land's capacity, zamindars had a choice between absorbing the shortfall, passing it to the peasants (and risking rural depopulation), or resisting the imperial claim. Habib documented the growing frequency of armed zamindar resistance through the farmans preserved in the Rajasthan, Mughal, and Bikaner archives, and argued that a substantial share of the military commitments of the late imperial state was directed at policing zamindar holdings rather than at external enemies. In several regions, caste-based and religious movements accompanied the resistance: the Jat revolts around Mathura from 1669, the Satnami uprising of 1672 in Narnaul, and the Sikh revolts in the Punjab from the later 1670s were read by Habib as peasant-zamindar risings articulated through the vocabulary of caste or confession.

The crisis, in Habib's reading, was self-reinforcing. Peasant flight shrank the cultivated area. A shrinking cultivated area reduced realisable revenue. Reduced revenue intensified the pressure on the remaining cultivators and on the zamindars. The state responded to revenue shortfall by expanding the khalisa at the expense of the paibaqi, rotating jagirs more frequently, and granting rank more liberally to conciliate new noble constituencies. Each response intensified the extractive pressure that had produced the shortfall in the first place.

Two features of Habib's account distinguish it from earlier descriptions of Mughal fiscal difficulty. The first is its insistence on the rate of extraction, rather than the absolute size of the demand, as the operative variable. (Note: Earlier colonial and nationalist historians, notably W. H. Moreland and Romesh Chunder Dutt, had emphasised the heavy burden of Mughal taxation on the peasantry. Habib's distinctive contribution was to trace the specific mechanism by which a high but stable rate became an unsustainable one through the operation of the jagir rotation, the expansion of the service elite, and the contraction of the paibaqi.) The jama of the mature empire was large in absolute terms, but the critical question, for Habib, was what share of the crop it represented and whether that share left the cultivator with sufficient margin to sustain agriculture. The second is its treatment of the zamindar as a structurally ambivalent figure. The zamindar was at once an agent of imperial extraction and a potential obstacle to it, and the balance between these two functions, Habib argued, shifted decisively against the state as the revenue demand became unsustainable.

== Symptoms and evidence ==
The evidence for the crisis assembled by Habib and subsequent scholars falls into four overlapping registers: documentary, chronicle, regional, and quantitative.

=== Documentary evidence ===
The documentary register consists of imperial farmans, provincial nishans (orders of the governor), and estate papers preserved in the Rajasthan archives at Bikaner, the National Archives of India in Delhi, and the Aligarh and Jaipur collections. Habib, working through more than a thousand such documents from Akbar's reign to the middle of Aurangzeb's, traced a progressive shift in the administrative vocabulary. Early farmans concerned themselves primarily with the assignment of rank and jagir, the recording of jama totals, and the regulation of revenue officials. By the later seventeenth century, the same vocabulary was preoccupied with peasant flight, uncollectable arrears, zamindar defiance, and the need for military detachments to accompany revenue officials on collection tours.

Provincial governors' correspondence from the 1690s and 1700s recorded specific localities in which cultivation had ceased. The subadar of Gujarat reported in 1684 that many parganas in the suba had been abandoned by their peasants, that the jama could not be collected, and that zamindars were refusing to cooperate with imperial officials. Similar reports survive from the governors of Malwa, from the diwan of Awadh under Aurangzeb, and from the faujdars of the Doab who had responsibility for the heart of the imperial agricultural base.

=== Chronicle evidence ===
The peasantry, under pressure of heavy demands, left their villages and took refuge in the lands of the zamindars, whose armed retainers could resist the exactions of the imperial officers. In many parganas, cultivation ceased altogether, and what had been taxable land reverted to waste.

— Irfan Habib, summarising the archival record for the later reign of Aurangzeb

Mughal chronicle writers recorded the same phenomena in a different register. Saqi Mustaid Khan's Ma'asir-i-'Alamgiri, a court chronicle of Aurangzeb's reign, recorded the emperor's repeated orders for campaigns of discipline against zamindars in the Doab, in the Mewar marches, and in the Punjab, and noted that the paibaqi had shrunk so far that fresh recruits to the mansabdari could no longer be assigned jagirs. Khafi Khan, writing in the first decades of the eighteenth century with the benefit of retrospect, presented the same pattern as the cumulative failure of the revenue state, arguing that the formal administrative machinery had outlasted the fiscal substance that gave it meaning.

Chronicle evidence supports but does not alone establish the crisis thesis. As Satish Chandra observed, court chroniclers tended to emphasise imperial discipline and to understate the scale of rural disturbance, while partisan chroniclers from successor states sometimes exaggerated it. The documentary record in the farmans and revenue papers, less rhetorically shaped, is therefore treated by most scholars as the primary evidentiary base.

=== Regional case studies ===
The third register consists of regional studies that test the general claim against locally dense evidence. Satya Prakash Gupta's 1986 monograph on the agrarian system of eastern Rajasthan under the Kachwaha Rajputs of Amber (Jaipur) between 1650 and 1750 drew on the extensive Rajasthani dastur and chitthi archive to document peasant desertion, zamindar militarisation, and land reversion. Dilbagh Singh's work on the same region extended Gupta's findings. Muzaffar Alam's 1986 study of Awadh and the Punjab, while disputing Habib's conclusion of uniform collapse, accepted that the formal revenue order had broken down; he argued, however, that in Awadh the breakdown produced a realignment of authority under the nawabi rather than fiscal disintegration. Chetan Singh's 1991 study of the seventeenth-century Punjab documented the chronic insufficiency of the hasil against the jama in the trans-Sutlej districts.

=== Quantitative evidence ===
Mansabdars of 1,000 zat and above, 1595–1707
Period and reign	Number of mansabdars
c. 1595 (Akbar)	98
c. 1628 (Jahangir, end)	200
c. 1646 (Shah Jahan)	350
1658–78 (Aurangzeb)	486
1679–1707 (Aurangzeb)	575

Growth of the upper mansabdari service class across the seventeenth century. Counts after Athar Ali (1968); the Shah Jahan figure is the midpoint of Ali's 300–400 range for the twentieth regnal year.

Moosvi's reconstruction of the 1595 revenue totals from the Ain-i-Akbari provides the quantitative baseline for the crisis. Comparison with the jama totals from the later seventeenth and early eighteenth century, read across Habib, Siddiqi, and the provincial studies, shows that nominal totals continued to grow even as realised revenue stagnated or fell. The gap between jama and hasil, interpreted by Habib as the quantitative signature of the crisis, widened from roughly fifteen to twenty percent at the end of Akbar's reign to forty percent or more in some provinces by the 1690s.

The mansab rolls supply a second quantitative register. The following table collates Athar Ali's canonical counts of mansabdars of 1,000 zat and above across the seventeenth century, providing the clearest contemporaneous numerical series against which the hasil shortfall can be read.

Read against the hasil shortfall, the mansab series shows the two principal pressures converging through the second half of the seventeenth century: a rising number of salary claims on an increasingly strained revenue base. Moosvi and Richards have both warned, however, that the mansab counts need to be read alongside the mashrut (conditional) and mashruta rank subcategories, which admitted considerable flexibility in the actual obligations assigned to any given officer, and that treating the numerical rolls as a pure indicator of fiscal pressure risks oversimplification.

== Regional variation ==
The crisis did not register uniformly across the empire. Regional evidence shows substantial variation in timing, intensity, and political outcome, and scholarship since the 1980s has increasingly emphasised this variation as a correction to the general thesis.

Regional manifestations of the agrarian crisis, c. 1680–1750
Region	Principal evidence	Political trajectory by 1750	Sources
Doab (imperial core)	Jat revolts from 1669; Satnami uprising 1672; Agra paibaqi contraction by 1690s	Chronic instability; formal imperial status retained	
Punjab	Sikh armed resistance from 1670s; hasil shortfall in trans-Sutlej districts	Subadari fragmentation; Sikh misls emergent	
Awadh	Jama/hasil divergence from 1700s; peasant flight in Baiswara and the Gorakhpur marches	Nawabi consolidation under Sa'adat Khan from 1722	
Rajputana (Jaipur)	Village desertion recorded in Rajasthani archives; uftada revenue rolls	"Hollowing" managed by Kachwaha Rajputs in negotiation with imperial diwani	
Gujarat	Maratha raids on Surat 1664 and 1670; peasant flight from Ahmedabad plain in 1680s	Divided authority; Maratha revenue contracting in border parganas	
Bengal	Limited crisis signature; rice-economy buoyancy; maritime trade continuity	Self-funding nawabi under Murshid Quli Khan from 1717	
Deccan (post-1686)	High nominal jama; chronic hasil shortfall; continuing Maratha contestation	Nizamate of Hyderabad under Nizam-ul-Mulk from 1724; Maratha Confederacy across western India	

=== The Doab and imperial core ===
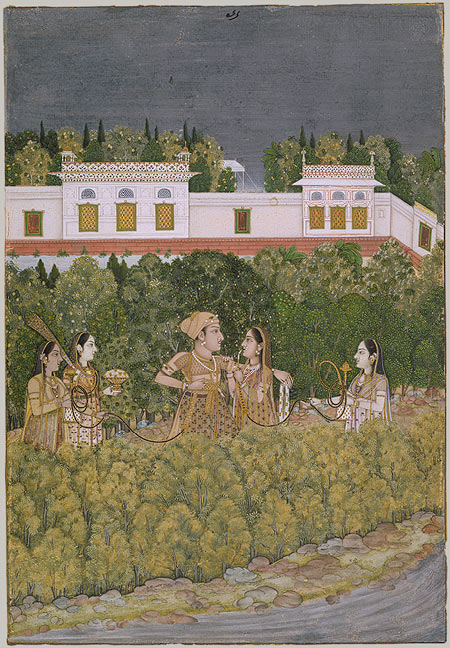
Mughal court life in the later seventeenth century. Regional studies document sharply divergent trajectories beneath the surface of imperial continuity.

The Doab, the triangular region between the Ganges and the Yamuna from the Delhi–Agra axis east to Allahabad, was the fiscal and imperial core of the empire. It was also, by Habib's account, the region in which the crisis registered earliest and with the greatest intensity. The Jat revolts around Mathura from 1669, the Satnami uprising of 1672 in Narnaul, and the chronic disturbances of the Agra suba in the 1680s and 1690s produced a pattern of armed resistance, punitive expeditions, and partial imperial recovery that continued into the eighteenth century. Richards documented Aurangzeb's faujdari system for the Doab and its inability to pacify the countryside for extended periods. The paibaqi of the Agra suba, the largest single reserve of assignable land in the empire, shrank through the 1680s and had reached the point by the 1700s at which jagir assignments were routinely delayed.

=== The Punjab ===
The Punjab was the second major theatre of the crisis. Chetan Singh's study of the seventeenth-century suba documented the chronic insufficiency of the hasil against the jama in the trans-Sutlej districts, the growth of zamindar-led armed contingents, and the complex accommodation between the imperial subadari and the Sikh community. Aurangzeb's conflict with Guru Tegh Bahadur, the ninth Sikh Guru, in the 1670s, and with Guru Gobind Singh's armed resistance from the 1680s, Habib treated as surface expressions of the same zamindar-peasant pressure that registered in other provinces under different names. Alam's 1986 study argued that in the Punjab the subadari fragmented more completely than in Awadh: by the 1720s the provincial administration had effectively ceded revenue collection in many districts to local intermediaries and to armed Sikh bodies.

=== Awadh ===
Awadh, the suba east of the Doab centred on Lucknow and Faizabad, occupies a distinctive place in the regional literature because Alam's 1986 study used it as the principal case against the uniform-collapse reading of the agrarian crisis. Alam accepted that the formal Mughal revenue order had broken down in Awadh: the jama and the hasil diverged sharply from the 1700s, zamindars refused cooperation with imperial officials, and peasant flight was recorded in the parganas of Baiswara and the Gorakhpur marches. He argued, however, that the breakdown produced a reconfiguration rather than a disintegration of fiscal authority. Under Sa'adat Khan and his successors the provincial administration was rebuilt on a different footing, with the nawab cultivating direct ties with local zamindars and with a reformed revenue demand calibrated to what the land could yield. The nawabi that emerged in the 1720s and 1730s was, in Alam's reading, the product of the same pressures that in other provinces produced collapse, channelled into a different political outcome.

=== Rajasthan ===
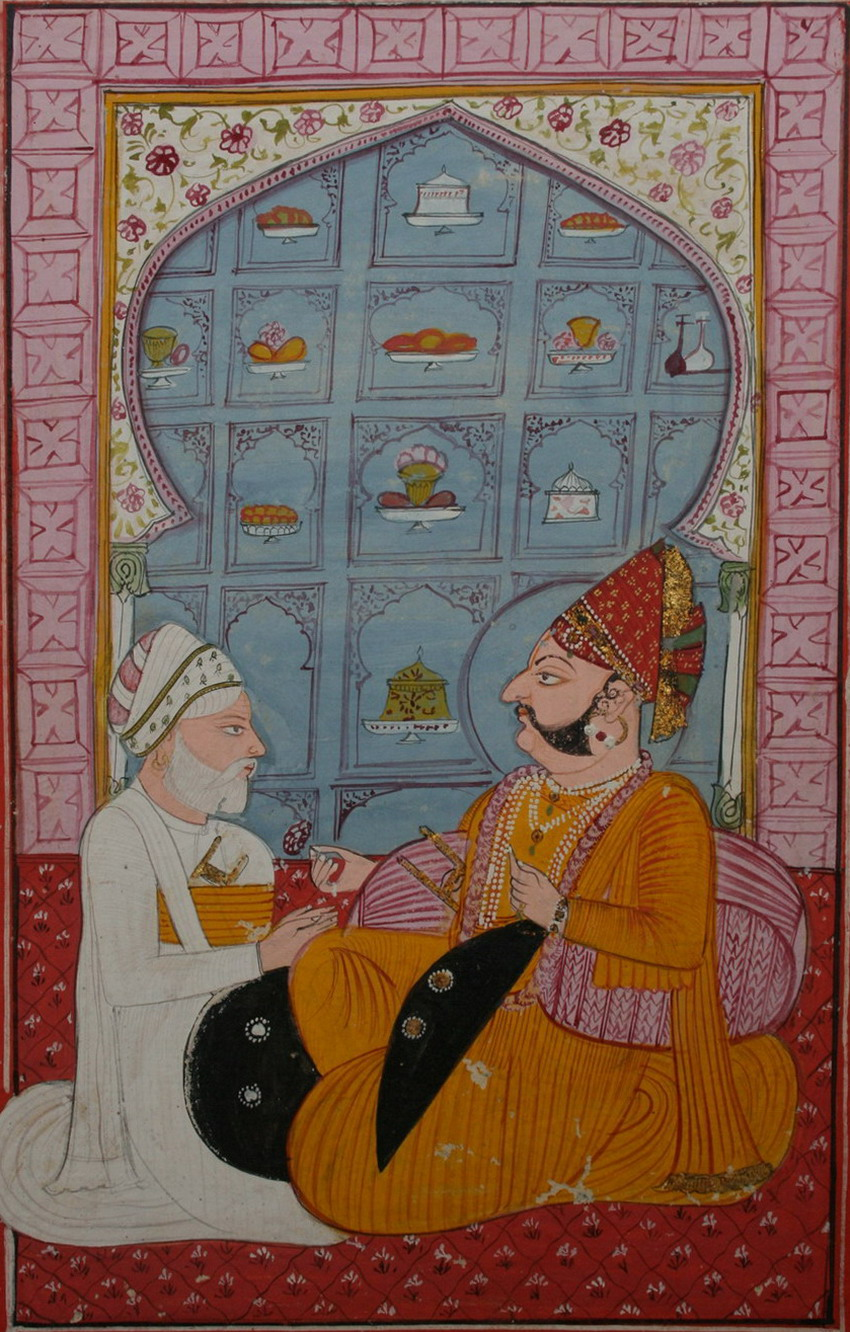
Durgadas Rathore before Maharaja Ajit Singh of Marwar. The Rajputana marches are the most densely documented region for the crisis because of the survival of the Rajasthani dastur and chitthi archive.

The Rajputana marches, in particular the Kachwaha territory of Amber (later Jaipur), are the most densely documented region for the agrarian crisis because of the survival of the Rajasthani dastur and chitthi archive in the Rajasthan State Archives at Bikaner. Gupta's 1986 monograph on eastern Rajasthan between 1650 and 1750 documented the progressive desertion of villages in the Jaipur territory, the reversion of cultivated land to pasture, the growth of zamindar-led resistance, and the chronic divergence of the jama from the hasil. The pattern in Rajasthan was not of collapse but of what Gupta called "hollowing": the formal administrative frame continued to record revenue on paper even as the realised flow diminished, and the Kachwaha ruling house managed the hollowing through a combination of concession to zamindars and negotiation with the imperial diwani.

=== Gujarat ===
Gujarat presented a third regional pattern. The suba had long been fiscally valuable through the trade of Surat and the cash-cropping of the parganas around Ahmedabad. The Maratha raids on Surat in 1664 and 1670 had already weakened the trading base by the time the agrarian pressure registered in the countryside. By the 1680s, provincial governors were reporting widespread peasant flight from the parganas of the Ahmedabad plain, and by the 1700s the subadari was effectively divided between the imperial officer at Ahmedabad, the Maratha revenue contractors in the parganas bordering the Maratha country, and the zamindar-led resistance of the central plain.

=== Bengal ===
Bengal has been treated in most of the literature as the major exception to the crisis thesis. Under the nawabi of Murshid Quli Khan from 1717 and his successors, the suba reorganised its revenue system through the farming of collection rights to substantial zamindars under a reformed settlement that produced a rising and predictable revenue flow into the 1750s. Richards argued that Bengal's maritime trade and the overall buoyancy of its rice economy insulated the province from the fiscal pressures that registered in the north. Subrahmanyam and others have treated the Bengal case as evidence for the revisionist argument that regional economies retained considerable dynamism even as the imperial extraction system unravelled.

=== The Deccan ===
The Deccan after the incorporation of Bijapur in 1686 and Golconda in 1687 constituted a special case. The formal jama of the new Deccan subas was entered into the imperial ledgers at high nominal values, but the hasil remained chronically low because the countryside was contested by the Marathas and because the zamindars of the Deccan (deshmukhs and deshpandes) retained substantial independent authority. Habib treated the Deccan as an intensification of the crisis pattern observable in the north: the same mismatch between formal assessment and realised collection, magnified by the continuing military contest. Richards argued that the Deccan wars generated the fiscal pressure that tipped the imperial revenue system from chronic strain into terminal crisis, and that without the Deccan incorporation the northern agrarian pressure might have been absorbed.

== Causes ==
The causation of the agrarian crisis has been argued about continuously since Habib's 1963 formulation. Four principal families of explanation recur in the literature, overlapping in much of their evidentiary base but differing in their causal priority.

=== The extraction-rate thesis ===
Habib's original account located primary causation in the rate of extraction. The state's share of gross produce, recorded in the Ain-i-Akbari at roughly one-third, rose through the seventeenth century to between one-half and two-thirds in many localities through a combination of formal revision, cess additions, and local abuse. A demand of this magnitude, Habib argued, did not leave the cultivator enough above subsistence to maintain capital in the form of cattle, seed, and agricultural tools; once the margin was exhausted, peasant flight and zamindar resistance followed directly. On this account, the jagirdari crisis, the factional politics of the post-Aurangzeb court, and the credit-withdrawal phenomenon were all downstream consequences of the upstream pressure on the land-revenue relationship.

=== The monetisation and price thesis ===
Silver coin of Aurangzeb. The seventeenth century saw sustained silver influx into the Mughal economy, producing real price rises against fixed zabt assessment rates.

A second family of explanations focuses on monetary and price conditions. S. Nurul Hasan and later writers argued that the seventeenth century was a period of sustained silver influx into the Mughal economy, that commodity prices rose against the fixed zabt rates and the fixed jama totals, and that the real burden on the cultivator increased as the nominal burden held steady. On this reading, the crisis was not principally a matter of state extraction but of the interaction between state extraction and the commodity economy: a state that collected in cash but whose schedules were updated slowly could not keep pace with rising prices, and the gap was transferred in complex ways across the revenue chain. This framing accepts Habib's evidence for peasant distress but relocates the primary causal weight from the imperial demand to the intersection of that demand with a changing monetary environment.

=== The factional and political thesis ===
Satish Chandra's Parties and Politics at the Mughal Court, 1707–1740 treated the factional competition among the four major noble blocs of the imperial service class (Turani, Irani, Hindustani, Deccani) as the proximate driver of the post-Aurangzeb collapse. Chandra accepted the Habib framework as the structural context for factional competition: as available revenue contracted, the competition among the noble blocs for shrinking salaries intensified, and the struggle for the imperial succession from 1707 through the 1730s was shaped by the underlying fiscal squeeze. On Chandra's reading, the agrarian crisis supplied the substrate, while factional politics supplied the proximate mechanism of the political unravelling.

=== The regional-economy thesis ===
A fourth family of explanations, developed from the 1980s by Alam, C. A. Bayly, Sanjay Subrahmanyam, and Frank Perlin, argued that the picture of general economic collapse that Habib's account implied did not hold when regional evidence was read on its own terms. In this reading, the breakdown of the imperial extraction system did not coincide with a collapse of regional production and trade. In Awadh, in Bengal, in the Punjab qasbas, and in the Rajput states, eighteenth-century regional economies showed continuing or even expanding activity in precisely the period Habib's account treated as crisis. Bayly documented the urban prosperity of the north Indian qasbas in the eighteenth century, Subrahmanyam the continuing vitality of overseas trade from the Coromandel and the western coast, and Alam the fiscal reconstruction of Awadh under the nawabi. The revisionist position did not dispute that imperial revenue had collapsed; it disputed the equation of imperial revenue collapse with general economic crisis.

=== Climate, demography, and exogenous pressures ===
A further line of argument, pursued intermittently since the 1970s, attributes part of the crisis to exogenous pressures of climate, epidemic disease, and military invasion rather than to the internal operation of the revenue system. The later seventeenth and earlier eighteenth century falls within the span of the Little Ice Age, and regional climatic perturbations affecting monsoon reliability have been documented for parts of the subcontinent in this period. The famines of 1630–1632 in the Deccan and Gujarat, the subsistence crises recorded in the Doab in the late 1680s, and the severe famine of 1702–1704 in the south all appear in the chronicle and colonial-observer records, and some scholars have argued that these climatic stresses interacted with the revenue pressure to produce outcomes that were worse than either cause alone. Habib accepted the role of specific famines in sharpening particular local crises but held to the view that the underlying structural pressure was the revenue demand rather than the climatic shock.

The military context supplied further exogenous pressure. Jos Gommans's 2002 study of Mughal warfare traced the expansion of cavalry-based armies, the absorption of Afghan and Central Asian horsemen into the mansabdari from the later seventeenth century, and the logistical demands of the Deccan campaigns. Gommans argued that the military apparatus itself consumed resources at a pace that the revenue system could not sustain, and that the fiscal pressure Habib identified was intensified by the specific cost of cavalry warfare against mobile enemies in the Deccan and the Rajputana. Recent comparative work on early-modern military revolutions has linked these pressures to the parallel experiences of the Ottomans and the Safavids, treating the Mughal case as one instance of a broader pattern of fiscal strain produced by the rising cost of permanent standing armies.

== Consequences ==
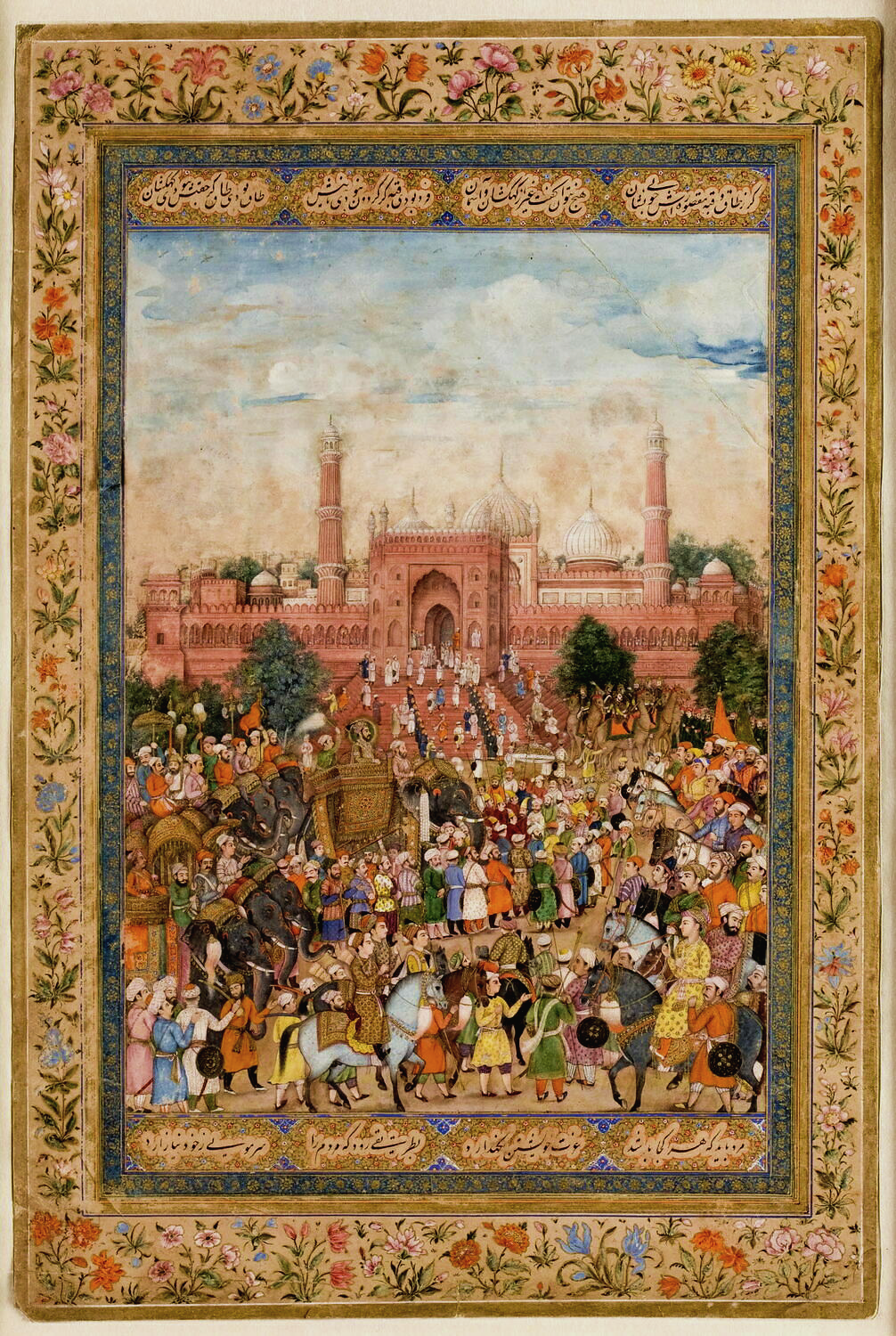
Delhi under Farrukhsiyar (r. 1713–1719). The imperial core shrank through the early eighteenth century as the revenue system that had sustained it contracted.

The consequences of the agrarian crisis, as distinct from its causes, are less disputed in the literature than its causation.

=== Political unrest ===
The most visible consequence was the growth of armed resistance to the imperial revenue state. The Jat, Satnami, Sikh, and zamindar revolts of the 1670s through the 1710s are treated in the mainstream literature as expressions, in caste and religious idiom, of the underlying land-revenue pressure. Habib argued that the frequency, scale, and geographic distribution of these revolts tracked the distribution of the revenue squeeze more closely than any other variable, and that their persistence through the early eighteenth century was a reliable indicator that the underlying pressure had not been resolved.

=== Fiscal exhaustion ===
The second consequence was the progressive exhaustion of the imperial fiscal capcity The paibaqi of the imperial core contracted through the 1680s and 1690s; the khalisa was expanded at the expense of the paibaqi to cover the shortfall; the rotation of jagirs was accelerated; and the mah-i-muqarrara discounting of nominal assignments became routine. Each of these measures addressed the immediate cash-flow problem and deepened the structural one. By the middle of Aurangzeb's Deccan campaigns after 1690, the empire was operating its military and administrative apparatus on what Habib and Richards both describe as fiscal reserves rather than current revenue.

=== The jagirdari crisis ===
The third consequence, in Habib's framework, was the jagirdari crisis: the chronic mismatch between the expanding mansabdari and the contracting paibaqi. Habib treated the jagirdari crisis as a downstream symptom of the agrarian crisis, since the paibaqi could not be replenished from a shrinking realisable-revenue base. Athar Ali, writing in 1966, had introduced the jagirdari crisis as an analytical category in its own right; Habib's 1963 work provided what he argued was the upstream cause. In most post-1993 synthetic accounts, the two crises are treated as distinct but interlocking: the jagirdari crisis is the visible, administrative registration of a pressure whose roots lay in the agrarian relationship.

=== Succession and fragmentation ===
The fourth consequence was the political succession to the empire. The fiscal and military weakness of the late Aurangzeb and post-Aurangzeb state made it unable to suppress the regional and caste-based rebellions on its peripheries, and the zamindars and communities that had resisted the imperial demand became, in the course of the early eighteenth century, the basis of successor polities. The nawabi of Awadh, the nawabi of Bengal, the Maratha polity of the Deccan and western India, the Sikh misls of the Punjab, the Jat state of Bharatpur, and the Rajput states in the Rajputana marches all emerged from the conditions of the crisis. Alam's argument that what registered in Delhi as collapse appeared in the regions as reconfiguration is, in this framing, an argument about consequences rather than causes.

The chronology of succession varied considerably by region. In Awadh, the subadari was raised to a functionally independent nawabi under Sa'adat Khan's tenure from 1722, and consolidated further under Safdar Jang and Shuja-ud-Daula through the 1750s. In Bengal, Murshid Quli Khan's reorganisation from 1717 produced what became, by the 1740s, a self-funding regional state whose revenue surplus attracted the attention of the East India Company. In the Deccan, Nizam-ul-Mulk's break from imperial authority after 1724 produced the Nizamate of Hyderabad, while the Maratha polity under the Peshwas expanded to inherit much of the imperial revenue command across western and central India. In the Punjab, the fragmentation was more complete: Sikh misls consolidated around local zamindar constituencies, and the subadari had ceased to exercise effective authority in many districts by the 1750s. The shared feature across these trajectories, in Alam's framing, was that each successor state rebuilt its fiscal apparatus on a more accommodative basis than the late imperial one, with a demand calibrated to what the local land could yield and with a more durable relationship between ruler, zamindar, and cultivator.

=== Nadir Shah's invasion and the passage from chronic to terminal ===
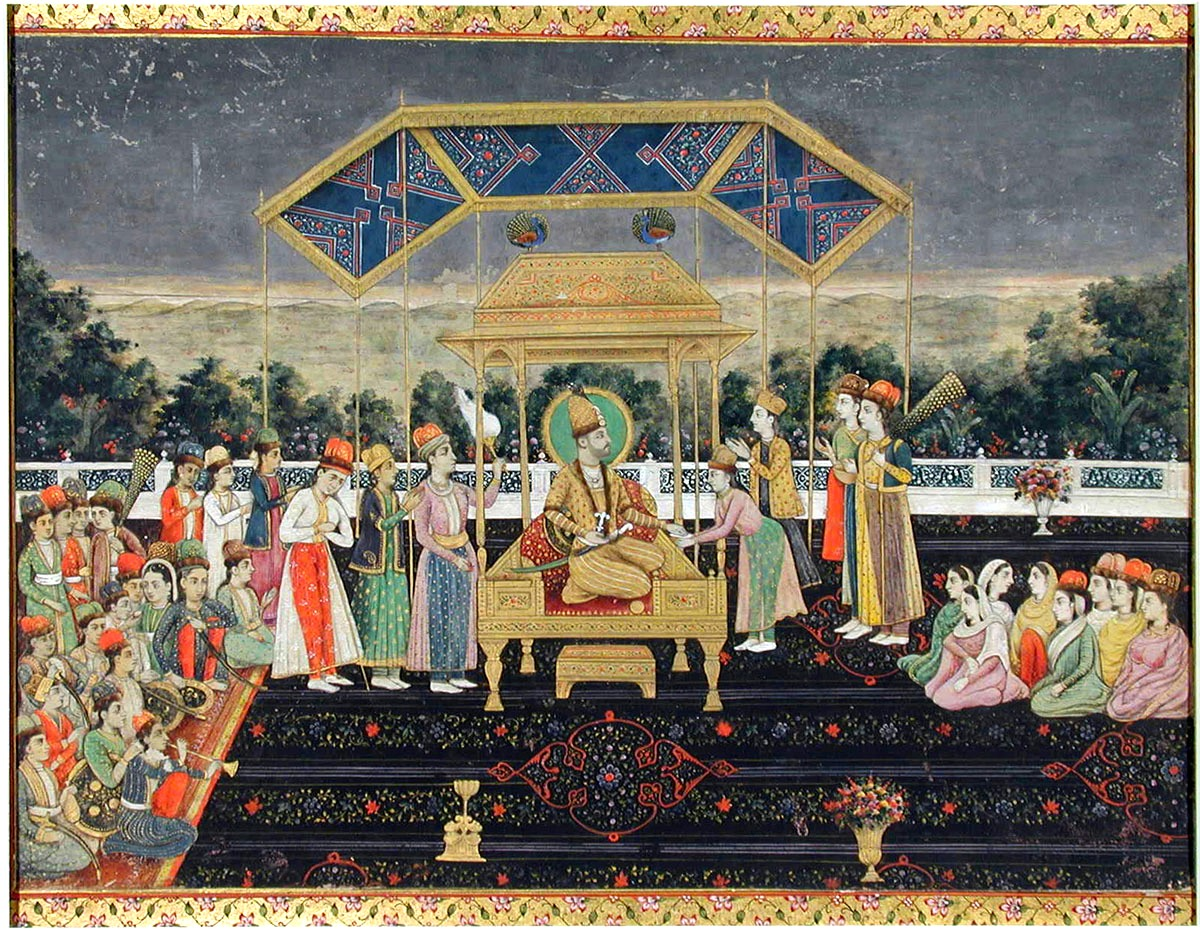
Nader Shah on the Peacock Throne after his defeat of Muhammad Shah at the Battle of Karnal in 1739. The sack of Delhi that followed removed the empire's remaining fiscal reserves.

The invasion of Nadir Shah in 1738–1739 and the sack of Delhi in March 1739 are commonly treated as the point at which the chronic crisis passed into terminal collapse. Nadir Shah removed an estimated 700 million rupees' worth of treasure from Delhi, destroyed the remaining fiscal reserves of the imperial state, and exposed the inability of the imperial military to defend the capital. In the forty years that followed, the empire contracted sharply in territorial extent and in revenue command; the agrarian crisis, which in 1700 had been a chronic structural pressure, had by the 1750s become a condition of political fragmentation.

The invasions of Ahmad Shah Abdali from 1748 through the 1760s deepened the damage. The Battle of Panipat in January 1761, fought between Abdali and the Maratha Confederacy rather than between Abdali and the imperial army, registered the degree to which the empire had ceased to be a military player in its own defence. Historians read the forty years between Nadir Shah's sack and the Maratha defeat at Panipat as the period in which the structural pressures that Habib described as the agrarian crisis produced their final political outcome: the fragmentation of the imperial order into the regional powers that the East India Company encountered in its expansion from Bengal after 1757.

== Historiography ==
The agrarian crisis has been continuously debated since Habib's 1963 formulation. The debate has in practice been about the causal priority of Habib's extraction-rate mechanism relative to other explanations, the accuracy of the general thesis against regional evidence, and the relationship between the agrarian crisis and the political and military decline of the empire.

=== The Aligarh school ===
Habib's thesis is the central text of the Aligarh school of Mughal history, grouped around Habib, M. Athar Ali, S. Nurul Hasan, Shireen Moosvi, Satish Chandra (in his earlier career), and later a generation of students including Dilbagh Singh, S. P. Gupta, and Iqtidar Alam Khan. The school's collective work, much of it published by the Indian History Congress and by Oxford University Press India from the 1960s through the 1990s, elaborated Habib's framework through quantitative, regional, and administrative studies. Moosvi's reconstruction of the 1595 economy supplied the statistical baseline; Ali's Mughal Nobility under Aurangzeb extended the analysis to the service elite; Nurul Hasan's essays on zamindars integrated the intermediate class; Gupta and Dilbagh Singh supplied regional confirmation from Rajasthan.

The Aligarh school's account is, in its own terms, methodologically explicit: it treats the administrative and documentary record as the primary evidentiary base, derives quantitative estimates from it where possible, and interprets the resulting picture through a broadly materialist framework in which the extractive relationship between state, zamindar, and peasant is the organising variable. Habib's own theoretical commitments, declared in the preface to the second edition of The Agrarian System, drew on Marxist economic history as then practiced in Britain and Europe, with the Indian material providing a comparative case for the study of pre-colonial extractive states.

The methodological choices of the Aligarh school have themselves been debated. Critics have argued that the heavy reliance on imperial administrative documents gives a state-centred view that may underestimate cultivator agency and that privileges the perspective of the extractor over the extracted. Defenders have responded that the documentary base is the most reliable evidence available for a period in which peasant voices were not recorded in surviving sources, and that the materialist interpretive framework makes the structural pressures on the cultivator visible precisely because it reads the administrative record against the grain of its own rhetorical preferences. The debate has in practice been about the interpretation of the evidence rather than its authenticity; few scholars have contested the documentary record that Habib and his colleagues assembled.

=== Revisionist critiques ===
The revisionist position, developed in the 1980s and 1990s by scholars including Alam, Bayly, Subrahmanyam, Frank Perlin, and David Washbrook, accepted much of the Aligarh school's documentary base while rejecting what they argued was its over-extension of a general collapse thesis. Bayly's Indian Society and the Making of the British Empire (1988) argued that the imperial revenue collapse coexisted with a flourishing regional economy in the qasbas of the north and in the trading hubs of the coast, and that the eighteenth century was better understood as a period of regional recomposition than as a unilinear decline. Subrahmanyam's essays on the "political economy of commerce" argued for continuing vitality in the maritime and inland trading networks in the same period. Perlin's work on proto-industrialisation and Washbrook's argument for a "long eighteenth century" in which capitalist forms were already developing in parts of the subcontinent provided further revisionist framings.

The revisionist critique has been absorbed into mainstream scholarship rather than superseding Habib's account. Most recent synthetic readings accept that the imperial revenue system did collapse in the terms Habib described, while allowing that regional production and trade were significantly less affected than a straight reading of Habib might imply.

=== The Cambridge synthesis ===
Richards's 1993 volume on the Mughal Empire in the New Cambridge History of India presented the dominant synthetic reading. Richards accepted the core of Habib's agrarian thesis, endorsed the Athar Ali jagirdari thesis as a related register, drew on Chandra for the factional dynamics, and incorporated Alam's regional-variation argument as the explanation for the uneven transition into successor polities. Richards's framing located the Mughal case, with qualifications of timing and mechanism, within the wider scholarly conversation about the "seventeenth-century crisis" in early-modern agrarian states; he had set out the argument for that comparative placement in an earlier essay in Modern Asian Studies.

=== Other interpretations ===
Karen Leonard's 1979 essay in Comparative Studies in Society and History proposed an alternative causal reading that displaced primary weight from the land-revenue relationship to the indigenous banking and credit system. On Leonard's "Great Firm" thesis, the empire's fiscal operation depended on the credit networks of the great Indian banking houses; when these houses began to transfer their creditor relationships from the Mughal centre to regional powers and the East India Company, the resulting credit withdrawal was the proximate cause of the fiscal unravelling, and the agrarian distress was a downstream symptom rather than an upstream cause. Richards and Habib both read Leonard's thesis as complementary to their own, with Richards arguing that the credit withdrawal followed rather than preceded the crisis on the revenue side.

Andrea Hintze's The Mughal Empire and Its Decline (1997) attempted an integrative reading under a Michael Mann-style sources-of-social-power framework. Hintze treated the agrarian, jagirdari, and factional crises as interacting expressions of a broader transformation in the relationship among ideological, economic, military, and political power in late-imperial India. Stephen Blake's study of Shahjahanabad supplied a patrimonial-bureaucratic reading of the imperial household as the locus of the crisis. Munis Faruqui's 2012 study of Mughal princely politics situated the agrarian pressure alongside the princely succession struggles as components of a common imperial unravelling.

=== Summary of historiographical positions ===
Principal historiographical positions on the agrarian crisis
Scholar	Year	Core argument
Irfan Habib	1963 (1999, 2013)	Extraction-rate crisis: rising real demand, peasant flight, and zamindar militarisation produced a self-reinforcing contraction of realised revenue
S. Nurul Hasan	1960s–1970s	Monetisation and price thesis: silver influx and fixed zabt rates produced rising real burdens on cultivators
Satish Chandra	1959	Factional politics at the imperial court is the proximate driver; agrarian pressure is the structural context
M. Athar Ali	1966	Jagirdari crisis (related but distinct category) centred on the nobility–revenue mismatch
Karen Leonard	1979	Withdrawal of Indian banking credit (Great Firm thesis) is the primary cause of the fiscal unravelling
Muzaffar Alam	1986	Regional variegation: what registered in Delhi as collapse appeared in the regions as reconfiguration
C. A. Bayly	1983, 1988	Revisionist: imperial revenue collapse coexisted with continuing regional economic vitality
Sanjay Subrahmanyam	1980s–1990s	Continuing vitality of inland and maritime trade networks; rejects uniform-collapse thesis
Frank Perlin	1980s	Proto-industrialisation in western India; long eighteenth century framework
John F. Richards	1990, 1993	Synthetic: Habib's agrarian, Ali's jagirdari, Chandra's factional, and Alam's regional readings are interlocking rather than competing
Andrea Hintze	1997	Integrative social-power framework; multiple crises as expressions of broader transformation
Munis Faruqui	2012	Princely politics as a distinct but related register of the same imperial unravelling

The positions listed are not strictly incompatible. In current practice, most scholars treat Habib's extraction-rate reading as the structural backbone, accept Alam's regional-variegation argument as a necessary correction to any uniform-collapse account, take Chandra on factional politics as the proximate mechanism of the post-Aurangzeb succession, and place Richards's synthetic reading at the framing level. The revisionist critique associated with Bayly, Subrahmanyam, and Perlin is generally treated as a correction to the scope of the crisis claim rather than to its evidentiary base.

== Legacy in Mughal decline literature ==
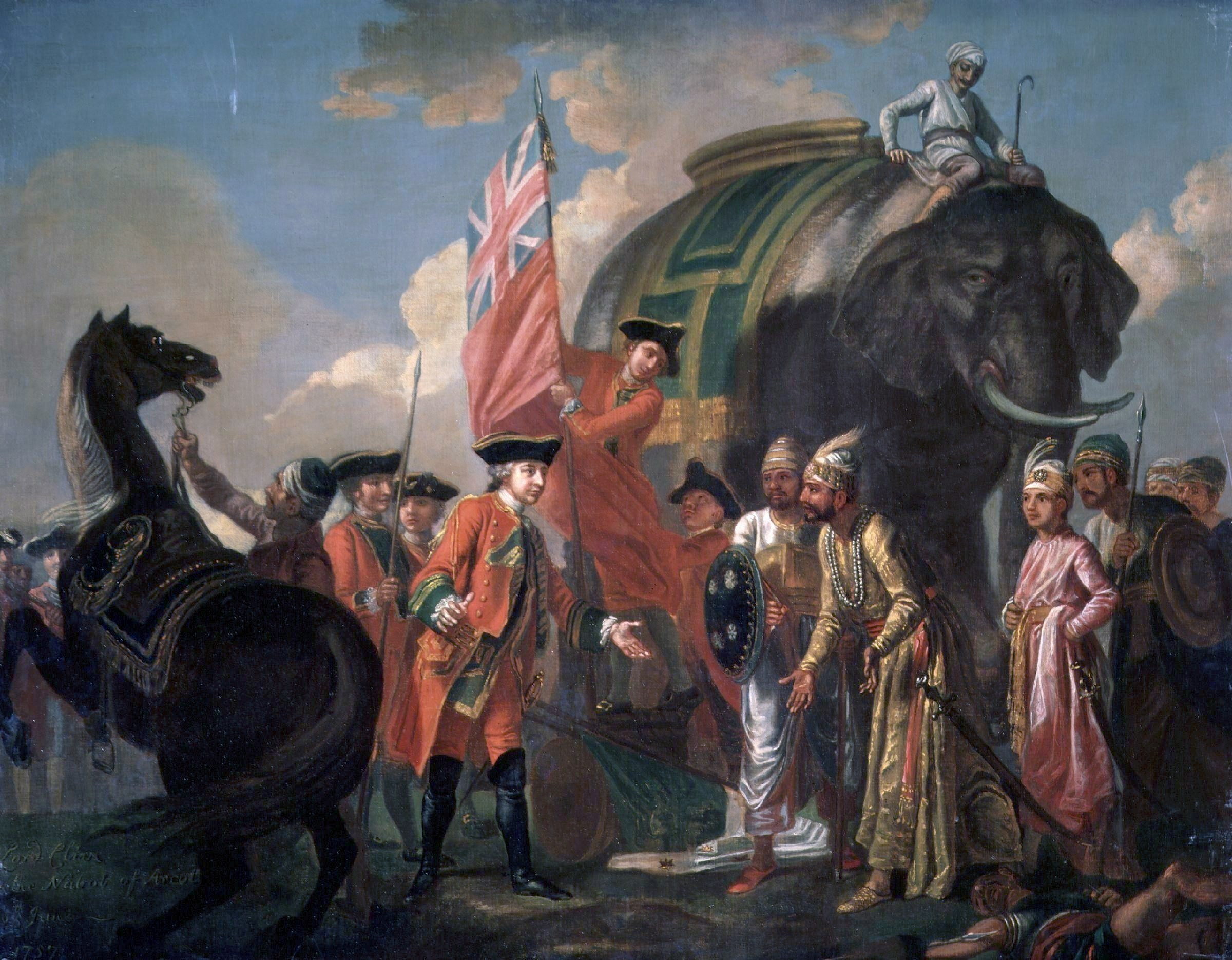
Robert Clive meeting Mir Jafar after the Battle of Plassey in 1757, painted by Francis Hayman c. 1762. The transfer of the Bengal diwani to the East India Company in 1765 marked the point at which the chronic crisis had resolved into a new political order.

The agrarian crisis occupies a central place in modern accounts of the decline of the Mughal Empire. It supplies the causal hinge between the institutional maturity of the mature imperial system, the administrative and military apparatus of Akbar, Shah Jahan, and early Aurangzeb, and the fragmented political order of the half-century before Plassey. Most recent textbook and research-level accounts of the decline of the Mughal Empire, in Indian, British, and American teaching, treat the agrarian crisis as part of a cluster with the jagirdari crisis and the factional politics of the post-Aurangzeb court, and date the chronic phase to the 1680s onward with acute fiscal collapse in the 1730s.

The category has also influenced comparative early-modern historiography. Richards's 1990 essay in Modern Asian Studies situated the Mughal case in the wider "seventeenth-century crisis" debate in European and world history, and scholars of the Ottoman timar system, of Safavid Iran's iqta and tuyul arrangements, and of the late Ming Chinese fiscal system have used the Mughal agrarian crisis as a comparative reference point. The comparison is not of simple parallel collapse; the timing, mechanisms, and outcomes differ significantly across the cases. What the comparison illuminates is the characteristic vulnerability of early-modern agrarian states whose military and service demands outgrew their extractive capacity.

The Mughal case differs from the Ottoman and Ming comparanda in at least three respects that affect the usefulness of the comparison. First, the timing is later: the Ottoman timar crisis is typically dated to the late sixteenth century, the Ming fiscal collapse to the 1620s and 1630s, while the Mughal chronic phase runs from roughly 1680 to 1739. Second, the mechanism of rotation in the Mughal jagir system differs from the Ottoman timar and the Safavid tuyul in ways that Habib treated as consequential: the Mughal jagir was rotated deliberately and frequently, while the timar and the tuyul had stronger tendencies toward hereditary retention. Third, the outcome was distinct: in the Ottoman case, the empire survived its seventeenth-century crisis with a transformed fiscal apparatus; in the Ming case, a dynastic change resolved the crisis with continuity of imperial form; in the Mughal case, the imperial structure was succeeded by a plurality of regional states rather than being reconstituted.

The agrarian crisis has also entered comparative debates on the economic prehistory of British rule in India. Nationalist historiography in the early twentieth century, notably in the work of Romesh Chunder Dutt and later writers, had ascribed Indian economic weakness at the time of British conquest to the fiscal and agrarian legacies of late Mughal rule. Habib's 1963 thesis, while methodologically distinct from that tradition, supplied a scholarly account that made it possible to describe a pre-colonial Indian economic crisis without relying on the colonial-period narrative of timeless village stagnation. Revisionist scholarship from the 1980s subsequently complicated both the Habib and the colonial narratives, suggesting that the economic setting into which British rule expanded was more varied and in parts considerably more dynamic than either earlier account had allowed.

The category has been disputed in its detail and refined in its application, but it has not been displaced in the literature. The continuing centrality of the agrarian crisis in scholarly debates on Mughal India reflects both the depth of the archival evidence that Habib assembled for it and the persistence of its explanatory power for the transition from imperial to regional political order in the subcontinent.

In undergraduate and postgraduate teaching, the agrarian crisis remains a set topic in courses on medieval and early-modern Indian history at most major Indian universities, including the University of Delhi, Jawaharlal Nehru University, and Aligarh Muslim University, and in South Asian studies programmes at Cambridge, Oxford, SOAS London, Columbia, and Duke. The term appears in the Indian civil service examination syllabi as a named concept under the "Medieval India" section of the history paper and in the teaching packs produced by the Indira Gandhi National Open University for distance learners. Its continuing pedagogical visibility has tended to reinforce rather than displace the centrality of Habib's original framework in subsequent scholarship.

== See also ==
- Mughal Empire
- Decline of the Mughal Empire
- Jagirdari crisis
- Economy of the Mughal Empire
- Mughal successor states
- Irfan Habib
- Zamindar
- Zabt
- Jagir
- Mansabdar

== Sources ==
Modern scholarship

- Alam, Muzaffar (1986). The Crisis of Empire in Mughal North India: Awadh and Punjab, 1707–48. Delhi: Oxford University Press. OCLC 14068225.
- Ali, M. Athar (1968) [1966]. The Mughal Nobility under Aurangzeb (revised ed.). Bombay: Asia Publishing House.
- Bayly, C. A. (1988). Indian Society and the Making of the British Empire. The New Cambridge History of India, II.1. Cambridge: Cambridge University Press. ISBN 978-0-521-38650-0.
- Blake, Stephen P. (1991). Shahjahanabad: The Sovereign City in Mughal India, 1639–1739. Cambridge: Cambridge University Press. ISBN 978-0-521-39045-3.
- Chandra, Satish (2002) [1959]. Parties and Politics at the Mughal Court, 1707–1740 (4th ed.). New Delhi: Oxford University Press. ISBN 978-0-19-565444-8.
- Faruqui, Munis D. (2012). The Princes of the Mughal Empire, 1504–1719. Cambridge: Cambridge University Press. ISBN 978-1-107-02217-1.
- Gommans, Jos (2002). Mughal Warfare: Indian Frontiers and High Roads to Empire, 1500–1700. London: Routledge.
- Habib, Irfan (2013) [1963]. The Agrarian System of Mughal India 1556–1707 (3rd ed.). New Delhi: Oxford University Press. ISBN 978-0-19-807742-8.
- Hintze, Andrea (1997). The Mughal Empire and Its Decline: An Interpretation of the Sources of Social Power. Aldershot: Ashgate. ISBN 978-0-86078-611-5.
- Leonard, Karen (1979). "The 'Great Firm' Theory of the Decline of the Mughal Empire" (PDF). Comparative Studies in Society and History. 21 (2): 151–167. doi:10.1017/S0010417500012792. JSTOR 178445.
- Moosvi, Shireen (1987). The Economy of the Mughal Empire, c. 1595: A Statistical Study. Delhi: Oxford University Press. ISBN 978-0-19-561765-8.
- Raychaudhuri, Tapan; Habib, Irfan, eds. (1982). The Cambridge Economic History of India, Volume 1: c. 1200 – c. 1750. Cambridge: Cambridge University Press.
- Richards, John F. (1990). "The Seventeenth-Century Crisis in South Asia". Modern Asian Studies. 24 (4): 625–638. doi:10.1017/S0026749X00010611. JSTOR 312759.
- Richards, John F. (1993). The Mughal Empire. The New Cambridge History of India, I.5. Cambridge: Cambridge University Press. ISBN 978-0-521-56603-2.
- Siddiqi, Noman Ahmad (1970). Land Revenue Administration under the Mughals (1700–1750). Bombay: Asia Publishing House. OCLC 122742.

Primary sources

- Abu'l-Fazl 'Allami (1873–1894). The Ain-i-Akbari. Translated by Blochmann, Henry; Jarrett, Henry Sullivan. Calcutta: Asiatic Society of Bengal.
- Irvine, William (1922). Sarkar, Jadunath (ed.). Later Mughals. Calcutta: M. C. Sarkar.
- Khafi Khan, Muhammad Hashim (1877). Muntakhabu-l Lubab. Translated by Elliot, Henry Miers; Dowson, John.
- Saqi Mustaid Khan (1947). Ma'asir-i-'Alamgiri. Translated by Sarkar, Jadunath. Calcutta: Royal Asiatic Society of Bengal.
