= Muzaffar Alam =

University of Chicago professor of South Asian Languages and Civilizations (born 1947)

- Born: 3 February 1947 (age 79)
- Education: Aligarh Muslim University; Jawaharlal Nehru University; Jamia Millia Islamia
- Scientific career
- Fields: History

Muzaffar Alam (born 3 February 1947) is the George V. Bobrinskoy Professor in South Asian Languages and Civilizations at the University of Chicago.

== Biography ==
Muzaffar Alam is a historian trained at Jamia Millia Islamia (New Delhi), Aligarh Muslim University and Jawaharlal Nehru University (New Delhi), where he obtained his doctorate in history in 1977. Before joining the SALC at the University of Chicago in 2001, he taught three decades at the Centre for Historical Studies, Jawaharlal Nehru University, and has held visiting positions in the Collège de France (Paris), Leiden University, University of Wisconsin–Madison, and the EHESS (Paris).

== Research ==
Alam's research focuses on Mughal political and institutional history and the history of Indo-Islamic culture. Alam has taught courses on the history of the Delhi Sultanate and the Mughal Empire. His working languages include English, Persian, French, and Urdu.

Alam also studies the history of religious and literary cultures in pre-colonial northern India, history of Indo-Persian travel accounts, and comparative history of the Islamic world (as seen from an Indian perspective).

== Publications ==
=== Monographs ===
- The Crisis of Empire in Mughal North India (Delhi: Oxford University Press, 1986)
- The Mughal State 1526-1750 (edited with Sanjay Subrahmanyam) (Delhi: Oxford University Press, 1998)
- A European Experience of the Mughal Orient (with Seema Alavi) (Delhi: Oxford University Press, 2001)
- The Languages of Political Islam in India: c. 1200-1800 (Chicago: The University of Chicago Press, 2004)
- Indo-Persian Travels in the Age of Discovery: 1400-1800 (With Sanjay Subrahmanyam) (Cambridge: Cambridge University Press, 2007)
- Writing the Mughal World: Studies on Culture and Politics (With Sanjay Subrahmanyam) (New York: Columbia University Press, 2011)
- The Mughals and the Sufis: Islam and Political Imagination in India, 1500-1750 (Albany: SUNY Press, 2021)

=== Contributions ===
- "Assimilation from a Distance: Confrontation and Sufi Accommodation in Awadh Society," in R. Champakalakshmi and S. Gopal (eds.) Tradition, Dissent and Ideology: Essays in Honour of Romila thapar, Delhi: Oxford University Press, 1996.
- "Shari`a and Governance in Indo-Islamic Context," in David Gilmartin and Bruce B. Lawrence (eds.), Beyond Turk and Hindu: Rethinking Religious Identities in Islamicate South Asia, Gainesville: University Press of Florida, 2000.
- "The Culture and Politics of Persian in Precolonial Hindustan," in Sheldon Pollock (ed.), Literary Cultures in History: Reconstructions from South Asia, Berkeley: University of California Press, 2003.
- "The Afterlife of a Mughal Masnavi: The Tale of Nal and Daman in Urdu and Persian," (with S. Subrahmanyam), in Kathryn Hansen and David Lelyveld (eds.), A Wilderness of Possibilities: Urdu Studies in Transnational Perspective, Delhi: Oxford University Press, 2005, pp. 46-73.
