= George V. Bobrinskoy =

Russian-American linguistic scholar

George Vladimir Bobrinskoy
- Георгий Владимир Бобринской
- Born: Count Grigori Wladimirovich Bobrinsky; January 23, 1901; Tula, Russian Empire
- Died: November 17, 1985 (aged 84); Hyde Park, Illinois, United States
- Education: Philadelphia Lutheran Seminary (BA) Yale University (MA)
- Occupation: Professor
- Children: 2

George Vladimir Bobrinskoy (Russian: Гео́ргий Влади́мирович Бо́бринский; 23 January 1901 – 17 November 1985) was a Russian-born American Sanskritist. He was professor emeritus in the departments of linguistics, Slavic languages and South Asian literature and civilization at the University of Chicago.

== Early life ==
George V. Bobrinskoy was born on 23 January 1901 in Tula, Russia as Count Grigory Vladimirovich Bobrinskiy. He was a "left-hand" descendant of the Russian empress Catherine the Great. After the Russian Revolution he left his country at the end of the Civil war, fighting in the ranks of the Preobrajensky Guards regiment. After a short stay in Novi Sad in Serbia, he immigrated to the United States in 1923.

Bobrinskoy resumed his undergraduate studies at the Philadelphia Lutheran Seminary, earning his BA in 1926. Then he went to Yale University and studied Sanskrit under Franklin Edgerton. In 1927 he joined the “Department of Comparative Philology, General Linguistics, and Indo-Iranian Philology” at University of Chicago as the “Instructor in Sanskrit”. In the academic year 1929-30, he was promoted to Assistant Professor of Sanskrit of the department.

During the Second World War, the University of Chicago was selected as a Center for Russian language and area instruction under the Army Specialized Training Program. After the death of Samuel Northrup Harper the chairman of the Russian department in January 1943, Bobrinskoy his associate was asked to head the Russian-language program.

After the war he was chairman of the department of linguistics from 1951 to 1966 and dean of students in the humanities division from 1954 to 1967.

== Personal life ==
Bobrinskoy was married to the civic leader Theodora P. Bobrinskoy with a son George V. Bobrinskoy Jr. and a daughter Theodora Bobrinskoy Shepherd. At University of Chicago he was also the tennis champion of the Quadrangle Club until beaten by Ignace Jay Gelb.
