= Zat =

Zat or similar can mean:

- Zat, Iran, a village in Iran
- Zat, a rank in the Mansabdar system of the Mughal Empire
- zat, ISO 639-3 language code for Tabaá Zapotec, a Zapotec language
- ZAT, IATA code for Zhaotong Airport in China
- ZAT, abbreviation of Zariba of All Territory, a fictional organization in Ultraman Taro
- ZAT (Ukrainian: Закрите акціонерне товариство), a former type of legal entity in Ukraine
