= Satish Chandra =

Satish Chandra is a given name of Hindu origin, and may refer to,

- Satish Chandra (politician) (1917–1990), Indian National Congress leader
- Satish Chandra (historian) (1922–2017), Indian academic
- Satish Chandra (diplomat) (fl. 1960s–1990s), Indian diplomat
- Satish Chandra Agarwal (1928–1997), Indian politician
- Satish Chandra Basumatary (1901–1974), Indian Bodo-language writer
- Satish Chandra Dubey (born 1975), Indian politician
- Satish Chandra Kakati (1912–2006), Indian journalist
- Satish Chandra Maheshwari (1933–2019), Indian botanist
- Satish Chandra Mukherjee (1865–1948), Indian educationist
- Satish Chandra Roy (1941–2026), Bangladeshi politician
- Satish Chandra Samanta (1900–1983), Indian politician
- Satish Chandra Sharma (born 1961), Indian judge
- Satish Chandra Vidyabhusan (1870–1920), Indian academic
