= M. Athar Ali =

Indian writer and historian (1925–1998)

- Born: 18 January 1925; India
- Died: 7 July 1998 (aged 73); Aligarh
- Education: Aligarh Muslim University
- Occupations: Historian, teacher
- Known for: Books on medieval Indian history, president of The Indian History Congress
- Spouse: Feroza Khatoon
- Children: 7
- Awards: Wilson Fellow (Smitsomian, 1986); Smuts Fellow (Cambridge, 1974–75); National Fellow (ICHR, 1990–1993); Barpujari award (1986)

M. Athar Ali (18 January 1925 – 7 July 1998) was an Indian historian of medieval Indian history. Throughout his career, he was known for his strong stance against Hindu and Islamic extremism. He was a professor at the Centre for Advanced Studies in Medieval History at his alma mater, Aligarh Muslim University. He is considered to be a Marxist historian.

== Early life ==
M. Athar Ali was the son of Rehmat Ali. He was born in Pilakhna in Aligarh District, Uttar Pradesh, India. He was married to Feroza Kahtoon and had seven children. His oldest son, Taimur Athar is a renowned research scientist at the Indian Institute of Chemical Technology in Hyderabad, Telangana.

== Career ==
Ali was educated at Aligarh Muslim University (AMU) where he was a student of Mohammad Habib, Nurul Hasan and S. A. Rashid. He earned his doctorate there in 1961 under the supervision of Satish Chandra. He started his career in research and teaching when he joined AMU as a research assistant. He and a fellow historian, Irfan Habib, joined AMU's Department of History at around the same time in 1953. He became Professor in 1978. He retired in 1990 after a five-year period of re-employment.

Ali wrote extensively on the Mughal Empire, comparative history of Islamic empires, implications of secularism and early modern societies from Spain to Indonesia. His reputation for scholarship was firmly established in 1966, with the publication of his book, The Mughal Nobility Under Aurangazeb. A paperback edition was published in 1970 and a second, revised, edition in 1997. Originally his doctoral thesis, it was soon acknowledged as the definitive study of India's late medieval ruling class. The book led to a reconsideration of many standard views of the ethnic composition of the Mughal ruling class and was widely regarded as a strong critique of communalist historiography in India and Pakistan. It also offered, for the first time, a more scientific and rational analysis of Aurangazeb the person, and the historical role of Aurangazeb, the last of the great Mughal emperors, whose reign between 1658 and 1707 hastened the disintegration of the empire. The theory, which still receives support from many quarters, that Aurangazeb's "religious bias" generated a "Hindu backlash" which brought about the downfall of the empire, was challenged by Ali on the basis of hard evidence. "The evidence I assembled," wrote Ali in his introduction to the revised edition of the book, "did not in any sense exonerate Aurangazeb, but I think it did set different limits within which the Emperor's personal preferences and decisions had impact: and it suggested a number of other factors, besides the one of religious bias..."

In 1985, Ali published his second major work, The Apparatus of Empire: Awards of Ranks, Offices and Titles to the Mughal Nobility, 1574-1658. This is a crucial reference tool for historians concerned with that period. In his introduction to the work's extensive tables, Ali demonstrated how the quantitative data obtained from them could tell the reader the internal processes of the Mughal polity. He had largely completed his compilation of similar data on Aurangazeb's reign (1659–1707) for a second volume.

Ali died of liver cancer on 7 July 1998.

== Political views ==
Ali was a secularist who strongly opposed all forms of religious extremism. He strenuously opposed the communal perception of history. He was one of the four authors (the others were R.S Sharma, D.N. Jha and Suraj Bhan) of the Report to the Nation on the Babri Masjid, Ayodhya, 1990, which was published in many Indian languages. Dismissing, on the basis of an examination of the written and archaeological evidence, the claim that the Babri Masjid occupied the site of Rama's birth or that a temple occupied the site and it was pulled down to construct the masjid, the Report ended with the impassioned appeal: "If, then, we have a care for historical facts, if we want to uphold the law, if we have love for our own cultural heritage, we must protect the Babri Masjid. A country is surely judged by how it treats its past."

To oppose the source of a dangerous communalist subversion of the nation, Ali did not disdain activist positions. His support for the well-known anti-communal organisation Sahmat (Safdar Hashmi Memorial Trust) was firm and unqualified.

== Works ==
- The Mughal Nobility Under Aurangzeb, 1966, OUP, ISBN 9780195655995
- The Apparatus of Empire: Awards of Ranks, Offices and Titles to the Mughal Nobility, 1574-1658, 1985, ISBN 9780195615005
- The Perception of India in Akbar and Abu'l Fazl" in Akbar and His India, Oxford University Press, New Delhi,1997
- Mughal India. Studies in Polity, Ideas, Society and Culture, Oxford University Press, 2008, ISBN 978-0-19-569661-5
