= The General Crisis =

Period of global instability (1600s–1700s)

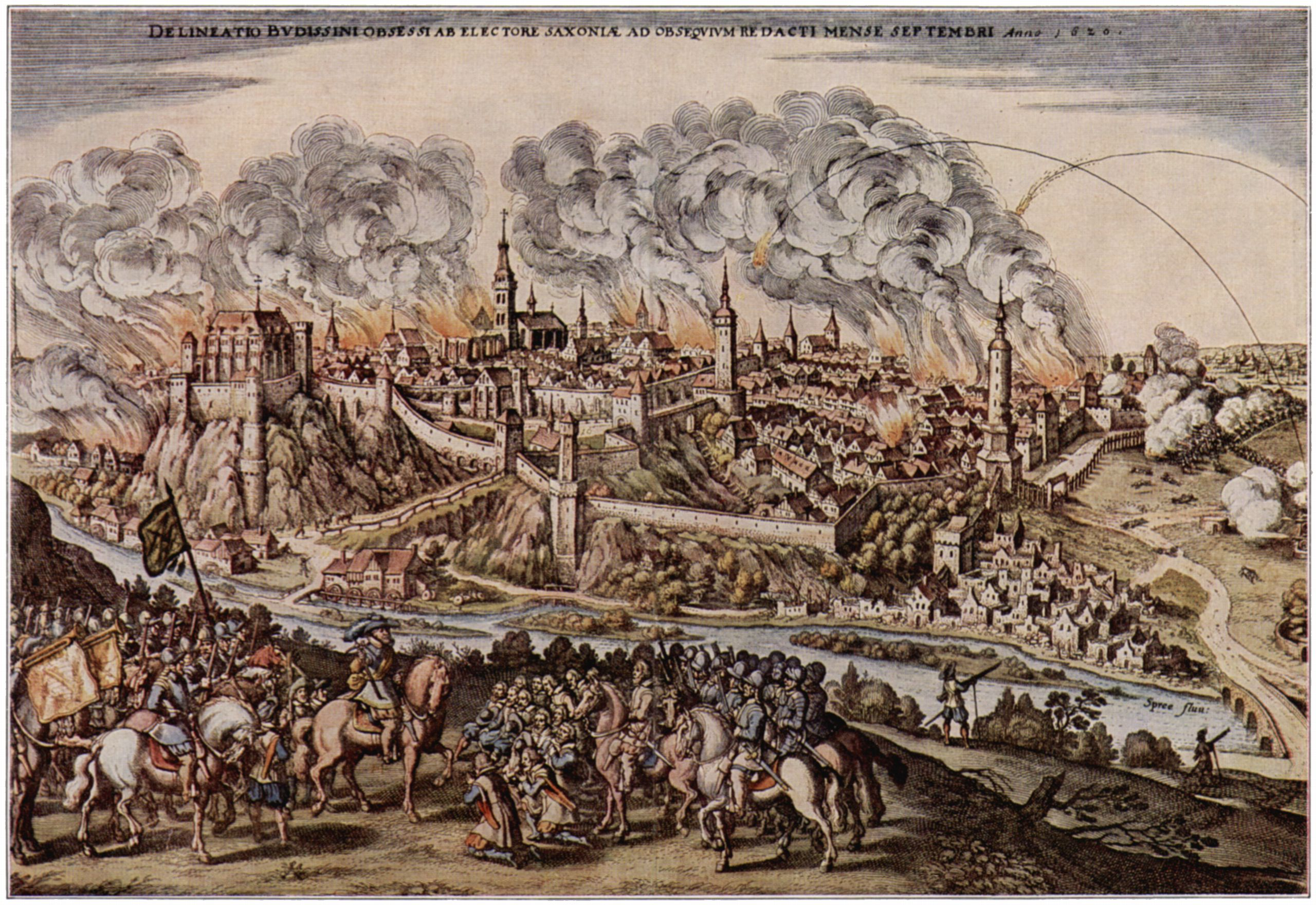
The siege of Bautzen, during the Thirty Years' War (1618–1648) which devastated much of Europe, is one of the events some historians have associated with the alleged General Crisis.

The General Crisis is a term used by some historians to describe an alleged period of widespread regional conflict and instability that occurred from the early 17th century to the early 18th century in Europe, and in more recent historiography in the world at large.

The concept of a general 17th-century crisis was, by 1990, thought by historian Niels Steensgaard to be part of a superseded historiographic debate lasting from 1954 to 1978.

== Definitions and debates ==
Since the mid-20th century, some scholars have proposed widely different definitions, causes, events, periodisations and geographical applications of a 'General Crisis', disagreeing with each other in debates. Other scholars have rejected the various concepts of a General Crisis altogether, claiming there was no such generalised phenomenon connecting various events due to a lack of linkeages between the events and widely shared commonalities in their character, and that generalised historical concepts such as the 'General Crisis' may be unhelpful in education.

=== Economic crisis in Europe ===
The origin of the concept stems from British Marxist historian Eric Hobsbawm in his pair of 1954 articles, "The Crisis of the Seventeenth Century", published in Past & Present. Hobsbawm regarded the 17th century as "a necessary phase of economic crisis required by the progress of modernity".

=== General Crisis in Western Europe ===
British conservative historian Hugh Trevor-Roper modified Hobsbawm's concept and coined the term 'General Crisis' in a 1959 article titled "The General Crisis of the Seventeenth Century", published in the same journal. Whereas Hobsbawm had discussed an economic crisis in Europe, Trevor-Roper saw a wider crisis, "a crisis in the relations between society and the State".

Trevor-Roper argued that the middle years of the 17th century in Western Europe saw a widespread breakdown in politics, economics and society caused by a complex series of demographic, religious, economic and political problems. In the "general crisis", various events such as the English Civil War, the Fronde in France, the climax of the Thirty Years' War in the Holy Roman Empire and revolts against the Spanish Crown in Portugal, Naples and Catalonia were all manifestations of the same problem.

The most important cause of the "general crisis", in Trevor-Roper's opinion, was the conflict between "Court" and "Country"; that is between the increasingly powerful centralising, bureaucratic, sovereign princely states represented by the court, and the traditional, regional, land-based aristocracy and gentry representing the country. He saw the intellectual and religious changes introduced by the Renaissance and the Protestant Reformation as important secondary causes of the "general crisis". Trevor-Roper argued that the 'violent socio-economic struggles and profound shifts in religious and intellectual values' of the 17th century were caused by the formation of modern nation-states.

=== General Crisis involving global climate change ===
Subsequent historians interested in the General Crisis include Geoffrey Parker, who has authored multiple books on the subject. Initially, Parker (1997) broadly followed the concept of Trevor-Roper, but in 2013 he expanded the concept to argue there was a global General Crisis, exacerbated by the global climate change known as the "Little Ice Age".

There were various controversies regarding the "general crisis" thesis between historians. Some simply denied the existence of any such crisis. For instance, Hobsbawm saw the problems of 17th-century Europe as being social and economic in origin, an emphasis that Trevor-Roper would not concede. Instead, he theorised that the 'General Crisis' was a crisis of state and society, precipitated by the expansion of bureaucratic offices in the sixteenth century. Unlike the other two, Parker put an emphasis on climate change.

== Proposed patterns ==
Some historians such as Hobsbawm, Trevor-Roper, and Parker, have argued the 17th century was an era of crisis, although they differed about the nature of this crisis. Today there are scholars who promote the crisis model, arguing it provides an invaluable insight into the warfare, politics, economics, and even art of the seventeenth century. The Thirty Years' War (1618–1648) focused attention on the massive horrors that wars could bring to entire populations.

The 1640s in particular saw more state breakdowns around the world than any previous or subsequent period. The Polish–Lithuanian Commonwealth, the largest state in Europe, temporarily disappeared. In addition, there were secessions and upheavals in several parts of the Spanish Empire. In Britain there were rebellions in every part of the Stuart monarchy (Kingdom of England, Kingdom of Scotland, Kingdom of Ireland, and British America).

Political insurgency and a spate of popular revolts shook the foundations of most states in Europe and Asia. More wars took place around the world in the mid-17th century than in almost any other period of recorded history. The crises spread far beyond Europe; for example Ming China, the most populous state in the world, collapsed.

China's Ming dynasty and Japan's Tokugawa shogunate had radically different economic, social, and political systems. However, they experienced a series of crises during the mid-17th century that were at once interrelated and strikingly similar to those occurring in other parts of the world at the same time. Frederic Wakeman argues that the crisis which destroyed the Ming dynasty was partly a result of the climatic change as well as China's already significant involvement in the developing world economy. Bureaucratic dishonesty worsened the problem. The Qing dynasty's success in dealing with the crisis made it more difficult for it to consider alternative responses when confronted with severe challenges from the West in the 19th century.

=== Climate change ===
The General Crisis overlaps fairly neatly with the Little Ice Age whose peak some authorities locate in the 17th century. Of particular interest is the overlap with the Maunder Minimum, El Niño events and an abnormal spate of volcanic activity. Climatologists such as David Rind and Jonathan Overpeck have hypothesised that the three events are interlinked. Across the Northern Hemisphere, the mid-17th century experienced almost unprecedented death rates. Geoffrey Parker has suggested that environmental factors may have been in part to blame, especially the global cooling trend of this period. David D. Zhang et al provide a detailed analysis here.

=== Demographic decline ===
During this period there was a significant decline in populations particularly in Europe and China. The cause for this demographic decline is complicated and significantly unproven. Parker claims that war, climate change and migration are the main factors that contributed to this population crisis. War ravaged Europe for almost the entirety of the century, with no major state avoiding war in the 1640s. Some states saw very few years of peace. For example, Poland only saw 27 years of peace, the Dutch Republic 14, France 11, and Spain only 3.

An example of the impact of war on demography in Europe is Germany, whose population was reduced by approximately 15% to 30% in the Thirty Years' War. Another factor for the demographic decline in Europe was the spate of climatic events that dramatically affected the food supply and caused major crop failure in the marginal farmland of Europe. During this period there was a drop of 1–2 °C, which coincides with the Maunder Minimum and frequent, large spates of volcanism which acted to drop temperatures enough to cause crop failures in Europe.

Crop failures were met with a wave of urban migration that perpetuated unsustainable urban populations and caused in some areas a Malthusian crisis. Although in some areas the early stages of the subsistence crises were not necessarily Malthusian in nature, the result usually followed this model of agricultural deficit in relation to population.

=== Conflicts and wars ===
Examples which have been given for general crisis and state breakdown during this period include:

- The Kipper und Wipper, an economic crisis in the Holy Roman Empire (1619–1623)

== Criticism ==
No consensus on the occurrence of a general crisis has been established amongst scholars. Some scholars contend that the arguments in favour of a 'general crisis' in the 17th century do not stand up under scrutiny. For example, Danish historian Niels Steensgaard (1978) pointed out that the Dutch Republic was enjoying an economic expansion – known as the Dutch Golden Age – at the time of the alleged crisis. Anthony F. Upton argued in 2001 that violent popular protests were endemic in European societies, and such violent unrest was "generally directed at specific local problems, and did not challenge the legitimacy of the established order".

Although protests in the 1630s and 1640s "rose to unusual levels" in some regions, Upton wrote: "Historians have attempted to see in the wave of unrest a 'general crisis', and the debate on this continues. The main factors arguing against linkage are the reality that the disorders remained specific to local circumstances, even where they coincided in time: they did not coalesce into broader movements. Above all, the demands of the rebels did not challenge the legitimacy of the rulers, but sought restoration of customary norms".

Upton claimed that very few actually challenged monarchy as an institution, although many nobles preferred a different dynasty with themselves in power. For example, the Portuguese Restoration War (1640–1668) simply sought to replace the House of Habsburg with the House of Braganza. Almost all of the French princes leading the Fronde (1648–1653) were horrified by the execution of Charles I in 1649, which they regarded as regicide; unlike the majority of English Parliamentarians, they never became republicans.

Victor Lieberman argued in 2003, later corroborated by Geoff Wade and Chris Baker and Pasuk Phongpaichit, that Anthony Reid's "Age of Commerce" Thesis, using Maritime Southeast Asia during the "General Crisis" as a framework to explain Mainland Southeast Asia at this same time, failed to properly address the increased political and economic consolidation and high economic growth of the Southeast Asian mainland states (Siam, Burma, Vietnam) during the 17th through 19th centuries, whose trade connections with China, it has been argued, negated any possible effects of the European departure from the region during the 17th and 18th centuries; therefore the region experienced a relatively calm 17th century in comparison to contemporary regions.

In 2000, Denis Shemilt used the terms "Industrial Revolution" and especially "General Crisis" as examples of historiographical concepts that are easy to teach adolescent schoolchildren, as they can easily make generalisations about seemingly unconnected events when tasked to do so. However, it will be harder for them to challenge the validity of such a generalised concept once they have been exposed to it, because that requires gathering detailed knowledge of all local events associated with the generalisation, and then judging whether they reasonably match up with it, or "to criticize the General Crisis concept as a category mistake, a promiscuous lumping together of phenomena more different than similar". Therefore, historians need to be careful in constructing such generalised concepts, so that the resulting narratives are not just meaningful and understandable, but also reasonably accurate.

== See also ==
- Crisis of the Late Middle Ages – a period of widespread social upheaval and rapid demographic shifts
  - Great Famine of 1315–1317
  - Black Death
- Decline of Spain

== Bibliography ==
- Aston, Trevor, ed. (1965), Crisis in Europe 1560–1660: Essays from Past and Present.
- Baker, Chris; Phongpaichit, Pasuk (2017). A History of Ayutthaya: Siam in the Early Modern World. Cambridge University Press. ISBN 978-1-316-64113-2.
- Hill, Christopher. (1961), The Century of the Revolution. W.W. Norton & Company Inc.ISBN 0393003655
- Lieberman, Victor (2003). Strange Parallels: Volume 1, Integration on the Mainland: Southeast Asia in Global Context, c.800–1830 (Studies in Comparative World History). ISBN 978-0521800860..
- Parker, Geoffrey; Smith, Lesley M, eds. (1997) [1978]. The General Crisis of the Seventeenth Century. Psychology Press. ISBN 9780203992609.
- Parker, Geoffrey (2008), "Crisis and Catastrophe: The Global Crisis of the Seventeenth Century Reconsidered", American Historical Review, 113 (4): 1053–79, doi:10.1086/ahr.113.4.1053.
- Parker, Geoffrey (2013), "Global Crisis: War, Climate Change & Catastrophe in the Seventeenth Century", Yale University Press.
- ——— (2010), "States Make War But Wars Also Break States" (PDF), Journal of Military History, 74 (1): 11–34.
- Rabb, Ted, ed. (1975), Struggle for Stability in Early Modern Europe.
- Trevor-Roper, Hugh (1959), "The General Crisis of the Seventeenth Century", Past and Present (16): 31–64, doi:10.1093/past/16.1.31.
