= Dahsala system =

Mughal Empire cash-based land revenue assessment introduced in 1580

The dahsala system (دہ سالہ, dah-sāla, /dɑːhˈsɑːlə/; dah-SAH-lə; literally "ten years") was a Mughal land-revenue assessment used across the central provinces of the empire from 1580. Devised by Akbar's chief revenue minister Raja Todar Mal, the system fixed the state's annual cash demand on cultivated land by averaging the recorded yields and prices of staple crops over a preceding ten-year period. The Persian word dahsala refers to that decade-long base on which the resulting assessment schedules, called dastur-ul-amal, were calculated.

The assessment formed the analytical core of the broader zabt revenue framework. Land was first measured with a standardised bigha based on the Ilahi gaz introduced under Akbar in 1573, then classified into four categories by the continuity of cultivation, after which a fixed cash rate per bigha for each crop was applied from a regional dastur schedule. Cultivators paid in rupees or dams rather than in kind, although the schedules were derived from a notional one-third share of the average produce.

Implementation followed years of preparation. The karori experiment of 1574 to 1582, supervised first by Khwaja Muzaffar Khan and then by Khwaja Shah Mansur, diwan from 1578 to 1581, gathered the village-level survey data on which Todar Mal built the dahsala settlement after his return to the diwani in 1582. The settlement applied to the imperial khalisa zabt zone of Lahore, Multan, Delhi, Agra, Awadh, Allahabad, and Malwa, was extended to Gujarat, and continued in adapted form under Jahangir, Shah Jahan, and Aurangzeb.

The detailed statistical record of dahsala assessments survives in the third book of Abu'l Fazl Allami's Ain-i-Akbari, compiled around 1595, which preserves per-bigha cash rates for dozens of crops across the imperial revenue circles. Modern interpretation of the system was opened by William Harrison Moreland in 1929 and recast by Irfan Habib in 1963 and Shireen Moosvi in 1987, both associated with the Aligarh school of historians at the Aligarh Muslim University.

== Etymology and terminology ==
The term dahsala is a Persian compound of dah ("ten") and sala ("year"), meaning "decennial" or "of ten years". It refers specifically to the ten-year base period from which the cash schedules were calculated rather than to any period for which an individual schedule remained in force. Once compiled, a dahsala schedule was treated as binding for the foreseeable future and was rarely revised on the same ten-year cycle.

Contemporary Mughal usage also referred to the system as Ain-i-Dahsala ("the dahsala regulation") or, less precisely, bandobast-i-dahsala ("the ten-year settlement"). Abu'l Fazl placed it within the wider category of zabt-i-har sala, the annual crop-rate assessment by which cash demand was fixed in advance of harvest.

In modern Indian and Western scholarship, the term sometimes denotes the assessment methodology specifically, and sometimes the entire revenue arrangement built on it, including land measurement, classification, collection, and the bureaucratic apparatus that operated it. The narrower usage, restricted to the ten-year cash-rate calculation that produced the dasturs, is the one followed by Habib and Moosvi and is adopted in this article. The broader administrative system within which the dahsala assessment operated is treated separately at zabt.

== Background ==
Sher Shah Suri (r. 1540–1545), whose Sur revenue arrangements provided the technical basis for Todar Mal's later dahsala assessment

=== Pre-Mughal precedents ===
A roughly comparable cash assessment had operated under the Suri administration of Sher Shah (r. 1540–1545) in the territory between the Indus and the upper Ganga. Sher Shah's officers measured the cultivable area using the sikandari gaz, a yard inherited from Sikandar Lodi, and classified each field into one of three quality grades. A notional one-third share of the average expected produce was then converted into a per-bigha cash rate calculated from prevailing market prices. Although his death in 1545 cut short the full extension of the system, its methodology survived in administrative memory and provided the working framework that Todar Mal, who began his career under the Surs in Bihar, later adapted for Akbar.

The early Mughals used less stable arrangements. Humayun's short and contested reign produced no settled cash assessment. Between Akbar's accession in 1556 and the consolidation of imperial control in the mid-1560s, the regent Bairam Khan and the early ministers relied on local agreements with intermediaries called zamindars, under which a lump sum was negotiated for each pargana and the actual rate per cultivator was left to local custom. The result was wide regional variation, frequent under-collection, and continuous bargaining over the demand.

=== Akbar's early reforms (1567–1573) ===
The first systematic Akbari reform was a thorough data-gathering effort. In 1567 the imperial diwan, Khwaja Muzaffar Khan, instructed the local revenue clerks (qanungos) to submit detailed returns on cultivated and uncultivated area in each pargana, the produce of each crop, and the prevailing market prices. These returns formed the statistical base on which subsequent assessments were built.

In 1573 Akbar standardised the linear unit of measurement. The Ilahi gaz, a yard of approximately 33 inches (84 cm), replaced the regionally varying cubits then in use, and the new bigha-i-Ilahi was defined as a square of sixty Ilahi gaz, equal to 3,600 square Ilahi gaz, or about 0.55 acres (0.22 ha). A measuring rod called the jarib, built from bamboo segments joined by iron rings, replaced the loose hempen rope used previously and held its length under varying weather, an innovation that improved the accuracy of village surveys.

=== The karori experiment (1574–1582) ===
In late 1574 Akbar reorganised revenue collection in the imperial khalisa lands between Lahore and Allahabad. The empire's most productive territory was divided into blocks each expected to yield one crore (ten million) of dams, and an officer called a karori was placed in charge of each block. The karori was responsible for measuring the land, recording the cropping pattern, supervising the harvest, and remitting the crore of dams demanded by the central treasury.

The experiment had two purposes. The first was to extract revenue more efficiently from territory previously held by jagirdars; the second was to compile, year by year, the village-level data on yields and prices needed for a longer-term assessment. Data flowed in steadily through the late 1570s, but the system proved administratively brittle. Many karoris extorted cultivators in order to meet the crore demand, while others embezzled. After Khwaja Shah Mansur replaced Muzaffar Khan as diwan in 1578, abuses became severe enough to threaten cultivated area in core districts. Shah Mansur was executed for treason in 1581, the karori arrangement was wound up in 1582, and Todar Mal returned to the diwani, where he applied the survey data the experiment had produced.

== Implementation ==
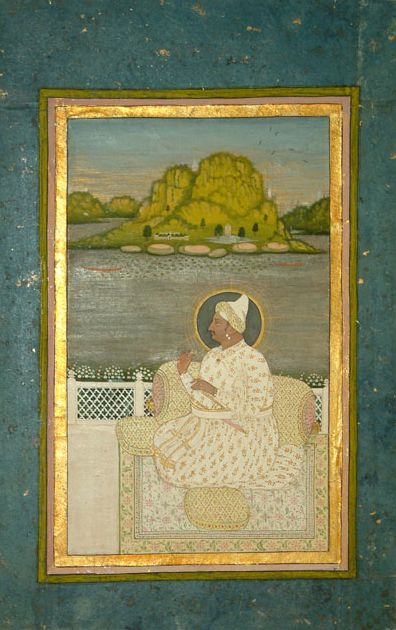
Raja Todar Mal, Akbar's chief revenue officer and architect of the dahsala settlement of 1580

=== Todar Mal's settlement ===
Raja Todar Mal, a Khatri accountant who had served Sher Shah before entering Mughal service in 1562, was given charge of imperial revenue administration in 1574, and again, after the karori failure, in 1582. The dahsala settlement, formally proclaimed in 1580 and extended steadily through the 1580s, applied his analysis of the karori-era survey data. For each pargana, the cultivated area of each crop, the yield in maunds per bigha, and the prevailing market prices over the years from 1570–71 to 1579–80 were averaged. From the resulting average yield, the state demanded one-third in kind, valued at the ten-year average price, and converted into a cash rate per bigha that was then entered into the dastur-ul-amal for that revenue circle.

The arithmetic was performed crop by crop and pargana by pargana. Habib's reconstruction emphasises that prevailing prices and yields were not crudely averaged from existing administrative figures: the data were re-derived from raw qanungo returns and from contemporary market reports, and only then averaged across the ten harvests. Once compiled, the dasturs were treated as fixed schedules unless extraordinary conditions warranted revision, and they remained substantially in force, with periodic adjustments, until the early eighteenth century.

=== Khwaja Shah Mansur's role ===
Although the dahsala system is associated with Todar Mal, the underlying field surveys were directed in part by Khwaja Shah Mansur during his diwani between 1578 and 1581. Shah Mansur extended the karori coverage, tightened audit procedures, and standardised the formats in which qanungos submitted their returns, all of which sharpened the data that subsequently fed the dasturs. His execution in 1581 has been read by Habib as ending a faction within the imperial bureaucracy that favoured very high revenue demand. The dahsala settlement under Todar Mal applied a more moderate rate.

== Methodology ==
=== Land measurement ===
Field measurement was the first stage of any dahsala assessment. In each village the patwari (village accountant) and the karori or his successor official measured every cultivated plot using the jarib, recording the area in bighas of the Ilahi standard. Uncultivated land was also surveyed and classified, although it carried no immediate revenue demand. The survey produced a written register listing each cultivator's plots and acreage that became the basis for assessment.

The standardisation of the bigha was significant for comparability across regions. Pre-Akbari units varied widely: a bigha in Bengal might be twice the size of one in Punjab. The Ilahi bigha gave the central treasury a single basis on which to compare productivity and aggregate revenue. Empire-wide adoption of the unit, although uneven in practice, was a precondition for the empire-wide dastur schedules.

=== Land categories ===
Cultivated and cultivable land was sorted into four categories defined by the continuity of cropping, set out by Abu'l Fazl in the third book of the Ain-i-Akbari.

Land categories under the dahsala system
Category	Definition	Revenue treatment
Polaj	Cultivated continuously every year	Full assessment at the dastur rate
Parauti	Left fallow temporarily to recover fertility	Full assessment in the years it was sown
Chachar	Left fallow for three to four years	Reduced assessment, rising progressively to full
Banjar	Uncultivated for five years or more	Concessional rates intended to encourage reclamation

Polaj and Parauti land, the most productive categories, were further graded into three quality classes by yield: nik (good), miyana (middling), and bad (poor). The applied cash rate combined the dastur for the crop with the multiplier appropriate to the land's classification.

=== Crop schedules and the dastur-ul-amal ===
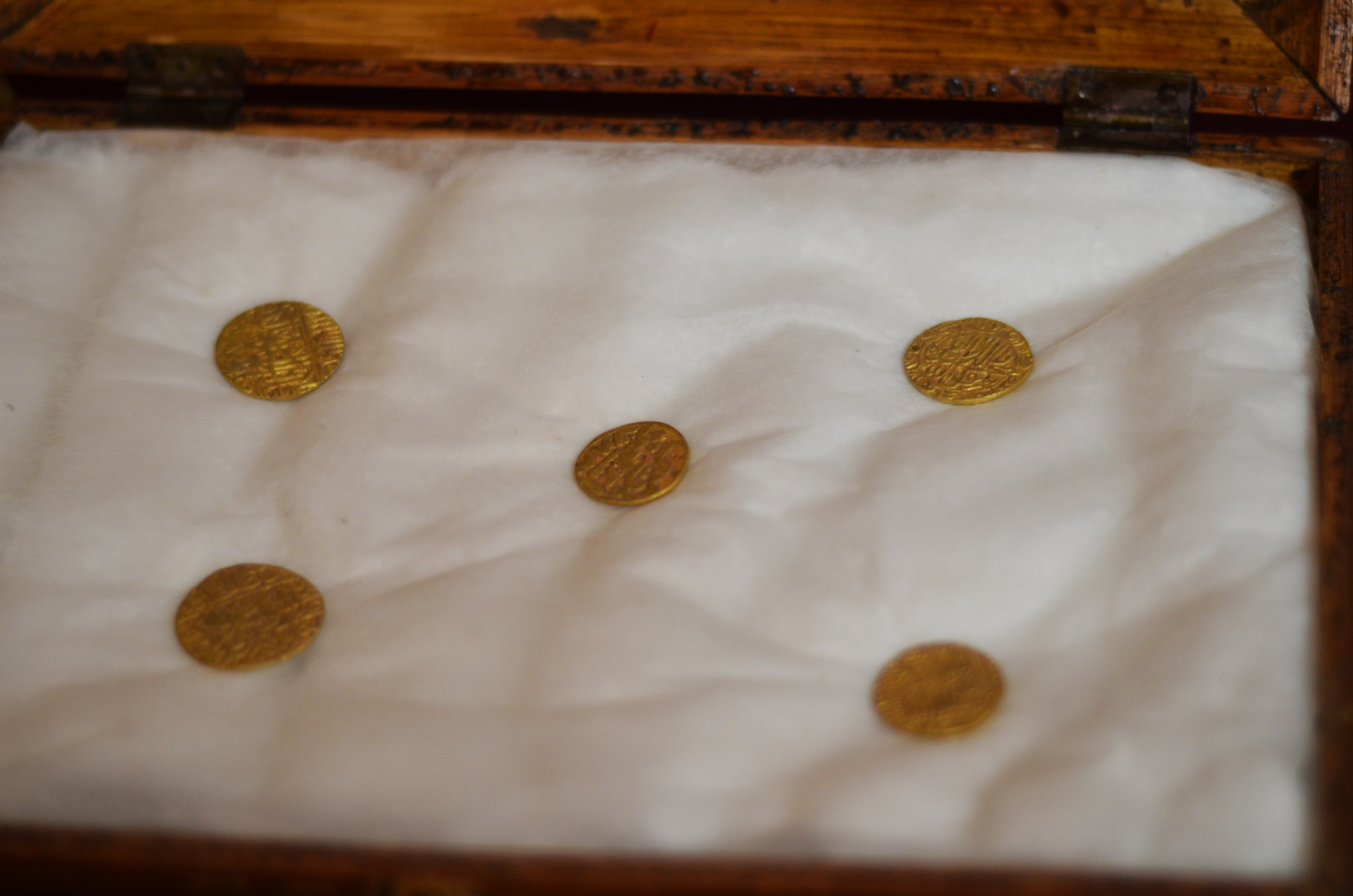
Mughal silver and copper coins of the sixteenth to eighteenth centuries. Dahsala assessments were paid in the silver rupee and the copper dam, valued by the imperial treasury at forty dams to the rupee.

The cash rates that gave the system its operational substance were entered into the dastur-ul-amal, a schedule maintained separately for each dastur or revenue circle. Each schedule listed the per-bigha cash demand for each crop grown locally; in core areas of the zabt zone the schedules covered roughly eighteen kharif and sixteen rabi crops, including wheat, barley, gram, oilseeds, cotton, indigo, sugar cane, and opium.

The compilation procedure was elaborate. For a given crop in a given dastur, the assessor took the average yield in maunds per bigha across the ten harvests, applied the state share of one-third, and multiplied by the ten-year average market price to obtain the cash demand per bigha. An earlier reading by Moreland in 1929 held that the ten-year averaging operated on a previously fixed cash schedule rather than on yields and prices directly. This interpretation was rejected by Habib in 1963 and has not survived in subsequent scholarship.

Once compiled, a dastur was treated as binding for the foreseeable future. Where conditions changed sharply, after a famine or a major shift in cropping pattern for example, the schedules were sometimes revised; but the surviving evidence in the Ain-i-Akbari from around 1595 shows the 1580 schedules largely intact fifteen years on.

After his accession to the throne, His Majesty made [it] his especial care to set in order the agriculture of the country and the welfare of the cultivators ... The lands which had any [previous] revenue assessment were placed under the dah-sala system, and where there was no previous jama they were placed under nasaq.

— Abu'l Fazl, Ain-i-Akbari, Book III, "Account of the Land Revenue", trans. H. S. Jarrett (1894).

=== State demand ===
The headline state share, one-third of the average produce, traced back to Sher Shah's settlement and was retained by Akbar. In practice the actual incidence varied widely. Where the dahsala dastur was applied accurately, the demand fell close to the nominal one-third; where karoris or their successors over-assessed, the burden could rise considerably higher; where the dasturs proved generous, particularly in Bengal and Sindh, the share fell below one-third. Quantitative work by Moosvi, drawing on the Ain-i-Akbari statistics for around 1595, finds an aggregate state demand on the order of one-half of the gross agricultural surplus in core Indo-Gangetic territory, with significant local variation.

== Geographic scope ==
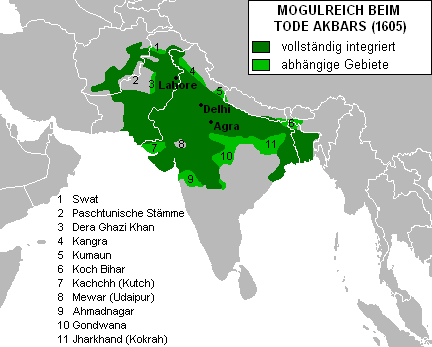
Mughal Empire at Akbar's death in 1605. The dahsala assessment applied principally in the imperial khalisa territory between Multan and Allahabad shown in dark green, and was extended to Gujarat after 1572.

The dahsala settlement applied principally to imperial khalisa land in the central provinces, the so-called zabt zone covering Lahore, Multan, Delhi, Agra, Awadh, Allahabad, and Malwa. It was extended to Gujarat after the Mughal annexation of 1572 and partially to Ajmer, although the rate structures in those territories drew on local pre-Mughal practice rather than on the standard zabt schedules.

The system did not extend to outlying provinces. In Bengal, Sindh, Berar, Khandesh, and Kashmir, Mughal authorities continued to rely on alternative methods. The principal alternatives were ghalla-bakshi (crop-sharing, in which the state and the cultivator divided the harvested produce in fixed proportions), kankut (a visual estimate of the standing crop), and nasaq (a lump-sum assessment based on past collections rather than on current measurement). Frontier and tribal areas, including the Deccan Plateau before its sixteenth-century absorption, were assessed under entirely separate revenue arrangements inherited from regional sultanates.

Within the zabt zone the application also varied between khalisa (crown land assessed and collected directly by imperial officers) and jagir (land assigned to mansabdars as the source of their salary). On khalisa, the dahsala dasturs were applied directly. On jagir, the assignee was nominally bound by the dasturs but in practice retained discretion over collection, an arrangement that contributed to the jagirdari crisis of the late seventeenth century.

== Primary sources ==
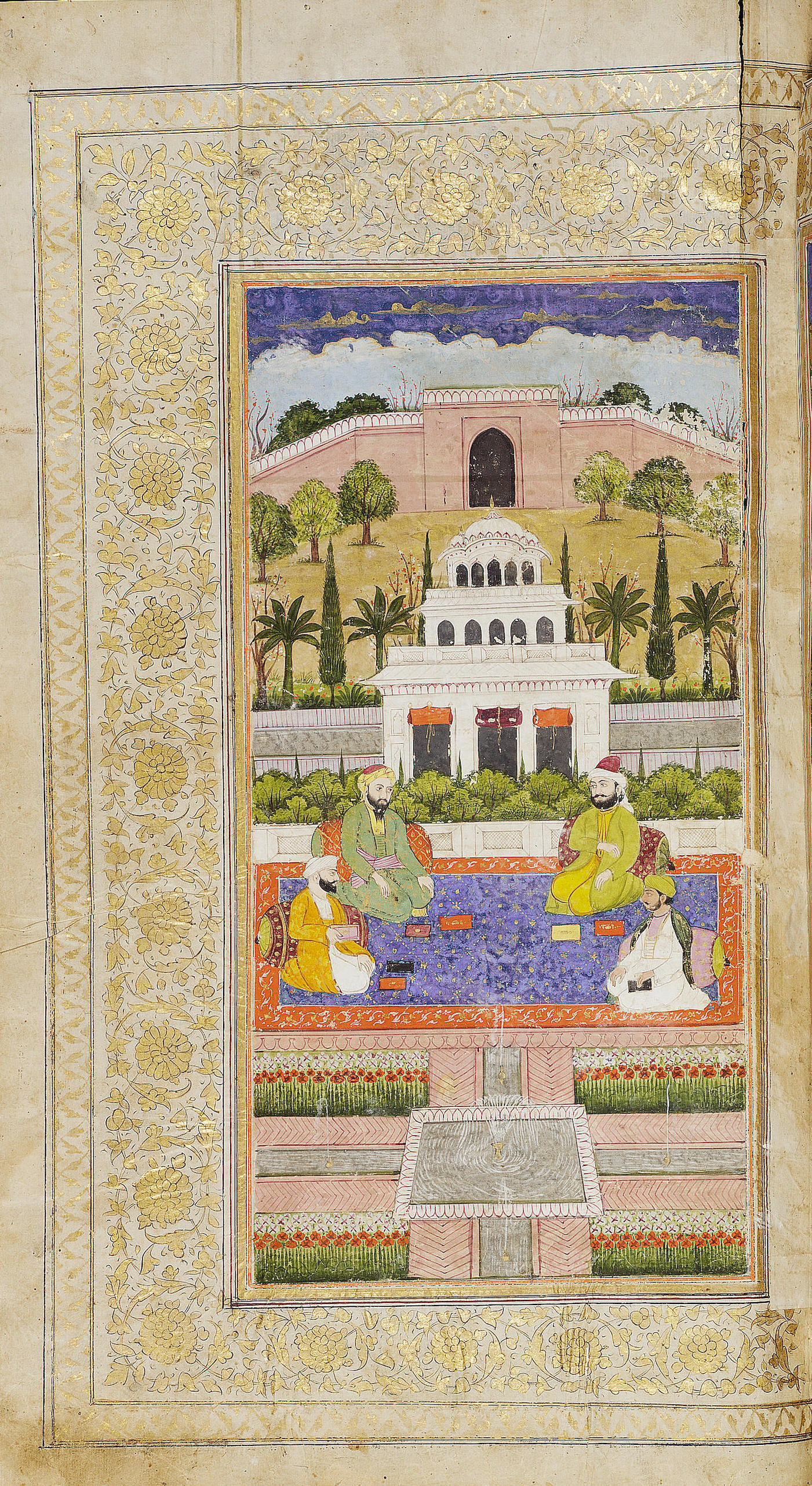
Abu'l Fazl Allami presenting the completed Akbarnama. The third book of his Ain-i-Akbari contains the principal contemporary record of the dahsala assessment.

The principal contemporary record of the dahsala system is the third book (daftar) of Abu'l Fazl Allami's Ain-i-Akbari, compiled around 1595 as part of the larger Akbarnama. The third book contains the regulations on land, the schedules of dasturs for each subah, statistical tables of yields and prices, and explanatory notes on the karori experiment and the rationale of the ten-year averaging.

The Ain-i-Akbari was translated into English in two stages. H. Blochmann produced volume one in 1873, covering the household and military regulations, and Henry Sullivan Jarrett produced the volume covering revenue and provincial gazetteer between 1891 and 1894. Jarrett's volume was revised by Jadunath Sarkar in 1949 and remains the standard English text. Both translations were issued by the Asiatic Society of Bengal in Calcutta and are now in the public domain.

Other contemporary chronicles supplement the Ain-i-Akbari. Nizamuddin Ahmad's Tabaqat-i-Akbari (completed 1593) records the political context of the karori reform, and Bada'uni's Muntakhab-ut-Tawarikh (completed 1596) preserves a sceptical commentary on imperial revenue policy from a Sunni cleric who served at Akbar's court.

== Impact ==
Modern assessments of the system's impact on the cultivator have varied considerably. In core dasturs of the Doab the cash burden was sufficiently moderate, in years of normal harvest, that cultivated area expanded steadily through the late sixteenth century, with new villages and reclaimed banjar land becoming common. The fixed cash demand also encouraged commercialisation of agriculture: cultivators sold a sufficient share of their produce in local markets to obtain rupees or dams in time for the revenue collection.

The fixed cash demand became less attractive when grain prices fell. Because the dasturs were calculated from a notional ten-year average rather than from the current price, a sustained price decline raised the real burden on the cultivator while leaving the nominal cash demand unchanged. Habib has shown that this asymmetry, especially in years following a poor harvest, contributed to peasant indebtedness, distress migration, and the appearance of zamindar-led peasant unrest in the seventeenth century.

The system also restructured the relationship between cultivator and intermediary. Because the dasturs were known to the cultivator in principle, through the patta or written assessment receipt, the bargaining power of the zamindar was reduced relative to earlier nasaq arrangements. In practice the zamindar retained considerable scope to manipulate the assessment by mis-classifying land, under-recording acreage, or under-reporting yields, and the dasturs constrained rather than eliminated this discretion.

== Historiography ==
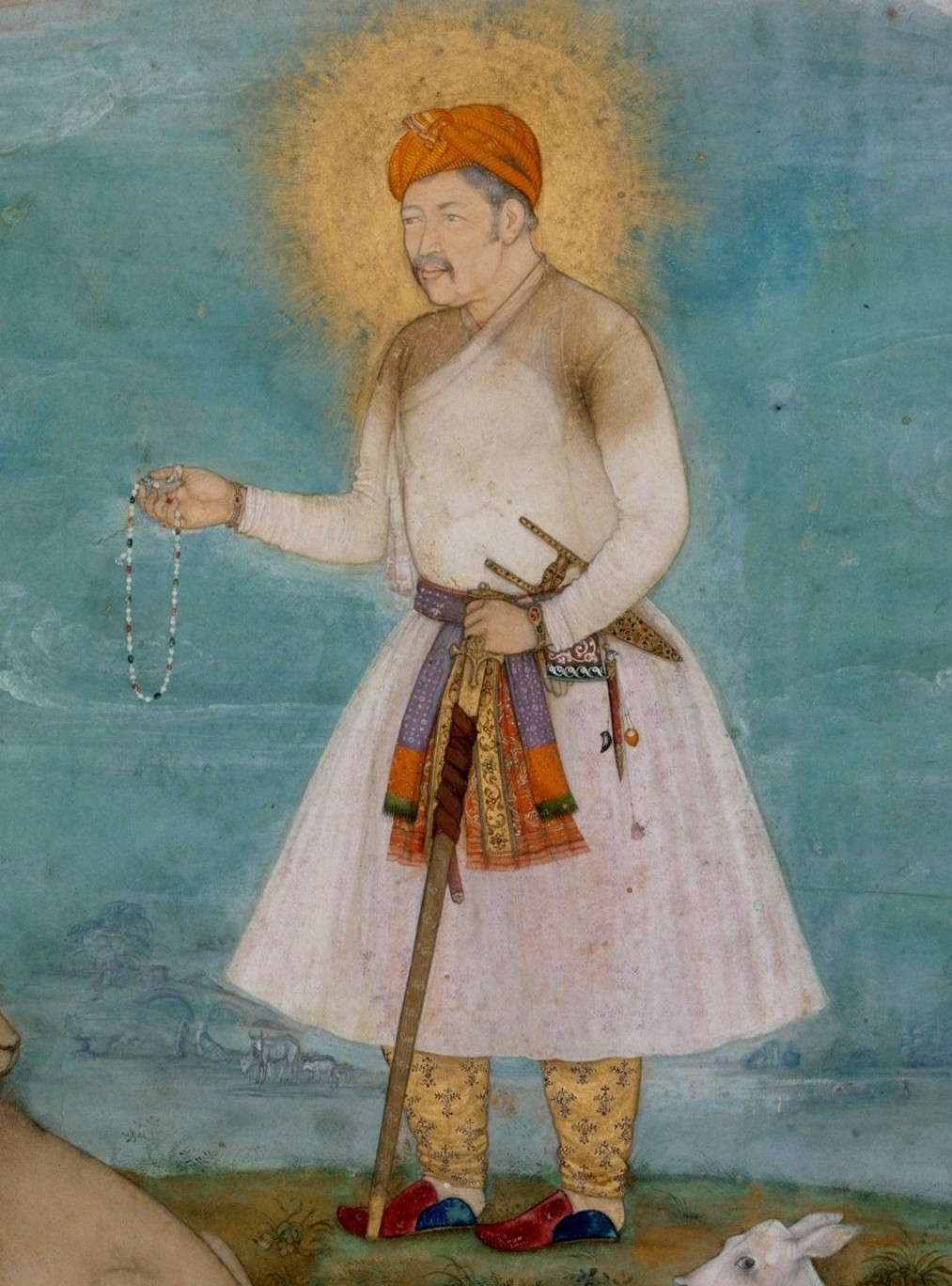
Akbar with lion and calf, c. 1630. The reign of Akbar (r. 1556–1605), under whose authority the dahsala settlement was implemented, has been a central focus of modern Mughal historiography since the late nineteenth century.

Modern study of the dahsala system began with W. H. Moreland, a former Director of Land Records and Agriculture in the United Provinces, whose The Agrarian System of Moslem India (1929) examined the Ain-i-Akbari evidence in detail. Moreland understood the system as a relatively crude administrative simplification: an existing cash schedule was averaged over the previous decade to smooth annual fluctuation. He treated the assessment as falling well below one-third in many provinces and viewed the system as comparatively benign on the cultivator.

Irfan Habib's The Agrarian System of Mughal India 1556–1707, first published by Asia Publishing House in 1963 and revised by Oxford University Press in 1999 and 2014, recast Moreland's account on three points. First, Habib argued that the ten-year averaging applied directly to recorded yields and prices, not to a pre-existing cash schedule; the dasturs were therefore reconstructed from primary data, not smoothed from earlier rates. Second, Habib showed that the effective state share, after officially sanctioned additional charges, frequently approached or exceeded one-half rather than the nominal one-third in many areas. Third, Habib argued that the dahsala system bore directly on the agrarian crisis of the late seventeenth century by binding cultivators to fixed cash demands that became insupportable when prices or yields fell.

Shireen Moosvi's The Economy of the Mughal Empire c. 1595 (1987; revised 2015) extended Habib's framework with a quantitative reconstruction of the dahsala statistics in the Ain-i-Akbari. Moosvi calculated the implied jama (assessed demand) and hasil (actual collection) for each subah, compared the dasturs across regions, and showed that the system, although consistent in design, varied considerably in its incidence on cultivators in different parts of the empire. Both Habib and Moosvi were associated with the Aligarh school of historians at the Aligarh Muslim University, whose collective work has shaped the international scholarly understanding of Mughal economy and society since the 1960s.

More recent scholarship has examined the working of the dahsala dasturs at the local level. Farhat Hasan's State and Locality in Mughal India (2004), focused on western India after 1572, has shown that the dasturs interacted with strong local mercantile and intermediary networks in ways that the Aligarh-school models tended to abstract away. Synthesising treatments by John F. Richards and others have largely accepted the Aligarh-school account of the dahsala mechanism while emphasising the limited geographic reach of the system and its co-existence with very different revenue regimes elsewhere in the empire.

== Legacy ==
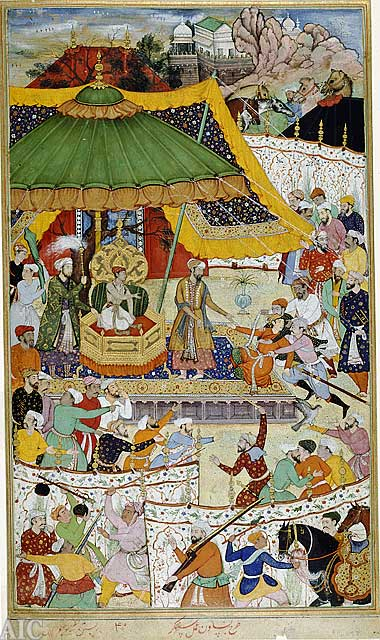
Akbar at his court, from a manuscript of the Akbarnama. The dahsala dasturs compiled under his authority remained the working assessment basis for the central provinces of the empire for more than a century after his death.

The dahsala dasturs continued in nominal force into the eighteenth century, although their actual application varied. Under Jahangir (r. 1605–1627) the schedules were extended to additional provinces and made the basis of jagir-value calculations. Under Shah Jahan (r. 1628–1658) and Aurangzeb (r. 1658–1707) further regulations modified the system at the margins; Aurangzeb's farman of 1668 to Muhammad Hashim, the diwan of the Deccan, required tighter audit of the dasturs and forbade remissions once the crop had been cut, but did not alter the underlying methodology.

After the disintegration of central Mughal authority in the eighteenth century, the dahsala framework survived in altered form in several Mughal successor states. The early administration of Bengal under Murshid Quli Khan retained the dahsala assessment as a baseline for fixing the revenue demand on the new zamindari estates. The administration of Awadh under Burhan-ul-Mulk and Safdar Jang retained the dastur structure for the central districts.

The early East India Company administration in Bengal and the North-Western Provinces used Ain-i-Akbari dasturs as a benchmark when designing the Permanent Settlement of 1793 and the later Mahalwari settlement of 1822, although both colonial systems differed substantially in their treatment of the cultivator. Twentieth-century debates over land reform in India cited the dahsala system in academic and political discussion as evidence of pre-colonial Indian administrative sophistication.

== See also ==
- Zabt
- Todar Mal
- Akbar
- Ain-i-Akbari
- Aligarh school of historians
- Jagirdari crisis
- Mansabdar
- Permanent Settlement
- Sher Shah Suri
- Mughal successor states
- Economy of the Mughal Empire
- Land tenure

== Sources ==
- Abu'l-Fazl, ʿAllāmī (1873). The Ā'īn-i Akbarī, Volume I. Translated by Blochmann, H. Calcutta: Asiatic Society of Bengal.
- Abu'l-Fazl, ʿAllāmī (1949) [1891]. The Ā'īn-i Akbarī, Volume II. Translated by Jarrett, H. S. Revised by Jadunath Sarkar. Calcutta: Asiatic Society of Bengal.
- Ali, M. Athar (2001) [1966]. The Mughal Nobility under Aurangzeb (Revised ed.). New Delhi: Oxford University Press. ISBN 978-0-19-565599-5.
- Chandra, Satish (1978). Medieval India. New Delhi: National Council of Educational Research and Training.
- Habib, Irfan (2014) [1963]. The Agrarian System of Mughal India, 1556–1707 (3rd ed.). New Delhi: Oxford University Press. ISBN 978-0-19-807742-8.
- Hasan, Farhat (2004). State and Locality in Mughal India: Power Relations in Western India, c. 1572–1730. Cambridge: Cambridge University Press.
- Moosvi, Shireen (2015) [1987]. The Economy of the Mughal Empire, c. 1595: A Statistical Study. Delhi: Oxford University Press. ISBN 978-0-19-561725-2.
- Moreland, W. H. (1929). The Agrarian System of Moslem India: A Historical Essay with Appendices. Allahabad: Central Book Depot.
- Raychaudhuri, Tapan; Habib, Irfan, eds. (1982). The Cambridge Economic History of India, Volume 1: c. 1200 – c. 1750. Cambridge: Cambridge University Press. ISBN 978-0-521-22692-9.
- Richards, John F. (1993). The Mughal Empire. The New Cambridge History of India. Vol. I.5. Cambridge: Cambridge University Press. ISBN 978-0-521-25119-8.
- Streusand, Douglas E. (2011). Islamic Gunpowder Empires: Ottomans, Safavids, and Mughals. Boulder: Westview Press.
