= Economy of the Mughal Empire =

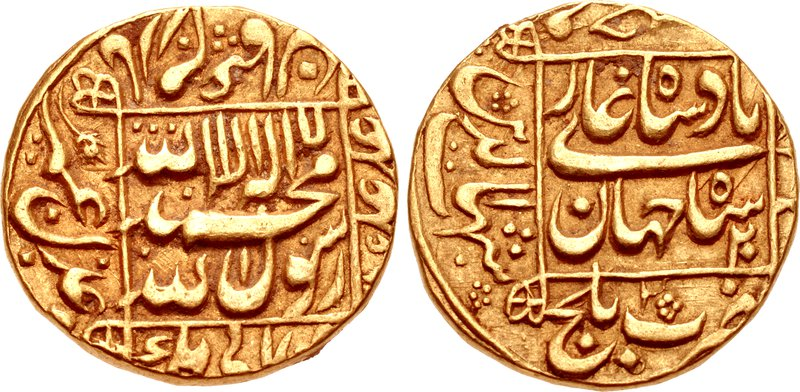
Gold mohur of Shah Jahan, dated to 1647 (AH 1057).

The Mughal economy, covering the Indian subcontinent from the early sixteenth to the mid-eighteenth century, was one of the largest in the early modern world. At its peak under Akbar and his successors, it generated an estimated 22–24 per cent of global gross domestic product (GDP) and produced roughly a quarter of world manufacturing output. While the Mughal Empire is conventionally said to have been founded in 1526 by Babur, the Mughal imperial structure, however, is sometimes dated to 1600, to the rule of Babur's grandson, Akbar. The economy in South Asia during the Mughal era increased in productivity compared to medieval times. Mughal India's economy has been described as a form of proto-industrialisation, an inspiration for the 18th-century putting-out system of Western Europe prior to the Industrial Revolution. It was described as large and prosperous. India under Mughal rule produced about 28% of the world's industrial output up until the 18th century with significant exports in textiles, shipbuilding, and steel, driving a strong export-driven economy. At the start of 17th century, the economic expansion within Mughal territories become the largest and surpassed the Qing dynasty and Europe. The share of the world's economy grew from 22.7% in 1600, which at the end of 16th century, had surpassed China to have the world's largest gross domestic product. Bengal Subah, the empire's wealthiest province, alone contributed to 12% of GDP and was a major hub for industries, contributing significantly to global trade and European imports, particularly in textiles and shipbuilding.

The Mughals standardised the currency system introduced by Sher Shah Suri, maintaining high purity in their coins and largely relying on imported bullion due to strong exports, particularly from Bengal. The Mughals were also responsible for building an extensive road system and creating a uniform currency. The empire had an extensive road network, which was vital to the commercial infrastructure, built by a public works department set up by the Mughals which designed, constructed and maintained roads linking towns and cities across the empire, making trade easier to conduct. In late 16th-century Mughal India, the primary, secondary, and tertiary sectors contributed 52%, 18%, and 29% to the economy, respectively, with urban labor making up 18% of the workforce and contributing 52% to the economy. Grain wages were comparable to England's during the 16th and 17th centuries but fell behind in the 18th century, and per-capita income in terms of wheat was higher than early 20th-century British India. The main base of the empire's collective wealth was agricultural taxes, instituted by Akbar. These taxes, which amounted to well over half the output of a peasant cultivator, were paid in the well-regulated silver currency, and caused peasants and artisans to enter larger markets.

== Currency and monetary system ==
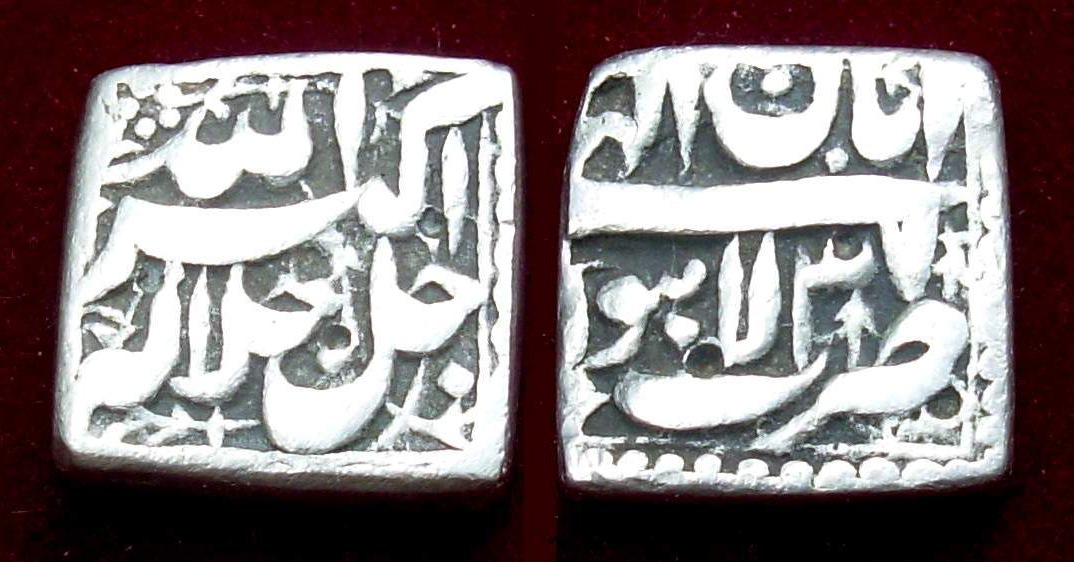
Square shaped silver rupee coin of Akbar, struck at the Lahore mint.

The Mughals adopted and standardised the rupee (rupiya, or silver), Mohur (gold) and dam (copper) currencies introduced by Sur Emperor Sher Shah Suri during his brief rule. The currency was initially 48 dams to a single rupee in the beginning of Akbar's reign, before it later became 38 dams to a rupee in the 1580s, with the dam's value rising further in the 17th century as a result of new industrial uses for copper, such as in bronze cannons and brass utensils. The dam was initially the most common coin in Akbar's time, before being replaced by the rupee as the most common coin in succeeding reigns. The dam's value was later worth 30 to a rupee towards the end of Jahangir's reign, and then 16 to a rupee by the 1660s. The Mughals minted coins with high purity, never dropping below 96%, and without debasement until the 1720s.

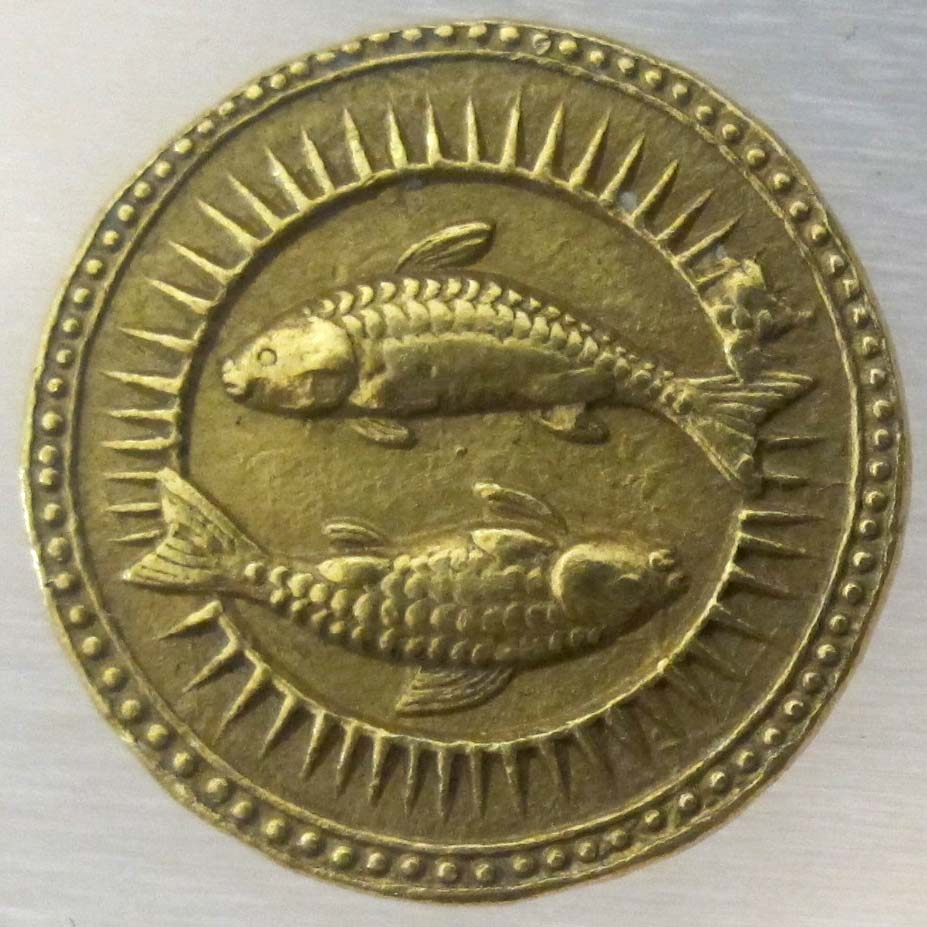
A coin issued by Emperor Jahangir, showing a fish motif.

Despite India having its own stocks of gold and silver, the Mughals produced minimal gold of their own, but mostly minted coins from imported bullion, as a result of the empire's strong export-driven economy, with global demand for Indian agricultural and industrial products drawing a steady stream of precious metals into India. Around 80% of Mughal India's imports were bullion, mostly silver, with major sources of imported bullion including the New World and Japan, which in turn imported large quantities of textiles and silk from the Bengal Subah province.

Najaf Haider estimates that between the 1580s and 1680s the Mughal mints absorbed bullion on the order of 240 million rupees, making the empire, with the exception of Ming China, the largest net importer of silver outside Europe. The inflow came from New World silver routed through the Levant and the Red Sea, Japanese silver via the Dutch, and European thalers re-minted at Surat and other imperial zarabkhanas.

== Labour ==
The historian Shireen Moosvi estimates that in terms of contributions to the Mughal economy, in the late 16th century, the primary sector contributed 52%, the secondary sector 18% and the tertiary sector 29%; the secondary sector contributed a higher percentage than in early 20th-century British India, where the secondary sector only contributed 11% to the economy. In terms of urban-rural divide, 18% of Mughal India's labour force were urban and 82% were rural, contributing 52% and 48% to the economy, respectively.

According to Stephen Broadberry and Bishnupriya Gupta, grain wages in India were comparable to England in the 16th and 17th centuries, but diverged in the 18th century when they fell to 20-40% of England's wages. This, however, is disputed by Parthasarathi and Sivramkrishna. Parthasarathi cites his estimates that grain wages for weaving and spinning in mid-18th century Bengal and South India was comparable to Britain. Similarly, Sivramkrishna analysed agricultural surveys conducted in Mysore by Francis Buchanan during 1800–1801, arrived at estimates using a "subsistence basket" that aggregated millet income could be almost five times subsistence level, while corresponding rice income was three times that much. That could be comparable to advance part of Europe. Due to the scarcity of data, however, more research is needed before drawing any conclusion.

According to Moosvi, Mughal India had a per-capita income, in terms of wheat, 1.24% higher in the late 16th century than British India did in the early 20th century. This income, however, would have to be revised downwards if manufactured goods, like clothing, would be considered. Compared to food per-capita, expenditure on clothing was much smaller though, so relative income between 1595 and 1596 should be comparable to 1901–1910. However, in a system where wealth was hoarded by elites, wages were depressed for manual labour. In Mughal India, there was a generally tolerant attitude towards manual labourers, with some religious cults in northern India proudly asserting a high status for manual labour. While slavery also existed, it was limited largely to household servants.

== Agriculture ==
Indian agricultural production increased under the Mughal Empire. A variety of crops were grown, including food crops such as wheat, rice, and barley, and non-food cash crops such as cotton, indigo and opium. By the mid-17th century, Indian cultivators begun to extensively grow two new crops from the Americas, maize and tobacco.

The Mughal administration emphasised agrarian reform, which began under the non-Mughal emperor Sher Shah Suri, the work of which Akbar adopted and furthered with more reforms. The civil administration was organised in a hierarchical manner on the basis of merit, with promotions based on performance. The Mughal government funded the building of irrigation systems across the empire, which produced much higher crop yields and increased the net revenue base, leading to increased agricultural production. From the late 17th century to the early 18th century, India accounted for 95% of British imports from Asia, and Bengal Subah province alone accounted for 40% of Dutch imports from Asia.

A major Mughal reform introduced by Akbar was a new land revenue system called zabt. He replaced the tribute system, previously common in India and used by Tokugawa Japan at the time, with a monetary tax system based on a uniform currency. The revenue system was biased in favour of higher value cash crops such as cotton, indigo, sugar cane, tree-crops, and opium, providing state incentives to grow cash crops, in addition to rising market demand. Under the zabt system, the Mughals also conducted extensive cadastral surveying to assess the area of land under plow cultivation, with the Mughal state encouraging greater land cultivation by offering tax-free periods to those who brought new land under cultivation. The expansion of agriculture and cultivation continued under later Mughal emperors including Aurangzeb, whose 1665 firman edict stated: "the entire elevated attention and desires of the Emperor are devoted to the increase in the population and cultivation of the Empire and the welfare of the whole peasantry and the entire people."

Mughal agriculture was in some ways advanced compared to European agriculture at the time, exemplified by the common use of the seed drill among Indian peasants before its adoption in Europe. While the average peasant across the world was only skilled in growing very few crops, the average Indian peasant was skilled in growing a wide variety of food and non-food crops, increasing their productivity. Indian peasants were also quick to adapt to profitable new crops, such as maize and tobacco from the New World being rapidly adopted and widely cultivated across Mughal India between 1600 and 1650. Bengali farmers rapidly learned techniques of mulberry cultivation and sericulture, establishing Bengal Subah as a major silk-producing region of the world. Sugar mills appeared in India shortly before the Mughal era. Evidence for the use of a draw bar for sugar-milling appears at Delhi in 1540, but may also date back earlier, and was mainly used in the northern Indian subcontinent. Geared sugar rolling mills first appeared in Mughal India, using the principle of rollers as well as worm gearing, by the 17th century. The Mughal era sugar production also appeared by the foundings of archaeology evidence by Aligarh Muslim University in 2020 in Agra.

According to economic historian Immanuel Wallerstein, citing evidence from Irfan Habib, Percival Spear, and Ashok Desai, per-capita agricultural output and standards of consumption in 17th-century Mughal India were probably higher than in 17th-century Europe and certainly higher than early 20th-century British India. The increased agricultural productivity led to lower food prices. In turn, this benefited the Indian textile industry. Compared to Britain, the price of grain was about one-half in South India and one-third in Bengal, in terms of silver coinage. This resulted in lower silver coin prices for Indian textiles, giving them a price advantage in global markets.

== Revenue and fiscal system ==
The Mughal fiscal system rested on the mansabdari ranking system, which tied military and civil office-holders to numerical ranks (zat and sawar) and paid most of them through jagir assignments of revenue from designated tracts rather than cash salaries. Under Akbar the land revenue was reorganised as zabt, replacing earlier tribute arrangements with a cash demand assessed on measured acreage and ten-year average prices of each crop. The intermediary zamindars collected the demand and remitted a share to the treasury, retaining the rest as nankar. Moosvi estimates the imperial revenue claim at roughly a third of gross agricultural produce in the late sixteenth century.

== Trade, merchants, and transport ==
=== Inland trade and routes ===
A network of imperial highways anchored by the Grand Trunk Road and served by sarais at day-march intervals linked Lahore, Delhi, Agra, Patna and Dhaka; overland caravans also moved Indian textiles, indigo and sugar into Iran, Central Asia and beyond.

=== Maritime trade and ports ===
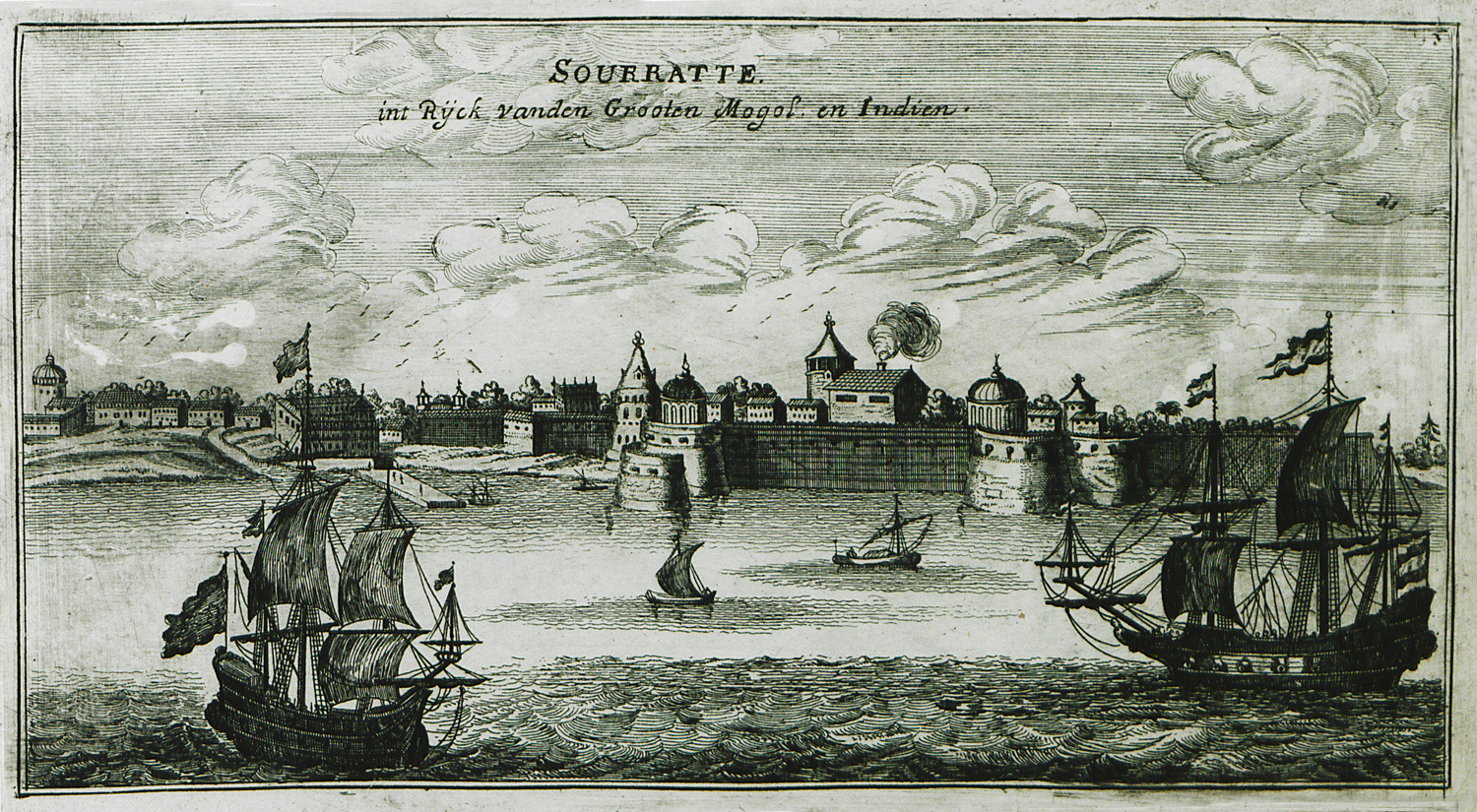
Surat in 1690, from Jacob Peeters's engraving. Surat was the empire's principal western port and the main embarkation point for the Hajj.

Surat served as the empire's principal western port and the main embarkation point for the Hajj, while Hooghly, Masulipatnam and Balasore handled eastern traffic with Southeast Asia and the Persian Gulf. Indian maritime trade was described by Chaudhuri as one of the most extensive commercial circuits of the pre-industrial world, with regular seasonal voyages tied to the monsoon.

=== Merchant communities ===
Long-distance trade was dominated by Banias, Marwaris, Khatris, Bohras, Armenians and Parsis. The Jagat Seths of Bengal acted as bankers to the Nawab and the European companies alike.

== Banking, credit, and hundi ==
Mughal commerce was lubricated by an indigenous credit network in which sarrafs (money-changers and bankers) issued hundi bills of exchange that could be discounted, endorsed and redeemed at agreed rates across distant cities. By the early eighteenth century, firms such as the Jagat Seths of Murshidabad were transferring the imperial diwani revenue of Bengal, financing the Nawab, and acting as principal bankers to the East India Company.

== Urbanisation ==
Moosvi estimates the urban share of Mughal India's population at around 15 per cent in the late sixteenth century, comparable to contemporary Western Europe. Agra, Delhi, Lahore, Ahmedabad, Dhaka and Patna each held populations on the order of several hundred thousand at their peaks, placing them among the largest cities in the world at the time. Imperial capitals grew or contracted with the movement of the court; Shah Jahan's founding of Shahjahanabad in 1648 and Aurangzeb's prolonged absence in the Deccan from 1681 each reshaped the urban hierarchy.

== Diamond mining ==
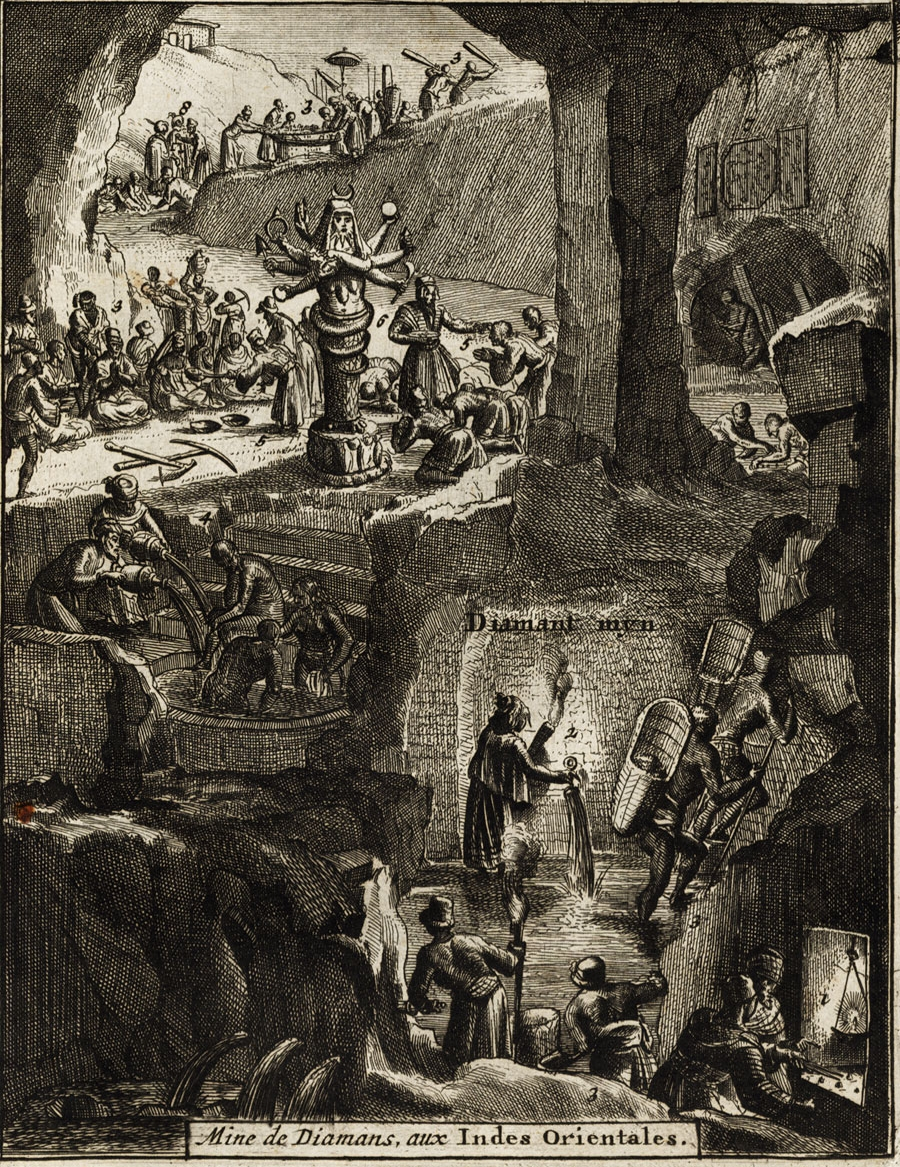
Diamond mine in the Golconda region 1725 CE from the collection of Pieter van der Aa—a Dutch publisher known for preparing maps and atlases.

India during Mughal rule has produced many legendary gems, including the Koh-i-Noor, Hope Diamond, Regent Diamond, Great Mogul Diamond, and the Orlov Diamond. Particularly from the Diamond mining activities in Golconda, where, After the Siege of Golconda, Badshah Aurangzeb has acquired the diamond mining of Golconda. After the conquest of Golconda, the diamond mines, which had been the Golconda Sultans famed source of wealth, had stopped functioning following the conquest of Hyderabad, but in 1692 mining was restarted in service of the Mughals. Until the 17th century, mines in this region were the only source of diamonds on earth. Mines was usually up to 4 fathoms (7.3 m; 24 ft) deep.

The testimonial proof of lucrative diamonds of Golconda are under the supervision of regional governors, of whom 17th-century prominent diamond trader Mir Jumla, who served as Grand vizier (Prime Minister) of the Golconda Sultanate, came to serve the Mughals. He established a network of diamond merchants in Europe, Africa, the Middle East, and Asia up to China and the Malay Archipelago. which Mir Jumla had his own ships and organised merchant fleets in the 1640s that sailed throughout Surat, Thatta, Arakan, Ayuthya, Balasore, Aceh, Melaka, Johore, Bantam, Makassar, Ceylon, Bandar Abbas, Mecca, Jeddah, Basra, Aden, Masqat, Mocha and the Maldives. By his enormous wealth, he was able to recruit Pathans, Rajputs, Afghans and Mughals in his campaign to Bijapur in 1652. In 1653-1654, in one of Aurengzeb's letters to Shah Jahan, Aurengzeb cites a report of his agent Mohammad Amin where Mir Jumla is said to have maintained a force of 9000 Cavalry, 20000 infantry and his army filled with Iraqi and Arabi horses.

Shantidas Jhaveri, was also a diamond trader from this area during the era of Mughal rule.

== Industrial manufacturing ==
Up until 1700, India produced about 25% of the world's industrial output. Manufactured goods and cash crops from the Mughal Empire were sold throughout the world. Key industries included textiles, shipbuilding, and steel. Processed products included cotton textiles, yarns, thread, silk, jute products, metalware, and foods such as sugar, oils and butter. The growth of manufacturing industries in the Indian subcontinent during the Mughal era in the 17th–18th centuries has been referred to as a form of proto-industrialisation, similar to 18th-century Western Europe prior to the Industrial Revolution.

In early modern Europe, there was significant demand for products from Mughal India, particularly cotton textiles, as well as goods such as spices, peppers, indigo, silks, and saltpeter (for use in munitions). European fashion, for example, became increasingly dependent on Mughal Indian textiles and silks. From the late 17th century to the early 18th century, Mughal India accounted for 95% of British imports from Asia, and the Bengal Subah province alone accounted for 40% of Dutch imports from Asia. In contrast, there was very little demand for European goods in Mughal India, which was largely self-sufficient, thus Europeans had very little to offer, except for some woolens, unprocessed metals and a few luxury items. The trade imbalance caused Europeans to export large quantities of gold and silver to Mughal India in order to pay for South Asian imports. Indian goods, especially those from Bengal, were also exported in large quantities to other Asian markets, such as Indonesia and Japan.

=== Textile industry ===
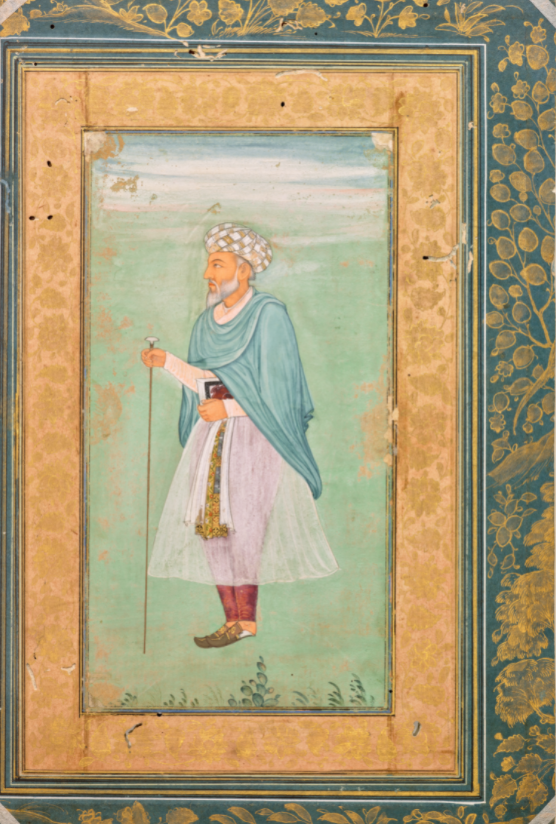
Miniature painting - Portrait of an Old Mughal Courtier Wearing Muslin

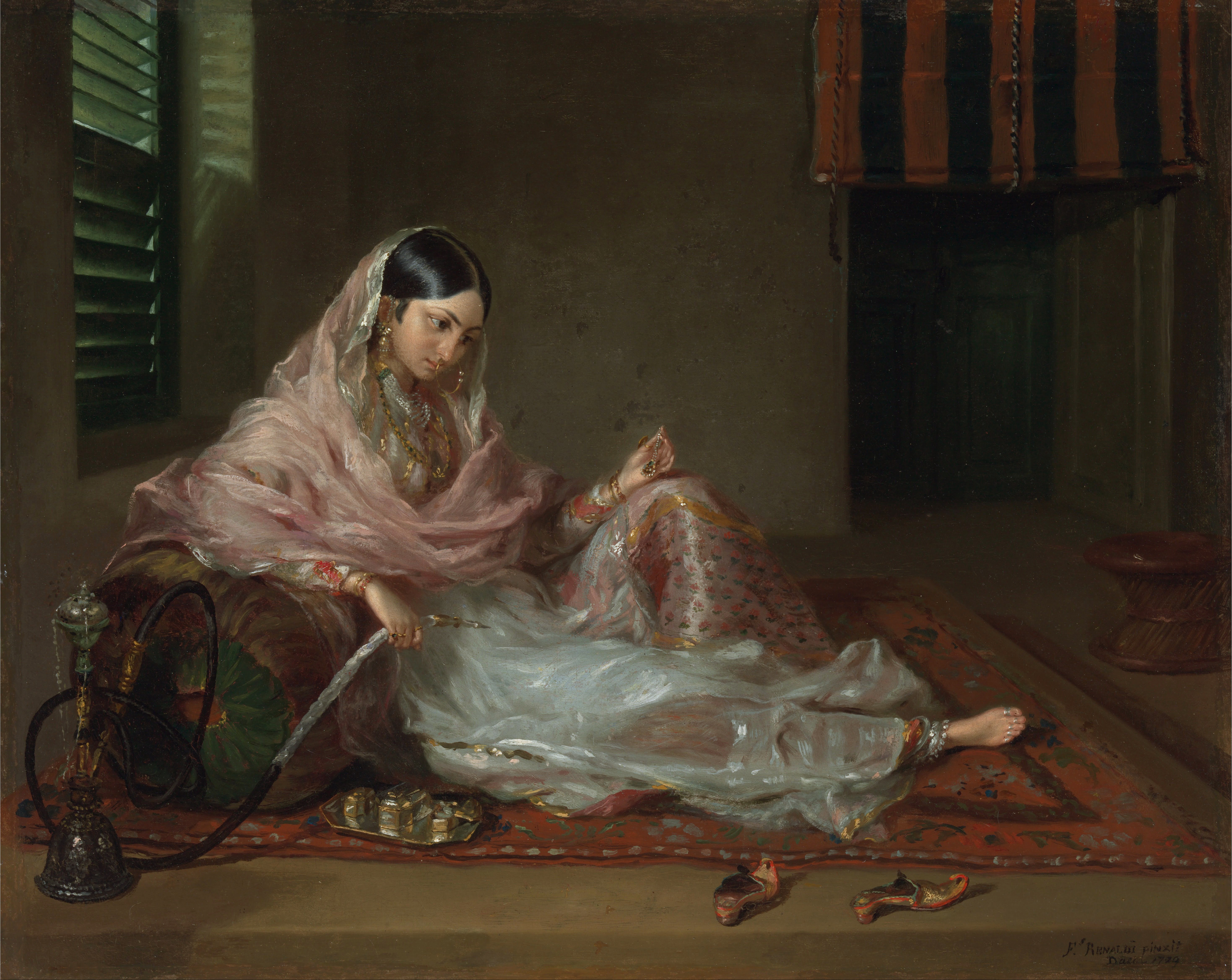
Muslim Lady Reclining or An Indian Girl with a Hookah, painted in Dacca, 18th century

The largest manufacturing industry in the Mughal Empire was textile manufacturing, particularly cotton textile manufacturing, which included the production of piece goods, calicos, and muslins, available unbleached and in a variety of colours. The cotton textile industry was responsible for a large part of the empire's international trade. India had a 25% share of the global textile trade in the early 18th century. Indian cotton textiles were the most important manufactured goods in world trade in the 18th century, consumed across the world from the Americas to Japan. By the early 18th century, Mughal Indian textiles were clothing people across the Indian subcontinent, Southeast Asia, Europe, the Americas, Africa, and the Middle East. The most important centre of cotton production was the Bengal province, particularly around its capital city of Dhaka.

Bengal accounted for more than 50% of textiles and around 80% of silks imported by the Dutch from Asia, Bengali silk and cotton textiles were exported in large quantities to Europe, Indonesia, and Japan, and Bengali muslin textiles from Dhaka were sold in Central Asia, where they were known as "Dhaka textiles". Indian textiles dominated the Indian Ocean trade for centuries, were sold in the Atlantic Ocean trade, and had a 38% share of the West African trade in the early 18th century, while Indian calicos were a major force in Europe, and Indian textiles accounted for 20% of total English trade with Southern Europe in the early 18th century.

The worm gear roller cotton gin, which was invented in India during the early Delhi Sultanate era of the 13th–14th centuries, came into use in the Mughal Empire sometime around the 16th century, and is still used in India through to the present day. Another innovation, the incorporation of the crank handle in the cotton gin, first appeared in India sometime during the late Delhi Sultanate or the early Mughal Empire. The production of cotton, which may have largely been spun in the villages and then taken to towns in the form of yarn to be woven into cloth textiles, was advanced by the diffusion of the spinning wheel across India shortly before the Mughal era, lowering the costs of yarn and helping to increase demand for cotton. The diffusion of the spinning wheel, and the incorporation of the worm gear and crank handle into the roller cotton gin led to greatly expanded Indian cotton textile production during the Mughal era.

Once, the Mughal emperor Akbar asked his courtiers, which was the most beautiful flower. Some said rose, from whose petals were distilled the precious attar, others, the lotus, glory of every Indian village. But Birbal said, “The cotton boll”. There was a scornful laughter and Akbar asked for an explanation. Birbal said, “Your Majesty, from the cotton boll comes the fine fabric prized by merchants across the seas that has made your empire famous throughout the world. The perfume of your fame far exceeds the scent of roses and jasmine. That is why I say the cotton boll is the most beautiful flower.

=== Shipbuilding industry ===
Mughal India had a large shipbuilding industry, which was also largely centred in the Bengal province. Economic historian Indrajit Ray estimates shipbuilding output of Bengal during the sixteenth and seventeenth centuries at 223,250 tons annually, compared with 23,061 tons produced in nineteen colonies in North America from 1769 to 1771. He also assesses ship repairing as very advanced in Bengal.

Indian shipbuilding, particularly in Bengal, was advanced compared to European shipbuilding at the time, with Indians selling ships to European firms. An important innovation in shipbuilding was the introduction of a flushed deck design in Bengal rice ships, resulting in hulls that were stronger and less prone to leak than the structurally weak hulls of traditional European ships built with a stepped deck design. The British East India Company later duplicated the flushed deck and hull designs of Bengal rice ships in the 1760s, leading to significant improvements in seaworthiness and navigation for European ships during the Industrial Revolution.

== Regional economies ==
=== Bengal Subah ===
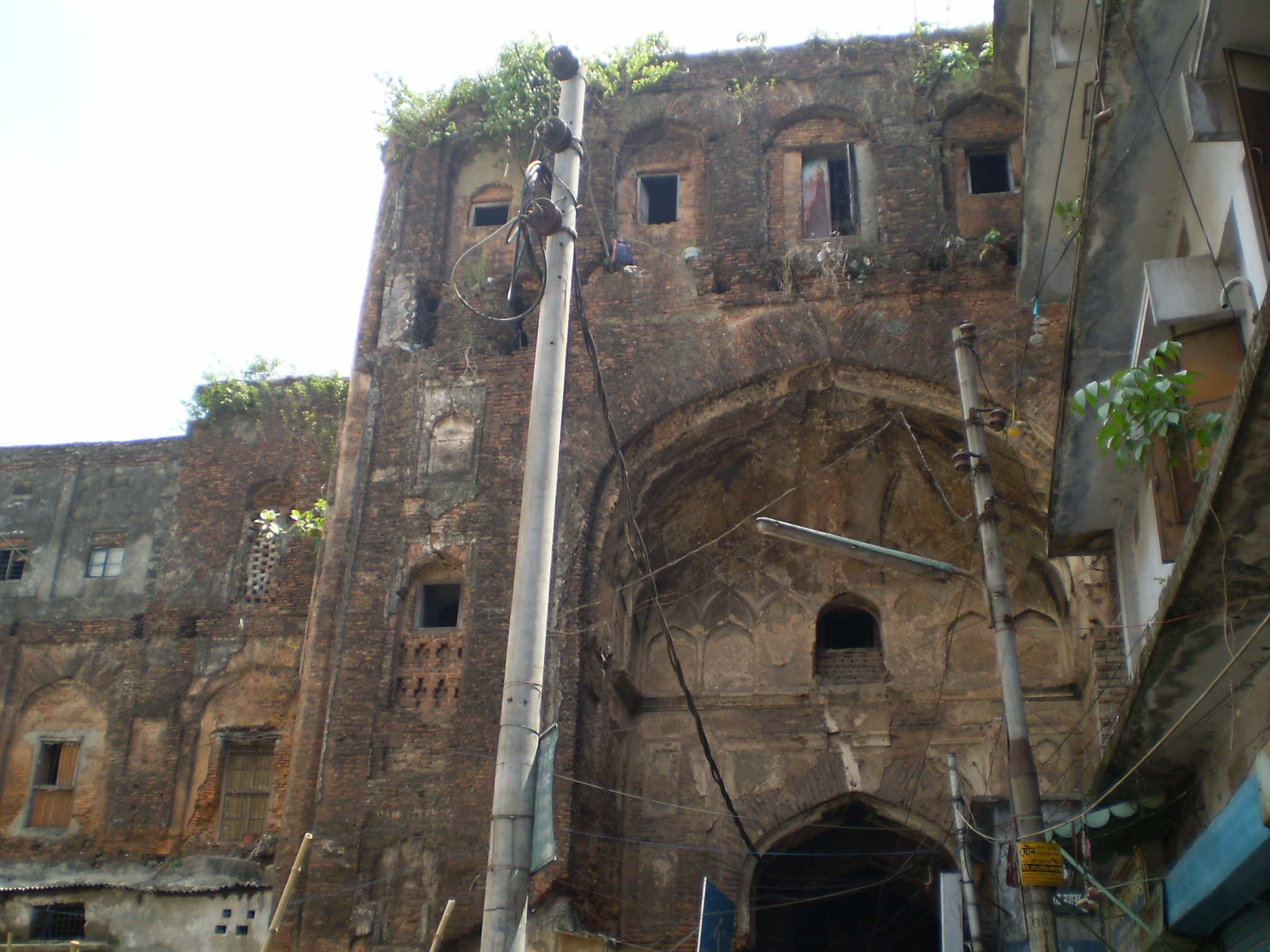
Ruins of the Great Caravanserai in Dhaka.

The province of Bengal was especially prosperous from the time of its takeover by the Mughals in 1590 until the British East India Company seised control in 1757. It was the Mughal Empire's wealthiest province. Domestically, much of India depended on Bengali products such as rice, silks and cotton textiles. Overseas, Europeans depended on Bengali products such as cotton textiles, silks, and opium; Bengal accounted for 40% of Dutch imports from Asia, for example, including more than 50% of textiles and around 80% of silks. From Bengal, saltpeter was also shipped to Europe, opium was sold in Indonesia, raw silk was exported to Japan and the Netherlands, and cotton and silk textiles were exported to Europe, Indonesia and Japan.

Akbar played a key role in establishing Bengal as a leading centre of commerce, as he began transforming many of the jungles there into farms. As soon as he conquered the region, he brought tools and men to clear jungles in order to expand cultivation and brought Sufis to open the jungles to farming. Bengal was later described as the Paradise of Nations by Mughal emperors. The Mughals introduced agrarian reforms, including the modern Bengali calendar. The calendar played a vital role in developing and organising harvests, tax collection and Bengali culture in general, including the New Year and Autumn festivals.

The province was a leading producer of grains, salt, fruits, liquors and wines, precious metals and ornaments. Its handloom industry flourished under royal warrants, making the region a hub of the worldwide muslin trade, which peaked in the 17th and 18th centuries. The provincial capital Dhaka became the commercial capital of the empire. The Mughals expanded cultivated land in the Bengal delta under the leadership of Sufis, which consolidated the foundation of Bengali Muslim society.

After 150 years of rule by Mughal viceroys, Bengal gained semi-independence as a dominion under the Nawab of Bengal in 1717. The Nawabs permitted European companies to set up trading posts across the region, including firms from Britain, France, the Netherlands, Denmark, Portugal and Austria. An Armenian community dominated banking and shipping in major cities and towns. The Europeans regarded Bengal as the richest place for trade. By the late 18th century, the British displaced the Mughal ruling class in Bengal.

== Decline and deindustrialisation ==
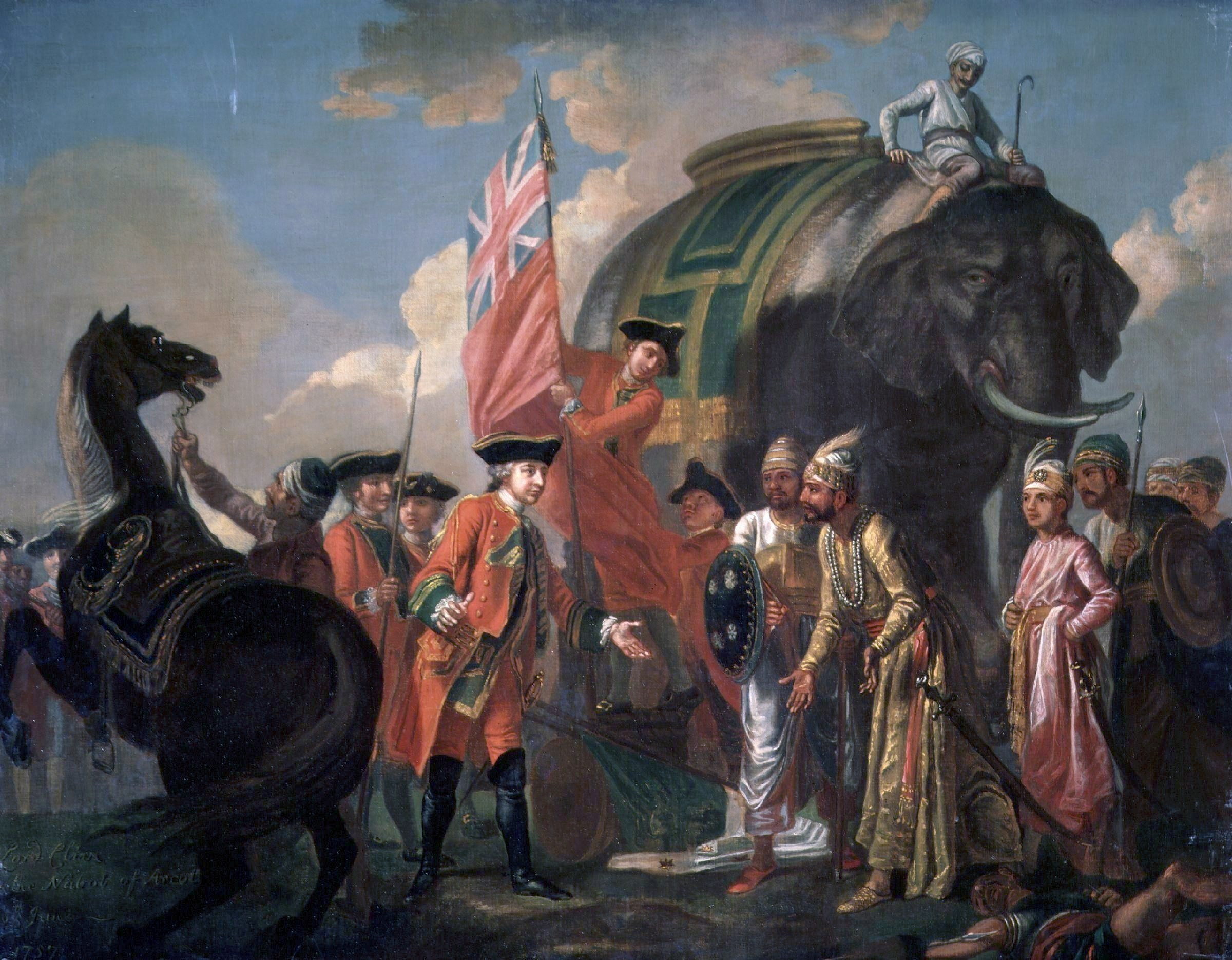
Francis Hayman, Robert Clive and Mir Jafar after the Battle of Plassey (c. 1762). The 1757 victory and the subsequent grant of the diwani of Bengal to the East India Company in 1765 shifted the empire's richest provincial revenue to the Company.

After Aurangzeb's death in 1707, imperial authority fragmented under succession wars, the sack of Delhi by Nadir Shah in 1739, Afghan invasions, and the rise of successor states including the Marathas, the Nawabs of Awadh and the Nizams of Hyderabad. The British victory at Plassey in 1757 and the grant of diwani over Bengal in 1765 shifted the revenue of the empire's richest province to the East India Company. Over the following decades Indian textile exports collapsed as Britain industrialised and imposed discriminatory tariffs; Broadberry and Gupta argue the silver-wage gap between Europe and Asia had already widened before 1800, so the political transition accelerated an ongoing divergence rather than beginning one.

== Historiography ==
The modern study of the Mughal economy begins with W. H. Moreland's From Akbar to Aurangzeb (1923), a largely pessimistic reading drawn from travellers' accounts. The Aligarh historians, led by Irfan Habib, reframed the field through revenue records and documentary sources, emphasising agrarian structure and the contradictions that produced crisis. Shireen Moosvi's quantitative reconstruction of the 1595 A'in-i-Akbari data remains the standard statistical benchmark. More recent work by Sanjay Subrahmanyam, Om Prakash, Tirthankar Roy and Prasannan Parthasarathi has shifted emphasis towards maritime commerce, merchant communities, and comparative measures of early modern living standards.

== See also ==
- Economic history of India
- Economic history of the Indian subcontinent
