= Sikh Army =

Sikh Army may refer to these militias associated with Sikhism:

- Akal Sena, before 1699
- Khalsa Fauj, 1699–1735
- Dal Khalsa (Sikh Army), 1735–1799
- Sikh Khalsa Army 1799–1849

== See also ==
- Khalsa (disambiguation)
