= Zabt =

Mughal Empire land revenue system based on measurement and fixed cash rates

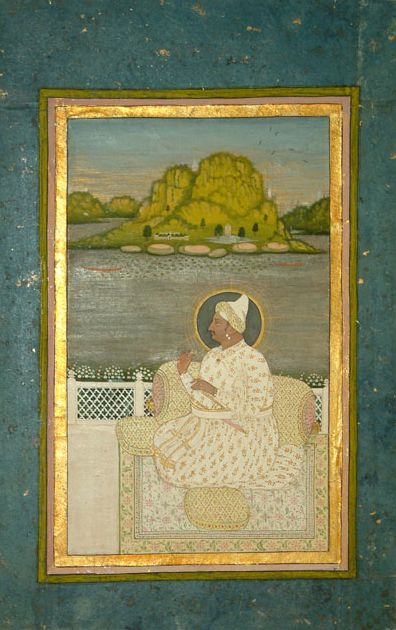
- Mughal painting of Raja Todar Mal, chief architect of the 1580 dahsala settlement and the mature zabt system
- Type: Land revenue system
- Polity: Mughal Empire
- Principal reformer: Raja Todar Mal
- Formal adoption: 1580 (dahsala settlement)
- Companion instruments: Dahsala, dastur-ul-amal
- Principal medium: Cash demand fixed in dams and rupees
- Partially succeeded by: Revenue surveys of the Mughal successor states; Permanent Settlement of Bengal (1793)

Zabt (Persian: ضبط, literally "regulation" or "fixed assessment"; also rendered zabti; /zʌbt/; ZUBT) was the principal land revenue system of the Mughal Empire from the late sixteenth century onward. Under the system, revenue demand on cultivated land was fixed in cash on the basis of systematic measurement and regionally differentiated per-unit rates rather than on the annual share of the crop. It was formalised in the dahsala (ten-year) settlement of 1580 by Akbar's revenue minister, Raja Todar Mal, and set out at length in the Ain-i-Akbari of Abul Fazl ibn Mubarak.

Zabt had four load-bearing components: systematic measurement of cultivated land using the bigha as the standard unit; classification of land by productivity and continuity of cultivation; regional schedules of cash demand per bigha per crop, called dasturs or dastur-ul-amal; and a chain of collection running from the village through the pargana and sarkar to the imperial treasury, staffed by a tiered bureaucracy of amils, qanungos and patwaris.

Zabt operated alongside two older modes of Mughal assessment, ghalla-bakhshi (crop-sharing, assessed at the threshing floor) and nasaq (assessment by reference to records), which continued in regions where the revenue administration judged full zabt impractical. Under Akbar's successors the system was extended into the newly annexed territories of the Deccan with uneven success, and it was hollowed out during the later seventeenth century by the strains associated with what historians call the jagirdari crisis. After the disintegration of imperial authority in the early eighteenth century the zabt framework was inherited and adapted by the revenue offices of the Mughal successor states and, after 1765, by the British East India Company.

Zabt has been central to the historiography of the Mughal economy since the publication of Irfan Habib's The Agrarian System of Mughal India in 1963. Shireen Moosvi's 1987 statistical reconstruction of the revenue figures in the Ain-i-Akbari established the empirical benchmark against which later scholarship has worked, while more recent studies by Muzaffar Alam, Farhat Hasan and others have shifted attention from the system's imperial coherence to its negotiation with regional and local power.

== Etymology and terminology ==
The word zabt derives from the Arabic root ض ب ط, meaning "to regulate" or "to hold fast". In Persian administrative usage the term acquired the extended sense of "exact assessment" or "fixed regulation" and was current in the fiscal vocabulary of the Delhi Sultanate before its adoption in Mughal revenue practice.

Mughal documents use several related labels: zabt, zabti, zabt-i-kamil (complete zabt), and, after the introduction of the ten-year rate cycle, dahsala. The Ain-i-Akbari treats the terms as cognate but distinct: zabt denotes the general principle of fixed cash assessment on measured land, while dahsala refers specifically to the 1580 ten-year rate settlement devised by Todar Mal.

== Background ==
=== Delhi Sultanate and the Lodi legacy ===
Revenue practice in north India before the Mughal period combined Alauddin Khalji's strict market-regulated assessment in the late thirteenth century with the more permissive Sayyid and Lodi arrangements of the fifteenth century. Under the Lodis, assessment was usually left to the local cultivating community, with the sultanate taking a share of the gross produce through its appointees, the muqtis and iqtadars.

=== Sher Shah Suri's reforms ===
Systematic measurement-based revenue was first introduced on an imperial scale by Sher Shah Suri during his brief rule from 1540 to 1545. Sher Shah's officers conducted field measurement on a per-village basis, classified crops by type, and assigned per-bigha cash demands. The Mughal zabt system adapted and expanded these precedents after the restoration of Humayun in 1555 and more comprehensively under Akbar.

== Introduction under Akbar ==
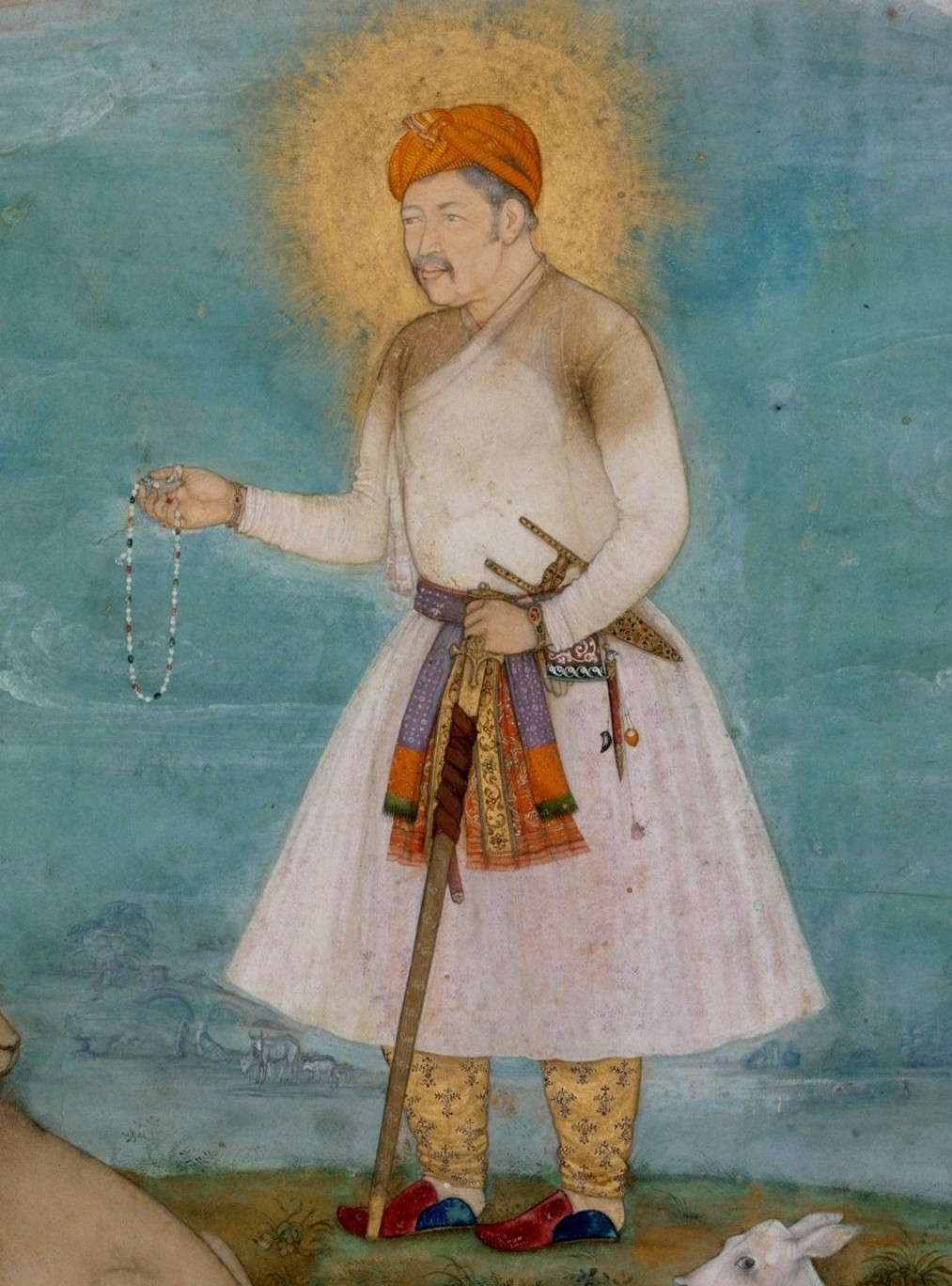
Akbar, under whom the zabt system was reformed, standardised, and codified in the Ain-i-Akbari; painting by Govardhan, c. 1630.

Revenue administration in the first decade of Akbar's reign was marked by experimentation and repeated withdrawal. Reforms attempted by Itimad Khan and Muzaffar Khan during the 1560s and 1570s aimed at restoring the Sher Shahi measurement scheme but faltered on administrative capacity. A second attempt under Shah Mansur (diwan from 1578 to 1581) introduced the karori system, under which revenue officers called karoris were assigned blocks of territory expected to yield one crore of dams each; this scheme was abandoned in 1582 after widespread complaints of abuse.

=== Todar Mal and the dahsala settlement ===
Raja Todar Mal, a Khatri accountant-administrator who had served Sher Shah before entering Mughal service, was placed in charge of imperial revenue administration in 1574. He was appointed diwan-i-ashraf in 1582 and diwan-i-kul in 1585. His reforms produced the zabt system in its mature form.

The central innovation of the 1580 settlement was the dahsala (ten-year) procedure. For each pargana, revenue records for the preceding ten harvests were averaged, and the resulting per-bigha cash demand was fixed as the dastur-ul-amal for that pargana and that crop. The ten-year window moved forward each harvest, so that the standing rate could be revised without renegotiation. The procedure stabilised both the cultivator's liability and the state's income.

== Operation ==
=== Measurement ===
The zabt system rested on periodic measurement of cultivated land in each village of a zabt-administered pargana. Measurement was carried out using the jarib, a rope divided into graduated segments. Under Akbar the ilahi gaz of approximately 33 inches (84 cm) was fixed as the standard linear unit, and a standard bigha was defined as 3,600 square ilahi gaz, or roughly 0.55 acres (0.22 hectares). The universal use of a single bigha standard across the zabt zone was itself one of the administrative achievements of the reform.

=== Land classification ===
Measured land was classified by continuity of cultivation into four categories:

Land classification under zabt
Category	Description	Dastur treatment
Polaj	Continuously cultivated every year	Full dastur rate
Parauti	Cropped intermittently with short fallow	Full dastur, reduced during fallow year
Chachar	Left fallow for three to four years	Graduated concessional rate
Banjar	Uncultivated for five or more years	Heavily concessional rate or exemption

The categories were designed to incentivise recultivation of abandoned land while penalising the withdrawal of productive land from cropping.

=== Dastur rates and crop categories ===
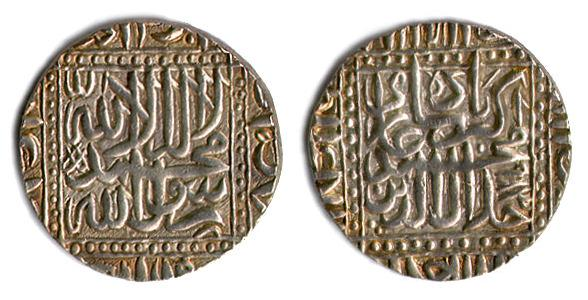
Silver rupee of Akbar. The dastur rates under zabt were expressed in dams; forty copper dams equalled one silver rupee.

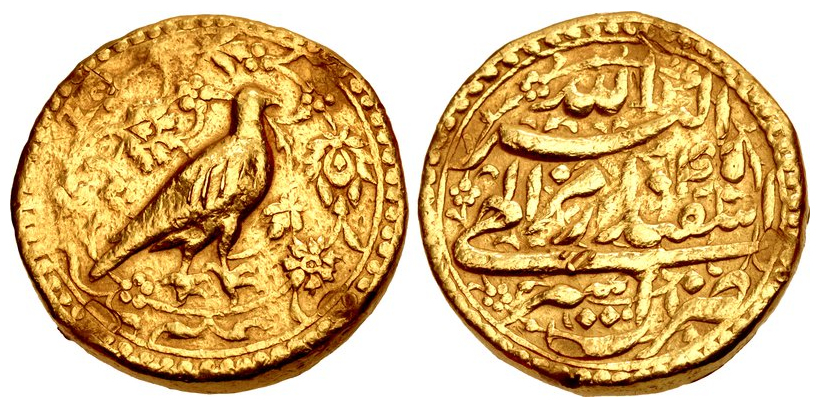
Gold mohur of Akbar, Asir mint. The silver rupee and its fractional dam formed the denominational basis of Mughal revenue accounting.

For each pargana and for each of the principal crops, the imperial revenue office computed a dastur-ul-amal, a per-bigha cash demand expressed in dams. Forty dams were equal to one silver rupee. Crops were grouped into kharif (autumn) and rabi (spring) harvests, and within each harvest into "superior" (a'la) and "inferior" (adna) classes.

Cash crops including indigo, sugarcane, cotton, opium poppy, and certain oilseeds commanded significantly higher dastur rates than food grains and are identified in the revenue vocabulary as jins-i kamil, "perfect crops".

=== Jama and hasil ===
Mughal revenue accounts kept two parallel figures for every administrative unit:

- Jama (Persian: جمع): the assessed revenue demand fixed by the dastur schedule.
- Hasil (Persian: حاصل): the actual revenue collected.

A persistent gap between the two figures signalled either overassessment or administrative failure and could trigger a downward revision of the dastur rate. Over the long run, the relationship between jama and hasil provided the principal diagnostic instrument for the state's fiscal health.

=== Comparison of assessment modes ===
Zabt, ghalla-bakhshi, and nasaq compared
Feature	Zabt	Ghalla-bakhshi	Nasaq
Basis of assessment	Cash rate per measured bigha, per crop	Crop share at the threshing floor	Reference to historical collection records
Requirement for measurement	Decennial measurement essential	Not required	Not required
Predictability for the cultivator	High	Low (depends on yield)	Medium
Administrative cost	High	Low	Low
Cash or kind demand	Cash	In kind, sometimes commuted to cash	Cash, based on historical pattern
Typical region under Akbar	Agra, Delhi, Allahabad, Awadh, Lahore, Malwa, Multan	Berar, Khandesh	Kashmir, Sindh, frontier tracts

=== The collection chain ===
Revenue moved upward through a tiered structure. At the base sat the village accountant, the patwari, and the village headman, the muqaddam. Above them the qanungo kept pargana-level records. The amil or amalguzar was the revenue official at sarkar level; above him the diwan of each subah answered to the imperial diwan-i-kul. The system required that written records follow the money upward and downward, a feature that produced the extensive documentary record on which modern historical reconstruction depends.

== Zabt and the jagir system ==
Most zabt revenue was not collected directly by the imperial treasury. Instead, the imperial revenue office assigned revenue rights over defined zabt tracts to mansabdars in the form of jagirs, in place of cash salary. The jama figure became the nominal value of the jagir, and the mansabdar or his agent, the amil, was responsible for converting the assessed demand into actual cash collection from the cultivators.

This linkage made the accuracy of the zabt assessment critical to the whole imperial fiscal and military machine. An inflated jama produced paper claims that could not be realised on the ground, while an understated jama deprived both the state and its mansabdars of revenue. The structural imbalance between jama on paper and hasil in the field became the defining problem of late-seventeenth-century administration and lies at the heart of the later jagirdari crisis literature.

== Regional variation ==
=== The zabt zone ===
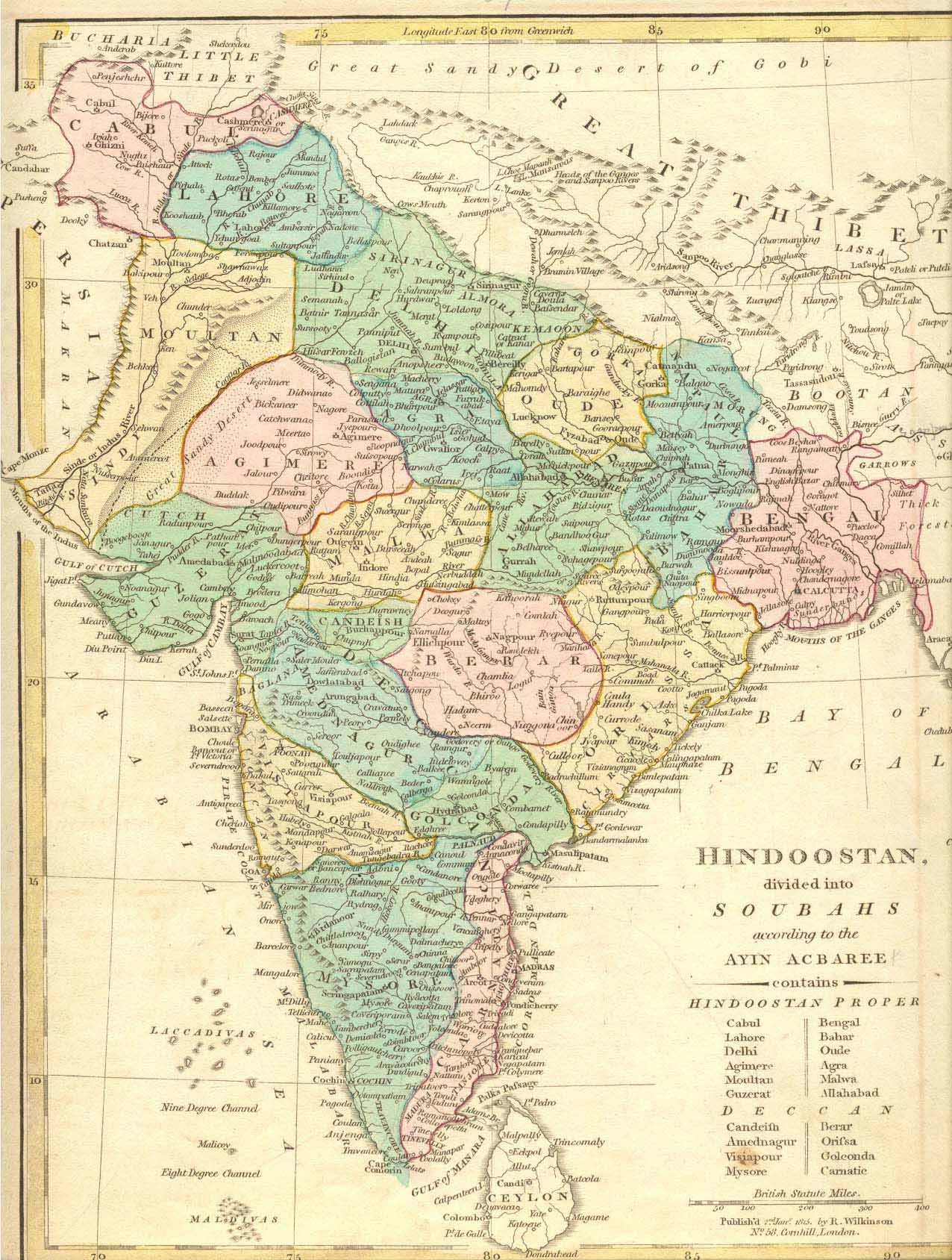
Ain-i-Akbari subahs, mapped by T. Wilkinson in 1815. The zabt zone covered the northern subahs from Lahore and Multan through Delhi, Agra, Awadh, Allahabad and Malwa.

The Ain-i-Akbari identifies zabt as the principal mode of assessment in the northern subahs of Akbar's empire: Agra, Allahabad, Awadh, Delhi, Lahore, Malwa, and Multan. Together these constituted the so-called "zabt zone", running across the Indo-Gangetic plain and adjoining Malwa. Within this zone the dastur schedules were compiled in detail, the land classifications regularly applied, and the collection chain worked with reasonable fidelity to its documentary ideal.

=== Ghalla-bakhshi, nasaq and other modes ===
In the subahs of Berar and Khandesh the crop-sharing ghalla-bakhshi mode predominated, partly because the cotton-rich black-soil cultivation of the Deccan-fringe was judged unsuitable for the bigha-based measurement. In Kashmir and Sindh, where terrain and cultivation patterns made measurement impractical, nasaq was retained. Gujarat, annexed in 1573, was assessed under a distinctive system linked to earlier Gujarat Sultanate practice and only partially recast into the zabt mould.

=== Extension into the Deccan ===
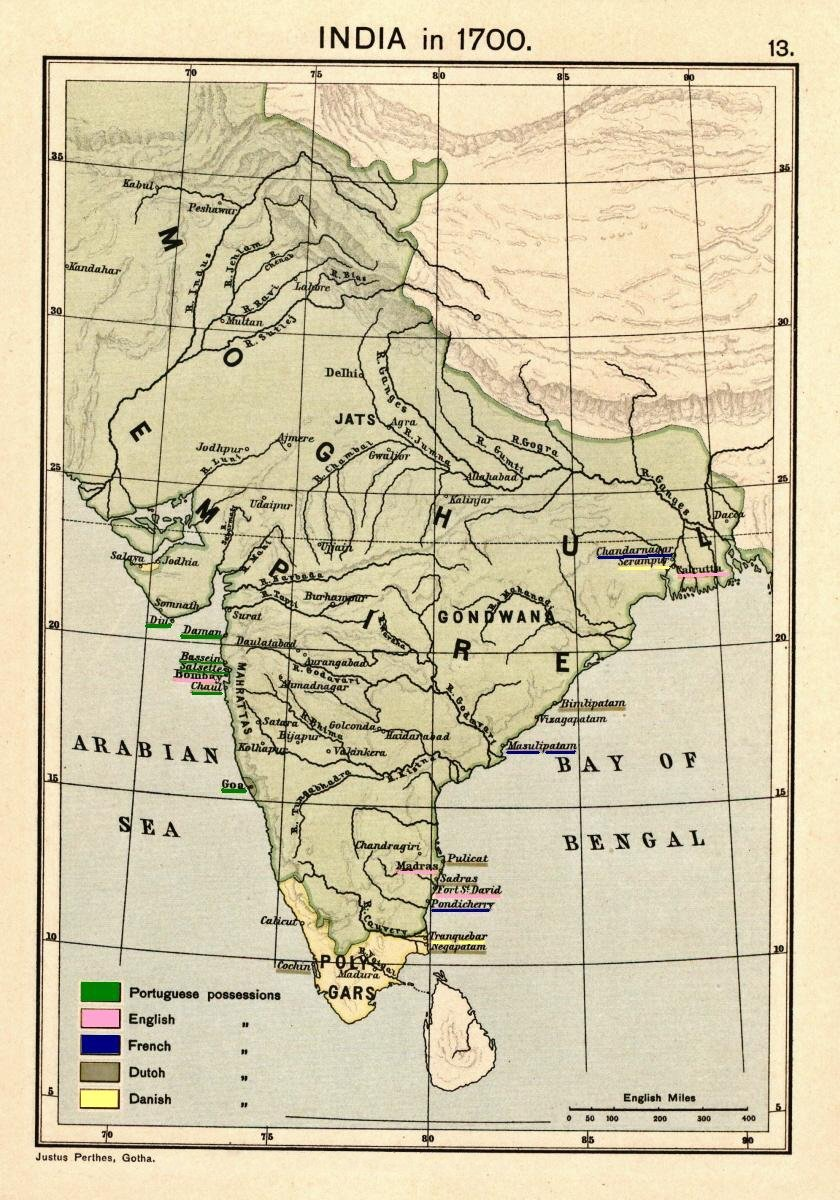
The Mughal Empire at its greatest extent, c. 1700 under Aurangzeb. The imperial revenue office attempted to extend zabt assessment into the Deccan annexations with uneven success.

Following the conquest of Ahmadnagar, Bijapur and Golconda under Aurangzeb, the imperial revenue office attempted to impose zabt assessment on the newly acquired Deccan territories. The attempt was only partially successful. Prolonged campaigning had displaced cultivators, the existing Deccan revenue categories did not map onto the Mughal dastur grid, and the share of revenue routed through crop-sharing and nasaq remained high throughout the late seventeenth century.

== Decline ==
=== Seventeenth-century strains ===
Several structural pressures accumulated in the zabt system over the course of the seventeenth century. The fixed cash dastur became a heavier burden on cultivators in years of low prices, because the demand was denominated in silver while the peasant's income varied with harvest conditions and market prices. The long Deccan wars of Aurangzeb raised the pressure on revenue circuits while simultaneously disrupting the cultivators who had to supply them. Expansion of the mansabdari corps outran the availability of productive jagirs, producing the structural mismatch between assessed jama and realisable hasil that defines the jagirdari crisis.

=== Eighteenth-century dissolution ===
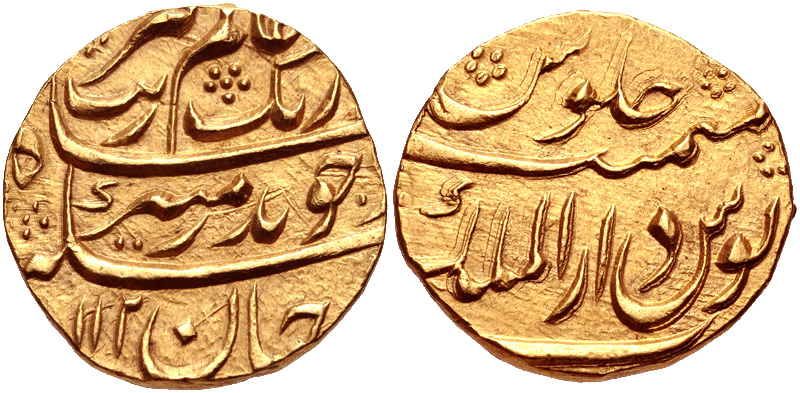
Coin of Aurangzeb, minted in Kabul, dated 1691–92. By the end of his reign, the zabt framework survived more as a documentary inheritance than as an operating system.

After 1707 the administrative hierarchy that upheld the zabt system weakened rapidly. Provincial governors in Awadh, Bengal and Hyderabad began to reconfigure revenue collection on provincial rather than imperial terms, often retaining the dastur rates on paper while in practice reverting to case-by-case assessments negotiated with local intermediaries. The Maratha revenue system of chauth and sardeshmukhi drew on zabt measurement categories where Maratha authority overlaid former Mughal territory. By the time of the Battle of Buxar in 1764 the zabt framework survived more as a set of records and vocabularies than as a functioning administrative system.

== Historiography ==
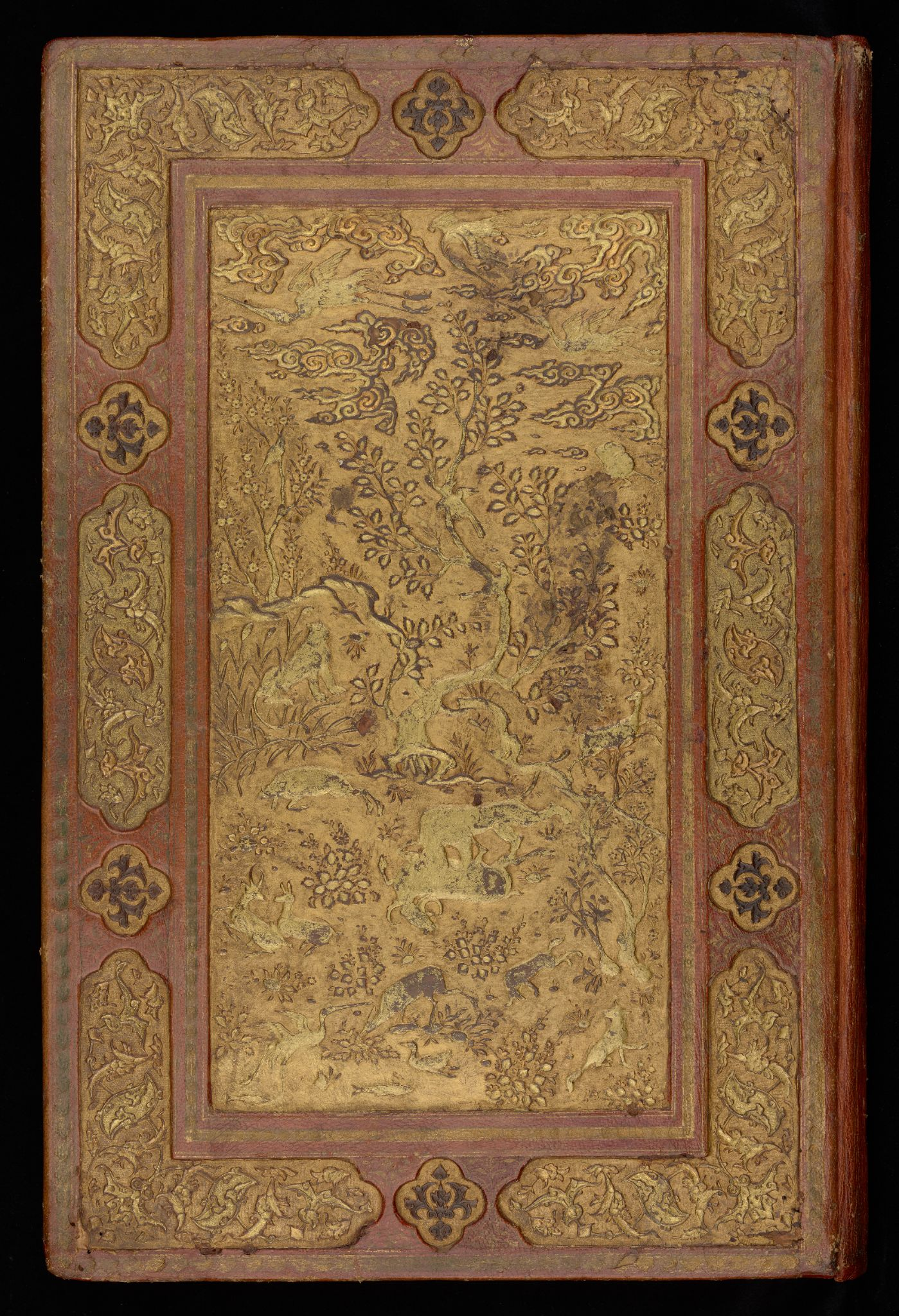
Binding of an Akbarnama manuscript, c. 1600–1605, at the Chester Beatty Library. Modern Mughal revenue history rests heavily on the Akbarnama and its companion volume, the Ain-i-Akbari.

=== Habib's Agrarian System ===
The publication of Irfan Habib's The Agrarian System of Mughal India, first issued by Oxford University Press in Bombay in 1963 and revised twice (in 1999 and 2013), inaugurated the modern study of Mughal revenue. Habib used zabt records, including the Ain-i-Akbari statistics, surviving later imperial documents, and village-level papers from post-Mughal successor districts, to reconstruct the structure and performance of Mughal agrarian relations. His conclusion, developed further in a 1969 article in The Journal of Economic History, was that Mughal fiscal pressure on the peasantry was severe enough to constrain capital accumulation and to block a capitalist transition before British conquest, despite considerable commercial sophistication in the non-agrarian economy.

=== Moosvi's quantitative reconstruction ===
Shireen Moosvi's The Economy of the Mughal Empire c. 1595 (Oxford University Press, 1987; 2nd revised edition 2015) undertook a rigorous statistical reconstruction of the 1595 revenue figures preserved in the Ain-i-Akbari. Moosvi cross-checked jama totals, price schedules and area estimates to derive aggregate estimates of gross domestic product for 1595 Mughal India, and she established the empirical benchmark against which all subsequent macroeconomic claims about Mughal India have been tested.

=== Regional studies and the Aligarh response ===
Muzaffar Alam's The Crisis of Empire in Mughal North India (1986) extended Habib's structural framework into the provincial histories of Awadh and the Punjab after 1707, stressing the interplay between imperial dissolution and regional reconsolidation. Farhat Hasan's State and Locality in Mughal India (2004) moved the frame further, treating the zabt regime less as a monolithic imperial imposition and more as a set of negotiated arrangements between the imperial centre and local power holders in western India.

=== Shifts of emphasis ===
Outside the broadly Aligarh tradition associated with Habib, Moosvi and Alam, later scholarship has placed increasing weight on the agency of local intermediaries and on the limits of imperial fiscal coherence. The broader collaborative project represented by The Cambridge Economic History of India (1982), edited by Tapan Raychaudhuri and Habib, integrated the zabt literature into a pan-Indian and comparative frame covering the period 1200 to 1750.

== Legacy ==
=== Successor states ===
The revenue offices of Awadh, Bengal, and Hyderabad inherited large portions of the zabt record-keeping apparatus, including pargana dastur books, and continued to collect on their basis well into the mid-eighteenth century. Adjustments to the dastur rates rather than their wholesale replacement were the preferred instrument of revenue reform in the successor states, even as those states gradually reoriented their fiscal priorities away from the imperial centre.

=== Colonial revenue surveys ===
After the grant of the diwani of Bengal to the East India Company in 1765, British administrators repeatedly consulted the extant Mughal dastur schedules when framing their own revenue settlements, most notably during the compilation of the Permanent Settlement of Bengal in 1793 and the later ryotwari and mahalwari surveys of the nineteenth century. The Mughal measurement system, including the bigha and the classification of land by continuity of cultivation, persisted in Indian revenue vocabulary into the twentieth century.

== See also ==
- Mughal fiscal system
- Mughal Empire
- Akbar
- Raja Todar Mal
- Ain-i-Akbari
- Dahsala system
- Jagir
- Jagirdari crisis
- Mansabdar
- Mughal successor states
- Sher Shah Suri
- Land revenue
- Permanent Settlement

== Sources ==
- Alam, Muzaffar (2013) [1986]. The Crisis of Empire in Mughal North India: Awadh and Punjab, 1707–48 (2nd ed.). New Delhi: Oxford University Press. ISBN 978-0-19-807741-1.
- Athar Ali, M. (2001) [1966]. The Mughal Nobility Under Aurangzeb (Revised ed.). New Delhi: Oxford University Press. ISBN 978-0-19-565599-5.
- Abu'l-Fazl (1873). The A'in-i Akbari, Volume I. Translated by Blochmann, H. Calcutta: Asiatic Society of Bengal.
- Habib, Irfan (1969). "Potentialities of Capitalistic Development in the Economy of Mughal India". The Journal of Economic History. 29 (1): 32–78. doi:10.1017/S0022050700097825.
- Habib, Irfan (2013) [1963]. The Agrarian System of Mughal India, 1556–1707 (3rd ed.). New Delhi: Oxford University Press. ISBN 978-0-19-807742-8.
- Hasan, Farhat (2004). State and Locality in Mughal India: Power Relations in Western India, c. 1572–1730. University of Cambridge Oriental Publications. Vol. 61. Cambridge: Cambridge University Press. ISBN 978-0-521-84119-1.
- Moosvi, Shireen (2015) [1987]. The Economy of the Mughal Empire c. 1595: A Statistical Study (2nd ed.). New Delhi: Oxford University Press. ISBN 978-0-19-945054-1.
- Raychaudhuri, Tapan; Habib, Irfan, eds. (1982). The Cambridge Economic History of India, Volume 1: c.1200–c.1750. Cambridge: Cambridge University Press. ISBN 978-0-521-22692-9.
- Richards, John F. (1993). The Mughal Empire. The New Cambridge History of India. Vol. I.5. Cambridge: Cambridge University Press. ISBN 978-0-521-56603-2.
