= Khalsa (disambiguation) =

Khalsa may refer to:

- Khalsa, baptized Sikhs and their community
  - Khalsa Fauj, Sikh militia in 18th-century Punjab
  - Dal Khalsa (Sikh army) (1748–1799), of the Sikh Confederacy
  - Sikh Khalsa Army, the military force of the Sikh Empire (1799–1849)
- Balestier Khalsa FC, Singaporean professional football club
- Sarabjeet Singh Khalsa, Indian politician

== See also ==
- Khalisa (disambiguation)
- Dal Khalsa (disambiguation)
- Sikh Army (disambiguation)
- Amrit Sanskar, baptism in Sikhism
- Kalsa, a quarter of Palermo, Sicily
- Kalša, a village and municipality in Slovakia
