= Dal Khalsa =

Dal Khalsa may refer to:

- Dal Khalsa (Sikh Army), the Sikh army that operated in 18th-century Punjab
- Dal Khalsa (International), a Sikh political organization based in Amritsar, Punjab, India

== See also ==
- Khalsa (disambiguation)
