= Khalisa =

Khalisa may refer to:

- Khalsa, derived from Arabic "khalisa" meaning pure, a term for baptized Sikhs collectively
- Khalistan, meaning "land of the pure", a Sikh separatist movement in India
- Kalsa, historically known as Khalisa, a quarter in the Italian city of Palermo
- Noyakert, formerly known as Khalisa, a town in Armenia
- Khalisa, a neighbourhood of the Israeli city of Haifa
- al-Khalisa, a former village in Palestine

== See also ==
- Khalsa (disambiguation)
- Al Khalis, a town in Iraq
