= Jagir =

Feudal land grant in South Asia started in 13th century

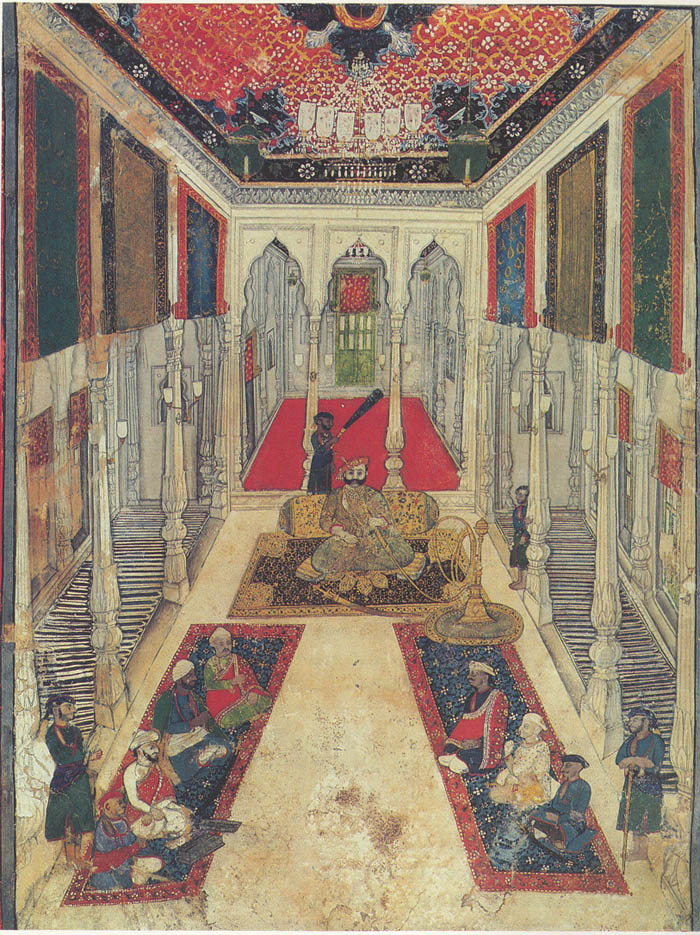
A Maratha Durbar showing the Chief (Raja) and the nobles (Sardars, Jagirdars, Istamuradars and Mankaris) of the state.

A jagir (Persian: جاگیر, romanized: Jāgir, Hindustani: जागीर/جاگیر, Jāgīr, Marathi: जहागीर, Jahāgīrá) also spelled as jageer, was a type of feudal land grant in the Indian subcontinent at the foundation of its Jagirdar (Zamindar) system. It developed during the Islamic era of the Indian subcontinent, starting in the early 13th century, wherein the powers to govern and collect tax from an estate was granted to an appointee of the state. The tenants were considered to be in the servitude of the jagirdar. There were two forms of jagir, one conditional, the other unconditional. The conditional jagir required the governing family to maintain troops and provide their service to the state when asked. The land grant, called iqta'a, was usually for a holder's lifetime; the land reverted to the state upon the death of the jagirdar.

The jagirdar system was introduced by the Delhi Sultanate, and continued during the Mughal Empire, but with a difference. In the Mughal times, the jagirdar collected taxes which paid his salary and the rest to the Mughal treasury, while the administration and military authority was given to a separate Mughal appointee. After the collapse and takeover of Mughals, the system of jagirs was retained by Marathas, Rajputs, Jats and Sikh jat kingdoms, and later in a form by the British East India Company.

== Definition ==
Jagir (Persian: جاگیر, Hindustani: जागीर/جاگیردار, Marathi: जहागीर, Bengali: জায়গীর) is a Persian word meaning 'place holder'.

In its 1955 judgment of the case Thakur Amar Singhji v. State Of Rajasthan, the Supreme Court of India used the following definition of jagir in interpreting the Rajasthan Land Reforms and Resumption of Jagirs Act (Rajasthan Act VI of 1952):

The word 'jagir' connoted originally grants made by Rajput Rulers to their clansmen for military services rendered or to be rendered. Later on grants made for religious and charitable purposes and even to non-Rajputs were called jagirs, and both in its popular sense and legislative practice, the word jagir came to be used as connoting all grants which conferred on the grantees rights in respect of land revenue, and that is the sense in which the word jagir should be construed ...

— Singhji v. Rajasthan, (15 April 1955; SCR 1955 2 303; AIR 1955 SC 504)

== Succession ==
A jagir was technically a feudal life estate, as the grant reverted to the state upon the jagirdar's death. However, in practice, jagirs became a hereditary position. The family was thus the de facto ruler of the territory, earned income from part of the tax revenues and delivered the rest to the treasury of the state during the Islamic rule period, and later in parts of India that came under Afghan, Sikh and Rajput rulers. The jagirdar did not act alone but appointed administrative layers for revenue collection. These positions, according to Shakti Kak, were called, among other titles, patwari, tahsildar, amil, fotedar, munsif, qanungo, chaudhri, and dewan.

== 13th-century origin and successors ==
This feudal system of land ownership is referred to as the jagirdar system. The system was introduced by the Sultans of Delhi from the 13th century onwards, was later adopted by the Mughal Empire, the Maratha Empire and continued under the British East India Company.

Some Hindu jagirdars were converted into Muslim vassal states under Mughal imperial sway, such as the nawabs of Kurnool. Most princely states of India during the colonial British Raj era were jagirdars such as Mohrampur Jagir. Shortly following independence from the British Crown in 1947, the jagirdar system was abolished by the Indian government in 1951.

== See also ==
- Indian honorifics
- Desmukh
- Indian feudalism
- Feudalism in Pakistan
- Kulkarni
- Lambardar
- Mankari
- Mansabdar
- Patil
- Saranjamdar
- Sardar
- Zamindar
- Ghatwals and Mulraiyats
