= William Harrison Moreland =

British civil servant

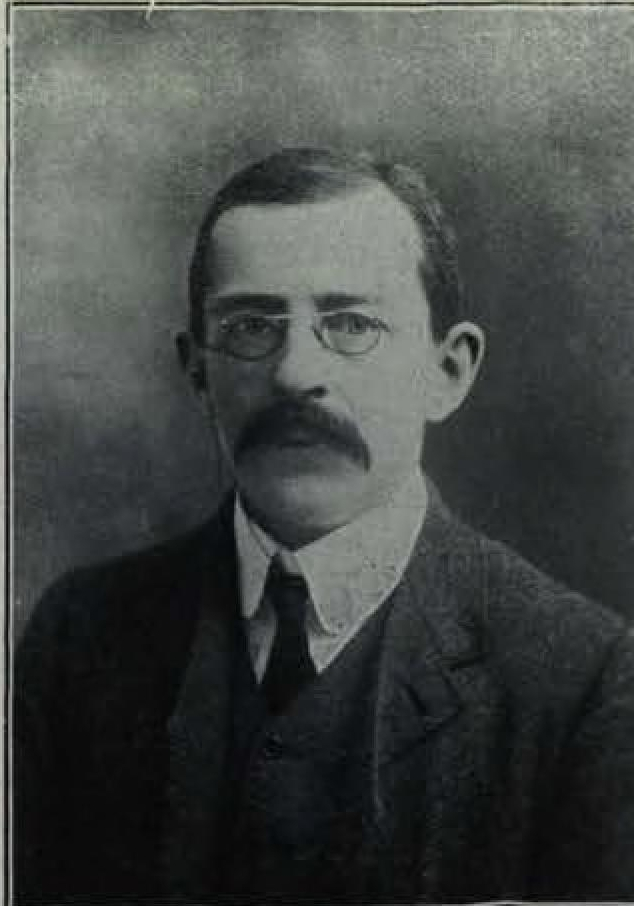
c. 1907

William Harrison Moreland CSI CIE (13 July 1868 – 28 September 1938) was a British civil servant who served in the Indian Civil Service and wrote several books on the economic history of India based on Mughal, Dutch, and Portuguese sources.

Moreland was born in Belfast, Ireland, son of William Harrison of Glen House, Crawfordsburn. He studied at Clifton College, Somerset (1881-1886) and joined the Indian Civil Services spending probation studying at Trinity College, Cambridge and receiving an LL.B. in 1889 after which he went to India. He served as assistant commissioner (1894), joint magistrate (1897), magistrate and collector (1899) and became Director of Land Records and Agriculture in the United Provinces in 1899. He simplified the system of land revenue. He retired in 1914 due to loss of hearing but worked as an advisor in Central India for two years. Returning to England, he began to study the economic history of India.

He published several books including:

- The Agriculture of the United Provinces (1904, 1912 2e)
- The Revenue Administration of the United Provinces (1911)
- An Introduction to Economics for Indian Students (1913)
- India at the death of Akbar (1920)
- India from Akbar to Aurangzeb (1923)
- Jahangir’s India, the Remonstrantie of Francisco Pelsaert (1925) translated with P. Geyl
- The Agrarian System of Moslem India (1929)
- Peter Floris, His Voyages to the East Indies in the Globe, 1611-1615; the Contemporary Translation of his Journal (1934) (editor)
- A Short History of India (1936) with Sir Atul Chandra Chatterjee

He also published numerous short papers; a full bibliography is included in Case (1965).

Moreland was made CIE (1905) and CSI (1912). He died at Gerrards Cross.
