= Mughal fiscal system =

Land revenue and taxation apparatus of the Mughal Empire (1526–1858)

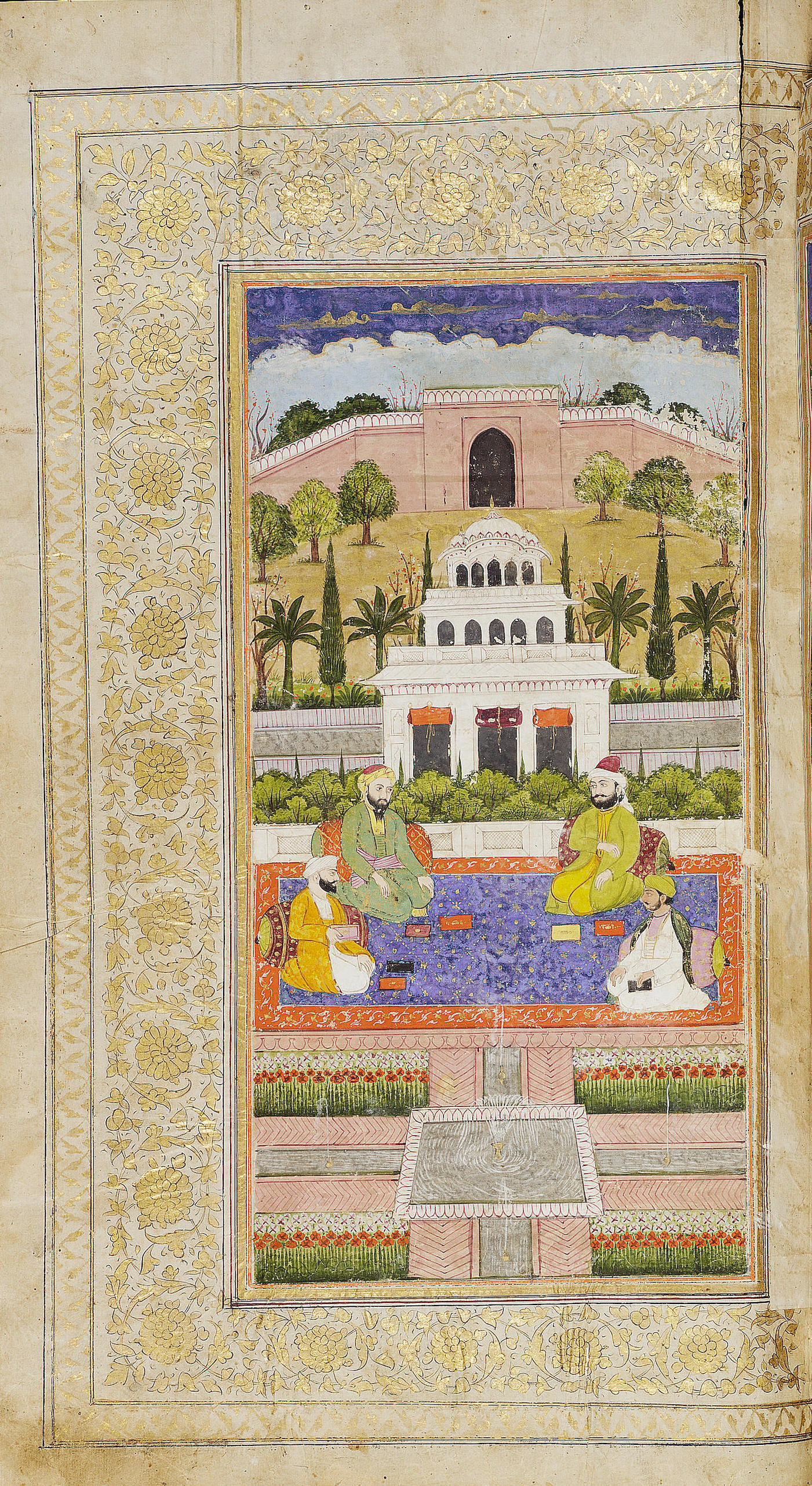
- Later illustrated manuscript of Abu'l-Fazl with the completed chronicles. The Ain-i-Akbari is the main contemporary record for Akbar's fiscal administration. zabt–dahsala revenue system.

Territorial scope
- Empire: Mughal Empire
- Period: c. 1526–1858 (mature form c. 1580–1707)

Fiscal architecture
- Assessment systems: Zabt · Dahsala · Nasaq · Kankut · Ghalla-bakhshi · Battai
- Principal coinage: Mohur (gold) · Silver rupee · Dam (copper)
- Assignment system: Mansab–jagir

Administration
- Imperial head: Diwan-i-Ala (occasionally titled Wazir)
- Provincial head: Diwan-i-Suba
- Principal architect: Raja Todar Mal, finance minister to Akbar

Record
- Principal primary source: Ain-i-Akbari (c. 1595)
- Imperial jama (c. 1595): c. 3.62 arab dams (c. ₹10.15 crore)

The Mughal fiscal system was the land-revenue, taxation, and expenditure apparatus of the Mughal Empire in the Indian subcontinent from the early sixteenth to the mid-nineteenth century. Centred on a cash-denominated land tax (jama) that funded a ranked nobility (mansabdars) through revocable revenue assignments (jagirs), the system reached its mature form under Akbar (r. 1556–1605) and his finance minister Raja Todar Mal, whose measurement-based zabt and ten-year dahsala settlements of the 1580s were recorded in the Ain-i-Akbari of Abu'l-Fazl. Its architecture drew on Delhi Sultanate and Suri precedents but was re-engineered into a uniform cash assessment keyed to pargana-level schedules of rates (dastur-ul-amals).

At its core were four interlocking institutions: a measured land tax, assessed on average produce and collected primarily in silver rupees; a graded service elite whose dhat and suwar ranks fixed both status and military obligation; a system of revocable assignments that transferred the right to realise the tax from a defined territory in lieu of salary; and an imperial demesne (khalisa) whose collections flowed directly to the imperial treasury. Imperial finance was directed by the diwan-i-ala, provincial finance by the diwan-i-suba, and collection at the district and pargana levels by amils, karoris, qanungos, and chaudhuris.

The system was never uniform across the empire. Zabt and dahsala were enforced comprehensively only across the Hindustani core of Agra, Delhi, Lahore, Multan, Allahabad, Awadh, Ajmer, and Malwa; Bengal operated on nasaq estimate-assessment, the Deccan retained its pre-Mughal deshmukhi structures within an imperial framework, and hilly or newly conquered tracts used crop-sharing variants (ghalla-bakhshi, battai, kankut). The operational vocabulary itself, Persian-Arabic for the imperial chancery and Indic for the pargana register, was layered on Delhi Sultanate and Suri precedent rather than invented wholly under Akbar.

Non-agrarian revenue, including customs and transit dues (rahdari, dastak), the poll tax on non-Muslims (jizya) reintroduced by Aurangzeb in 1679, escheat on the estates of deceased nobles, and ceremonial presents (nazr and peshkash), supplemented the land tax but remained small relative to it. A bimetallic currency anchored on the silver rupee, gold mohur, and copper dam, heavily supplied by bullion imports from Spanish America and Japan from the late sixteenth century onward, monetised the vast bulk of revenue flows.

From the later seventeenth century the system entered a protracted crisis. Habib later identified the underlying mechanism as an agrarian crisis of the cultivator base, in which a high and rotating revenue demand produced peasant flight, zamindar militarisation, and a chronic gap between assessed (jama) and realised (hasil) revenue. The mismatch between the number of sanctioned jagirs and the assignable revenue available (bejagiri), combined with Aurangzeb's Deccan wars, zamindar revolts, and shifts in bullion flows, eroded fiscal coherence across much of the empire. After 1707 the imperial fiscal apparatus fragmented as successor states in Bengal, Awadh, Hyderabad, and the Maratha dominion retained its vocabulary while capturing its revenues. Nineteenth-century British settlements, notably Bengal's permanent settlement, the mahalwari system of the north, and the ryotwari regimes of the Deccan and south, took as their baseline the Mughal jama, its subah geography, and its terminology of zamindar, pargana, and mauza. Modern scholarship on the system was opened by W. H. Moreland's interwar studies, systematised by the Aligarh school around Irfan Habib, Satish Chandra, and Athar Ali, and complicated from the 1980s by Muzaffar Alam, Sanjay Subrahmanyam, and John F. Richards, who emphasised regional variation and the agency of provincial elites.

== Etymology and terminology ==
The Mughal revenue administration drew its vocabulary from Persian, Arabic, and Indic sources, layered onto inheritances from the Delhi Sultanate and Suri regimes. "Fiscal" is a modern analytical label with no single contemporary equivalent; the chancery of Akbar used mal (wealth, revenue) and kharaj (land tax) from standard Islamic administrative usage, alongside paired Persian coinages such as jama (the assessed demand, literally "total") and hasil (the realised collection, literally "what has come in").

Zabt, literally "regulation" or "discipline", denoted the measurement-based cash-assessment system that Raja Todar Mal systematised in the 1580s. Dahsala combined the Persian numeral dah ("ten") with sal ("year") and designated the rolling ten-year schedule of cash rates by pargana and crop first compiled around 1580. Alternative assessment modes retained their pre-Mughal senses: nasaq (an estimate or rendering of accounts, not fresh measurement), kankut (an Indic-origin word for visual appraisal of standing grain), ghalla-bakhshi ("grain-sharing" at the threshing floor), and battai (division of the harvested crop).

The graded service elite used a fused Mongol and Central Asian vocabulary. Mansab meant literally "post" or "office"; the Mughals converted it into a double-number designation combining dhat (personal rank) and suwar (horsemen to be maintained). Jagir ("holding place") denoted the revenue assignment that funded a mansabdar; the holder, a jagirdar, was not a landowner but a fixed-term assignee of the imperial tax. Khalisa or khalsa (clear, reserved) designated revenue retained by the crown rather than assigned. The divergence between these categories and European notions of freehold would later structure colonial debate over whether the Mughal state had been a taxing sovereign or a proprietor of the land itself.

== Historical background ==
=== Pre-Mughal antecedents ===
The fiscal institutions the Mughals inherited had developed over three centuries of Indo-Islamic rule. The Delhi Sultanate, particularly under Alauddin Khalji (r. 1296–1316), had already imposed a measured land tax of up to half the produce across the Indo-Gangetic core and had experimented with pargana-level standardisation; the iqta' assignment of revenue rights to cavalry commanders anticipated the later jagir in all but its bureaucratic apparatus. The Tughlaq dynasty under Muhammad bin Tughluq (r. 1325–1351) pressed cash assessment further but collapsed the Doab economy in the process, and the fifteenth-century successor sultanates of Malwa, Gujarat, Jaunpur, and Bengal developed regionally distinct revenue schedules that the later Mughal surveyors would have to reconcile.

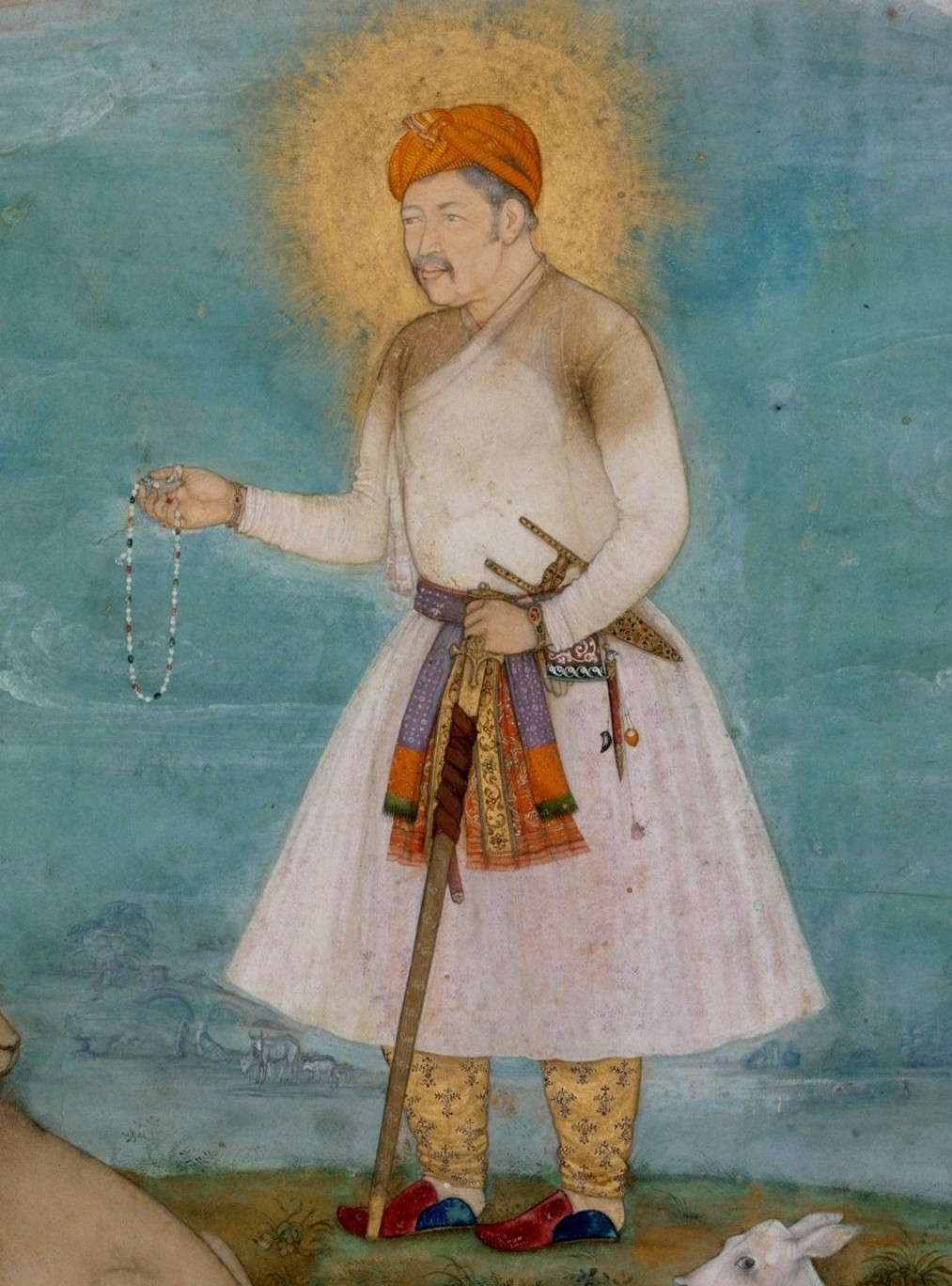
Akbar (r. 1556–1605), during whose reign the zabt and dahsala systems were codified. Miniature by Govardhan, c. 1630.

=== Babur and Humayun ===
The early Mughal regime lacked a distinctive fiscal system of its own. Babur's 1526–1530 conquests rested on spoils, indemnities from vanquished Afghan nobles, and the assessments inherited from Ibrahim Lodi's finance administration, which he instructed his officers to continue without disturbance. His son Humayun (r. 1530–1540, 1555–1556) retained these arrangements and experimented piecemeal with the distribution of jagirs among his Chaghatai and Persian nobles, but his defeats at the hands of Sher Shah Suri between 1539 and 1540 ended Mughal fiscal oversight north of the Indus for fifteen years.

=== The Suri interregnum and Sher Shah's settlement ===
The fiscal framework that Akbar inherited in 1556 was substantially the creation of Sher Shah Suri (r. 1540–1545) and his successor Islam Shah. Sher Shah ordered a measurement survey of the Doab using a standard bigha, assessed in cash at fixed rates by soil class and crop, and distinguished between the assessment nominally demanded from each village and the sum actually payable in cash after allowance for intermediaries. He also issued a reformed silver coin of 178 grains, the direct prototype of Akbar's rupee, which secured a stable monetary unit for the new assessments.

Many good men died from the severity of the exactions and the beatings, and many slew themselves in sheer desperation.

— 'Abd al-Qadir Badayuni, Muntakhab-ut-Tawarikh (trans. W. H. Lowe, 1884)

On regaining Delhi in 1555 Humayun and then Akbar took over this apparatus without immediate redesign. The early Akbari reforms of the 1560s consolidated Suri precedent: the karori experiment of 1574, which appointed revenue officials responsible for the collection of one karor (ten million) of dams each, collapsed within eight years amid famine and corruption, and Abu'l-Fazl's contemporary Abdul Qadir Badauni recorded that "many good men died" of the resulting exactions. The failure of the karori scheme prompted the more ambitious redesign of the 1580s that became the zabt–dahsala system.

== Structure and institutions ==
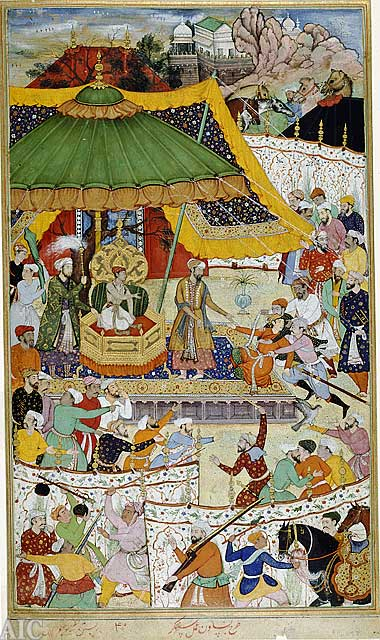
The court of Akbar, from the Akbarnama. Fiscal policy emanated from the imperial diwan under direct supervision of the emperor.

=== The imperial finance department ===
At the apex of the fiscal apparatus stood the diwan-i-ala (or diwan-i-kul, "supreme diwan"), an office usually identical with that of the wazir after Akbar abolished an independent vizierate in 1564. The diwan-i-ala supervised assessment, collection, the maintenance of the khalisa, the issue of jagir assignments through the khata-i-jagir register, and the audit of provincial accounts. Subordinate to the imperial diwan were the mustaufi (auditor general), the mushrif-i-mumalik (empire-wide accountant), and a pay office (bakhshi) that, after the military reorganisation of 1574, was formally distinct from the fiscal department but in practice interleaved with it because mansab pay and jagir revenue were two sides of the same ledger.

=== Provincial finance ===
Each of the twelve subahs recorded in the Ain-i-Akbari of c. 1595 (later enlarged to fifteen with the annexation of Berar, Khandesh, and Ahmadnagar) was administered by four parallel imperial officers: a subahdar or provincial governor with military authority, a diwan-i-suba for finance, a bakhshi for mansab pay-rolls, and a sadr for charitable grants. The deliberate separation of governor and diwan, both reporting directly to Agra or Delhi, was an administrative check against provincial fiscal autonomy; Akbar enforced it systematically from the 1580s.

=== District and pargana officers ===
Below the province the collection chain ran through the sarkar (district) and pargana (sub-district). Each sarkar had its own bakhshi and faujdar (with police and revenue-enforcement authority). At the pargana level the imperial officer was the amil (revenue collector), assisted by the karori (a revenue official nominally responsible for a quota of one karor of dams), the qanungo (local register-keeper), and the chaudhuri (representative of local landholders). The qanungo and chaudhuri were hereditary offices drawn from the zamindar class; their local knowledge made Mughal assessment viable but also created a structural dependency on intermediary elites whose cooperation was indispensable but never fully aligned with imperial interests. Contemporary observers such as Francisco Pelsaert and François Bernier singled out these intermediaries as the principal agents of fiscal oppression on the ground.

== Land revenue ==
Land revenue was the overwhelming source of Mughal state income; Shireen Moosvi's statistical reconstruction of the Ain-i-Akbari returns puts it at roughly nine-tenths of all recorded revenue in 1595, a proportion that persisted through the seventeenth century.

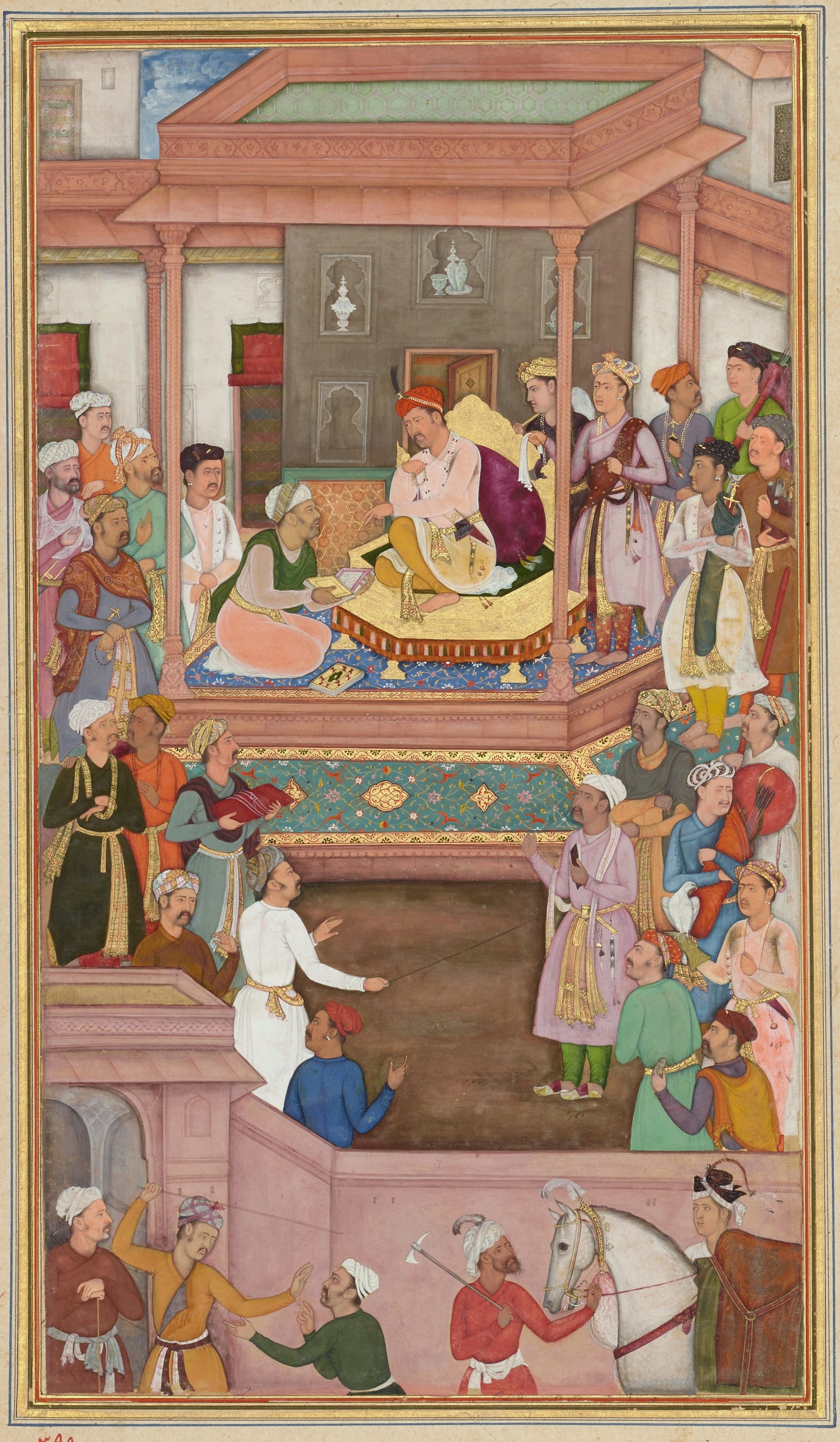
Abu'l-Fazl presenting the Akbarnama to Akbar. Its third book, the Ain-i-Akbari, recorded the cash rates per bigha on which the zabt assessment rested.

=== Measurement: the zabt system ===
The zabt system, systematised by Raja Todar Mal between 1582 and 1585, rested on three innovations. First, measurement of cultivated land in standardised bighas using the jarib (a rope surveying instrument later replaced by a bamboo rod fitted with iron rings). Second, classification of each plot into one of four categories — polaj (continuously cultivated), parauti (temporarily fallowed), chachar (long-fallowed, three to five years), and banjar (uncultivated more than five years) — with graduated incentives for restoring abandoned land. Third, recording of average produce per bigha for each crop and soil class over the preceding decade. The resulting schedules, the dastur-ul-amals, fixed a cash demand per bigha per crop for each pargana.

=== Assessment methods ===
Zabt, though archetypally Mughal, was never imposed uniformly across the empire. The Ain-i-Akbari records zabt only for the core zone of Agra, Delhi, Lahore, Multan, Allahabad, Awadh, Ajmer, and Malwa, where the cultivation pattern and ecological uniformity made fixed rate schedules workable. Outside this zone, collection proceeded by alternative methods:

- Nasaq (estimate or book-assessment) was the dominant method in Bengal throughout the Mughal period. It dispensed with fresh measurement and levied a cash demand based on prior years' realised revenue, adjusted upward or downward at the diwan's discretion.
- Ghalla-bakhshi and battai (both meaning "sharing") retained actual division of the grain heap at the threshing floor. Ghalla-bakhshi was the standard practice in forested, hilly, or newly conquered regions; battai was its equivalent in parts of central India and the Deccan.
- Kankut (visual appraisal) estimated the standing crop before harvest, applied where measurement was impractical but a cash demand was desired; it was common in Kashmir and the sub-Himalayan tracts.

Comparison of Mughal land-revenue assessment methods
Method	Literal meaning	Payment basis	Principal region
Zabt	Regulation	Cash per bigha per crop, fixed by ten-year dastur-ul-amal schedule	Hindustani core (Agra, Delhi, Lahore, Multan, Allahabad, Awadh, Ajmer, Malwa)
Nasaq	Estimate or rendering of accounts	Cash, adjusted from prior years' realised revenue at the diwan's discretion	Bengal throughout the Mughal period
Ghalla-bakhshi	Grain-sharing	Physical division of the grain heap at the threshing floor	Forested, hilly, and newly conquered tracts
Battai	Division	Physical division of the harvested crop	Central India and parts of the Deccan
Kankut	Visual appraisal	Cash demand estimated from the standing crop before harvest	Kashmir and the sub-Himalayan tracts

These methods coexisted; a single sarkar could contain parganas under different systems, and a revenue schedule for a given year could mix zabt, nasaq, and sharing.

These methods coexisted; a single sarkar could contain parganas under different systems, and a revenue schedule for a given year could mix zabt, nasaq, and sharing.

=== Rates and the jama-hasil distinction ===
The demand rate under zabt varied by crop and soil. Abu'l-Fazl records rates ranging from below one dam per bigha for inferior millets to more than two hundred dams per bigha for sugar-cane and indigo; the overall Mughal claim on the gross produce in the zabt zones has been calculated by Habib at roughly one-third and by Moosvi at approximately one-half in the richest parganas, with a mean across all regions nearer to one-third.

The distinction between jama (the assessed demand as booked) and hasil (the amount actually realised) was central to Mughal accounting. The Ain-i-Akbari records only the jama; the hasil was systematically lower, by margins that widened over the seventeenth century. Moosvi's analysis of the 1595 returns estimates the realised revenue at roughly 75–80 per cent of the booked jama in the zabt core. The gap between the two figures became, by the end of Aurangzeb's reign, one of the principal diagnostics of fiscal stress.

=== Collection cycle and safeguards ===
Collection followed the harvest cycle in two instalments: the kharif (autumn) crop was settled after the October–November harvest and the rabi (spring) crop after March–April. Payment was due in cash and, in principle, from individual cultivators, though in practice the zamindar or village headman handed over a consolidated sum on behalf of the community.

The system was protected by a dense apparatus of record-keeping. Each pargana maintained a daftar in Persian and in the Indian registers of the qanungo; balances, remissions, and arrears were tracked for every village and revised annually. Imperial directives repeatedly instructed collectors not to force cultivators to sell their produce to meet the cash demand, to allow remissions in years of famine, and to confine themselves to the scheduled rate; the persistence of these instructions across reigns indicates how often they were flouted.

== Mansabdari and jagir assignments ==
The ranked service elite of mansabdars, paid primarily by assignment of land revenue rather than from a central treasury, was the mechanism through which the fiscal system financed the military and civil establishment of the empire. The two systems, mansab and jagir, were conceptually distinct but in practice operated as a single ledger.

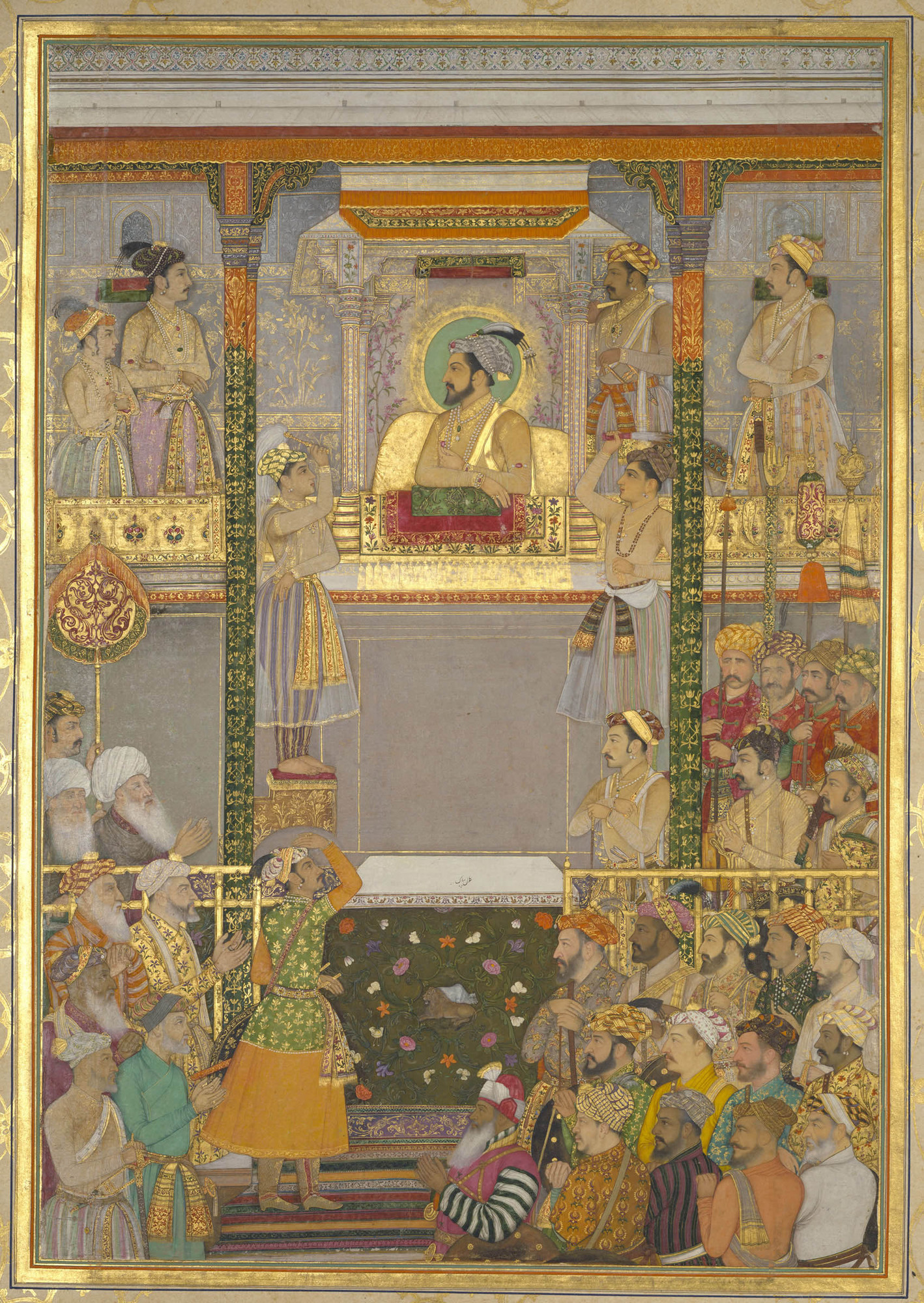
Shah Jahan's durbar from the Windsor Padshahnama, c. 1657. The tiered arrangement of nobles mirrored the dhat–suwar grades of the imperial mansab list.

=== The mansab: dhat and suwar ===
Akbar introduced the double rank of dhat and suwar in the mid-1590s, after earlier experiments with a single-number grade. The dhat (or zat) fixed the holder's personal rank, social precedence, and the notional salary; the suwar fixed the number of cavalry troopers to be maintained for imperial service. Ranks ran from 10 to 10,000, with the top grades reserved in practice for princes of the blood. The Ain-i-Akbari records several hundred senior rank-holders by the mid-1590s; the corps expanded substantially through the seventeenth century, reaching several thousand recorded mansabdars under Aurangzeb whose composition and grades are the subject of Athar Ali's register.

Ranks above 1,000 were normally salaried through jagir; below that, a combination of cash (naqdi) and jagir was possible, and ahadi troopers recruited individually by the emperor were paid in cash from the khalisa. Salary schedules were keyed both to the dhat rank and to the "month-scale" (mahana), a pro-rating mechanism that converted nominal annual pay into an effective monthly figure and through which the state absorbed most of the fiscal slack between jama and hasil.

=== Jagir categories and circulation ===
The imperial finance ministry distinguished three principal categories of jagir. Tankha jagirs were assignments given in lieu of salary and were transferable at the emperor's pleasure; the jagirdar typically held a given tankha for three to four years before being rotated to a fresh assignment. Watan jagirs were hereditary assignments granted to Rajput and other indigenous chiefs over their ancestral territories and, exceptionally, were not subject to transfer. Mashrut jagirs were conditional grants attached to a specific office, reverting to the crown on the office-holder's departure.

Principal categories of Mughal jagir
Type	Purpose	Transferability	Typical holder
Tankha	Assignment in lieu of salary	Transferable at the emperor's pleasure, typically every three to four years	Mansabdar of the imperial service
Watan	Hereditary assignment over ancestral territory	Not subject to transfer	Rajput and other indigenous chiefs
Mashrut	Conditional grant attached to a specific office	Reverts to the crown on the office-holder's departure	Officer holding a specified office

The circulation of jagirs (tankha and mashrut) was the central administrative operation of the Mughal state. A prospective assignment began with a proposal from the imperial diwan, matched against a file of vacant territories (paibaqi), and was ratified by an imperial farman identifying the jagir by its booked jama, not its realised yield. Assignees bore the risk that the hasil would fall below the jama, and Mughal practice from the mid-seventeenth century onward was to adjust nominal dhat and suwar numbers downward through the month-scale rather than to revise the jama itself.

Transfers were frequent to prevent jagirdars from entrenching themselves in a district and building independent bases. Abu'l-Fazl describes this rotation approvingly as an instrument of imperial oversight; later European observers, especially Bernier, read the same practice as a disincentive to investment and a structural cause of peasant poverty.

=== Khalisa: the imperial demesne ===
The revenue retained for the direct use of the crown, the khalisa-yi sharifa, was carved out of the booked jama of each subah and varied significantly across reigns. Under Akbar the khalisa reportedly held around a quarter of the imperial jama; by the reign of Shah Jahan it had fallen to perhaps one-seventh, as successful conquests had to be distributed in jagir to the enlarged nobility; Aurangzeb's Deccan wars returned briefly to a higher khalisa share in the late 1670s before the pressures of jagir demand pushed it back down. Khalisa income funded the central treasury, the imperial household, the ahadi cavalry, and the subsistence grants (madad-i-maʻash) issued to religious and scholarly beneficiaries, which themselves amounted to a small but politically significant fiscal outflow.

Approximate share of imperial jama retained as khalisa across reigns
Reign	Period	Khalisa share	Principal driver	Source
Akbar	1556–1605	Around one-quarter	Baseline after the zabt consolidation of the 1580s	
Shah Jahan	1627–1658	Around one-seventh	New conquests distributed as jagir to an enlarged nobility	
Aurangzeb (late 1670s)	c. 1677–1679	Briefly higher, before falling back	Deccan territory briefly returned to the crown before jagir demand reabsorbed it	

== Non-agrarian revenue ==
Non-agrarian receipts, though small relative to the land tax, accumulated to a significant share of imperial income and were disproportionately concentrated in the khalisa. Moosvi estimates that customs, mint profits, escheat, and miscellaneous levies together contributed between five and ten per cent of total receipts at Akbar's death, with higher shares in commercially dense parts of Gujarat and the Coromandel coast.

Principal non-agrarian revenue heads of the Mughal fiscal system
Head	Basis	Rate or principal data point	Source
Customs duties	Levy on goods at ports and overland frontiers	2.5 per cent for Muslim merchants; 3.5 to 5 per cent for others	
Transit dues (rahdari)	Levy on the overland movement of goods	Widely collected; specific parties exempted by dastak	
Poll tax (jizya)	Head tax on non-Muslim subjects, reimposed on 2 April 1679	48, 24, and 12 dirhams per year on rich, middling, and poor Hindu subjects respectively	
Escheat (khar mahal)	Imperial recovery of deceased mansabdars' estates	Residue after audit became imperial property, a regular source of concentrated cash	
Presents (nazr) and tribute (peshkash)	Ceremonial offerings at court, annual tribute from watan chiefs and tributary rulers	Reliable annual inflows; sizeable from Rajput chiefs and from Golconda and Bijapur before annexation	

=== Customs, transit dues, and market taxes ===
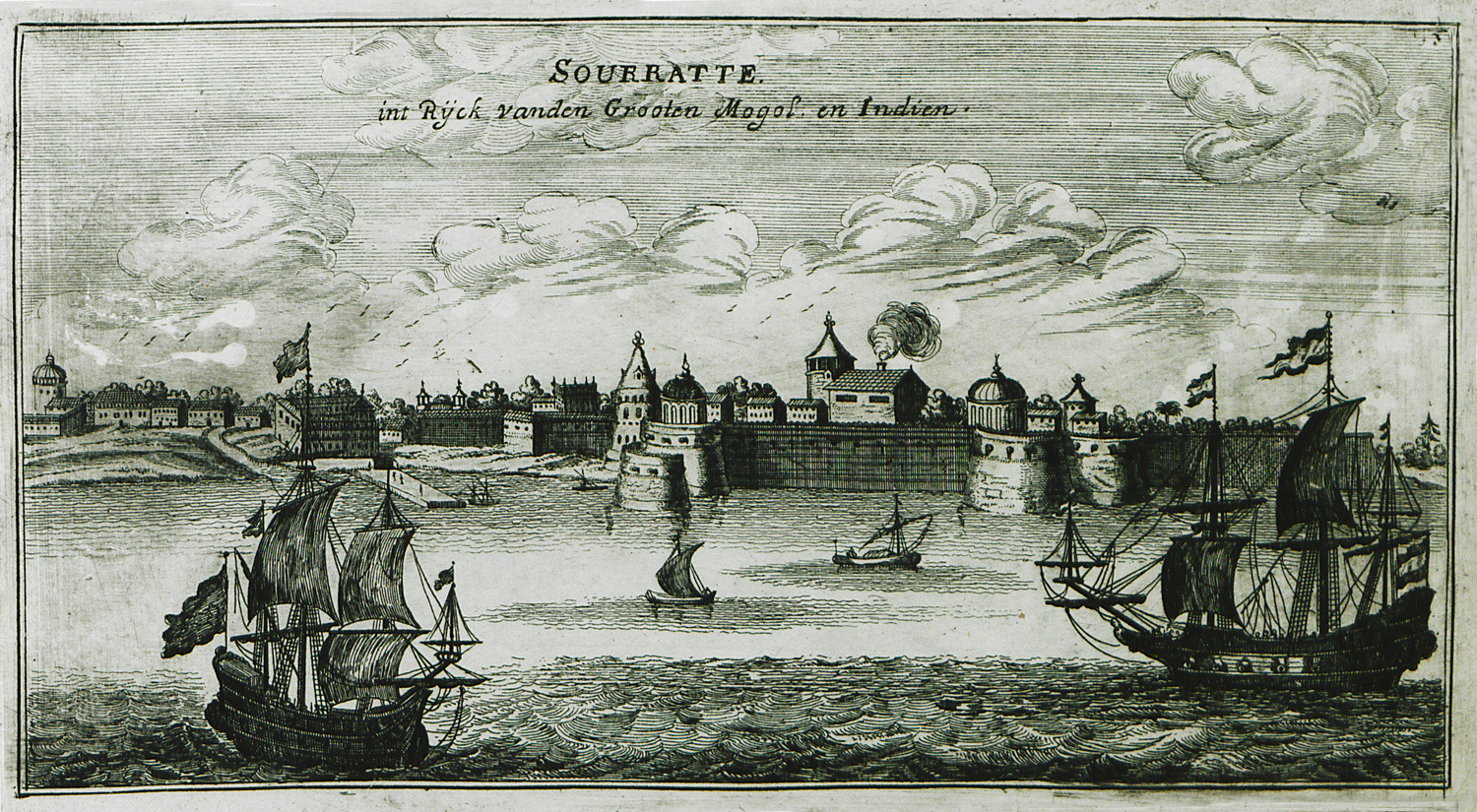
Surat in 1690 from Jacob Peeters. After its absorption in 1573 Surat was the empire's principal customs station and produced a single revenue stream large enough to fund substantial imperial disbursements.

Customs were levied at principal ports and overland frontiers, at rates ranging from 2.5 per cent for Muslim merchants to between 3.5 and 5 per cent for others; the differential was formally abolished by Akbar in 1580 but reintroduced in practice under Aurangzeb. Surat, after its absorption in 1573, became the empire's principal customs station and produced a single stream of revenue large enough to fund substantial imperial disbursements.

Transit dues (rahdari) and market taxes (zakat on trade, distinct from religious zakat) were smaller but ubiquitous. Jahangir issued dastaks or passes that exempted specified officials or merchants from transit dues, a practice that Francois Bernier and other travellers identified as a source of friction and corruption at provincial frontiers.

=== Jizya and its cycles ===
The poll tax on non-Muslims (jizya) was levied at the beginning of Mughal rule in continuity with Sultanate practice, abolished by Akbar in 1579 as part of his pluralist religious policy, and reimposed by Aurangzeb on 2 April 1679. Under Aurangzeb it was graded at 48, 24, and 12 dirhams per year on rich, middling, and poor Hindu subjects respectively, with women, children, the poor, and government servants exempt. The tax provoked a series of protests and zamindar revolts from 1679 to 1687 and was repealed after Aurangzeb's death. Its overall contribution to imperial revenues was modest, in the range of a few per cent of total receipts, but its political effects were out of proportion to its fiscal yield.

=== Escheat, presents, and prerogative claims ===
The crown's right of escheat (khar mahal or milkiyat-i-padshahi) over the accumulated wealth of deceased mansabdars was a distinctive feature of the Mughal fiscal system and a regular source of concentrated cash receipts. On the death of a high noble, imperial officers sealed the estate and an audit recovered unpaid advances, outstanding jagir dues, and the difference between assessed and realised revenue from the holder's last assignment; the residue became imperial property.

Ceremonial presents (nazr) at court audiences, and annual tribute (peshkash) from tributary rulers, together constituted a third class of non-agrarian receipt. While formally gifts, they operated as reliable annual inflows; the peshkash due from the watan-holding Rajput chiefs of Rajputana and the tributary rulers of Golconda and Bijapur before their annexations were particularly sizeable.

== Treasury and expenditure ==
The central treasury at Agra and, after 1648, Delhi, received the khalisa revenue, customs profits from a handful of major ports, escheat, and the produce of the imperial mints. By the reign of Shah Jahan the treasury operated across parallel stores for cash, jewels, and gold ingots; Manucci, Bernier, and Tavernier all record estimates of the accumulated treasure at his death that vary widely but agree on its exceptional size.

The principal outflow, by a wide margin, was military. The standing cavalry maintained by mansabdars did not appear in the imperial treasury's accounts except as the notional jama out of which it was paid, but the direct expenditures on the ahadi cavalry, the imperial artillery, and the building and manning of frontier forts were significant. Habib's estimates for Aurangzeb's reign suggest direct military expenditure absorbed between 50 and 70 per cent of khalisa disbursements in campaign years, rising in the late Deccan wars.

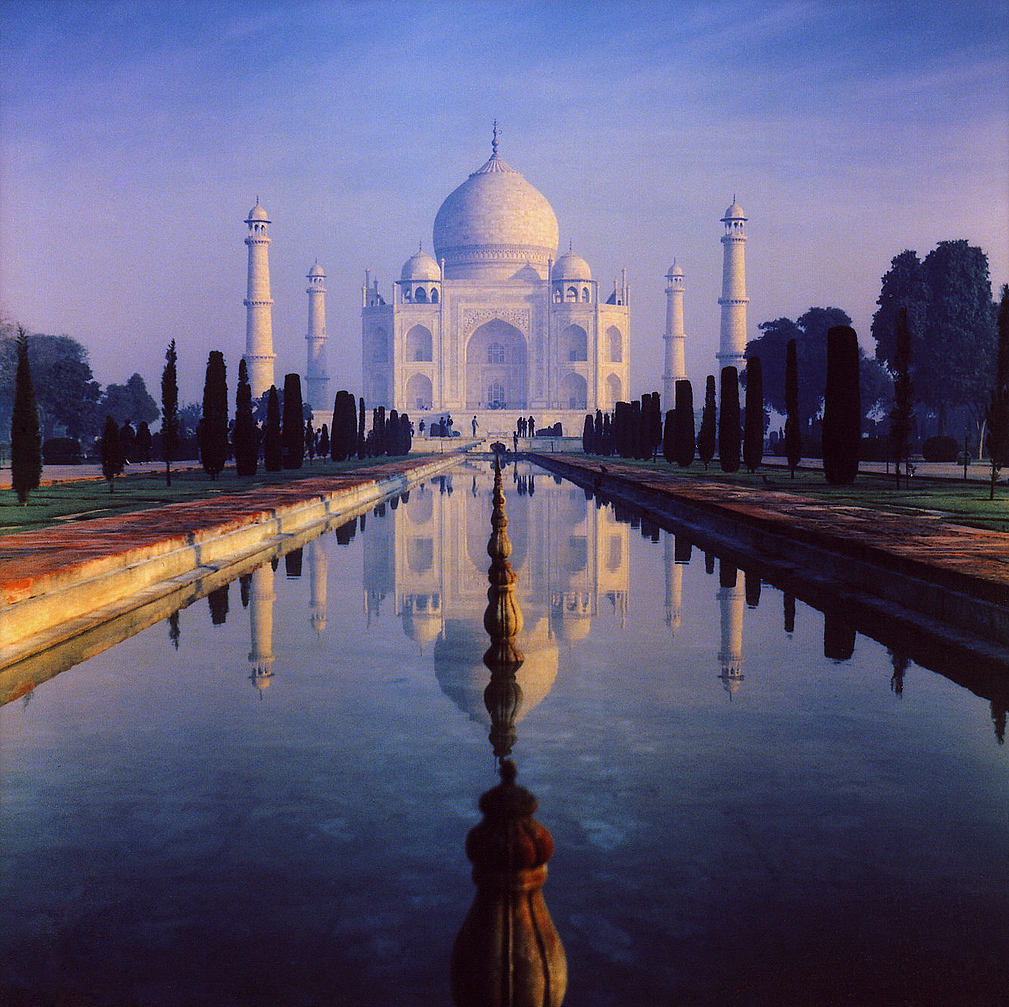
The Taj Mahal, funerary mausoleum of Shah Jahan and Mumtaz Mahal. The imperial construction programme, alongside the Red Fort at Delhi and the Lahore Fort, was financed out of surplus khalisa accumulation and dedicated waqfs.

Household expenditure on the imperial karkhanas (workshops producing textiles, arms, and luxury goods), the maintenance of the harem, stables, and elephant establishments, and court ceremonial was the second-largest outflow, supported by a sophisticated organisation under the khan-i-saman (steward of the household). Construction projects — the Taj Mahal and the Red Fort at Delhi under Shah Jahan, the Lahore Fort, and a dense programme of caravanserais and gardens — were financed out of surplus khalisa accumulation and from dedicated waqfs.

Provincial retention was a negotiated share. Each subah retained from its realised revenue the sums needed to pay locally stationed mansabdars, local establishments, and governor's expenses; the residue moved to the central treasury in annual or semi-annual remittances by overland caravan under military escort. The arz-daasht (petition) and siyaha (day-book) record an extensive correspondence between provincial diwans and the imperial centre over arrears, remissions, and the distribution of surplus between khalisa and jagir lands.

== Coinage and money ==
The Mughal fiscal system was, to an unusual degree for an early modern empire, a monetised system: land revenue was assessed and realised in cash, mansab salaries were nominally denominated in cash before conversion into jagir assignments, and customs, market taxes, and ceremonial receipts all flowed in coin.

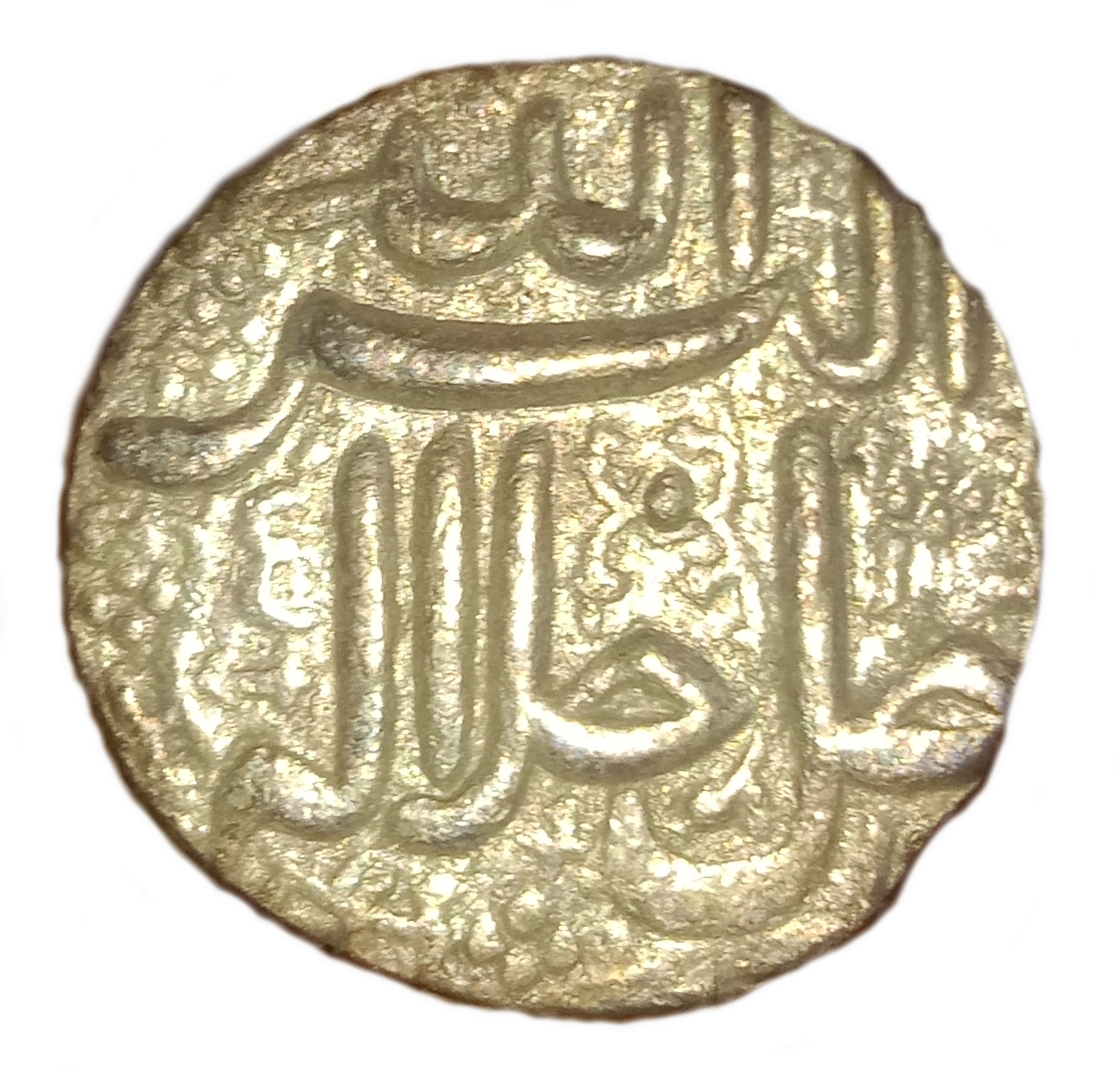
Silver rupee of Akbar, Ilahi type, regnal year 47, struck at the Ahmadabad mint. The 178-grain silver rupee was the principal unit of Mughal fiscal reckoning.

=== The silver rupee and Akbar's reform ===
Akbar's monetary reforms of 1577 and 1582 regularised the standards inherited from Sher Shah Suri. The silver rupee was fixed at 178 grains of pure silver (approximately 11.66 grams), struck across a network of imperial mints that the Ain-i-Akbari lists at more than forty locations by the 1590s. The rupee was divided into forty copper dams for accounting purposes, a ratio retained throughout the sixteenth and seventeenth centuries despite significant fluctuation in the actual market ratio, which by the second half of the seventeenth century had risen toward fifty dams per rupee under silver inflation.

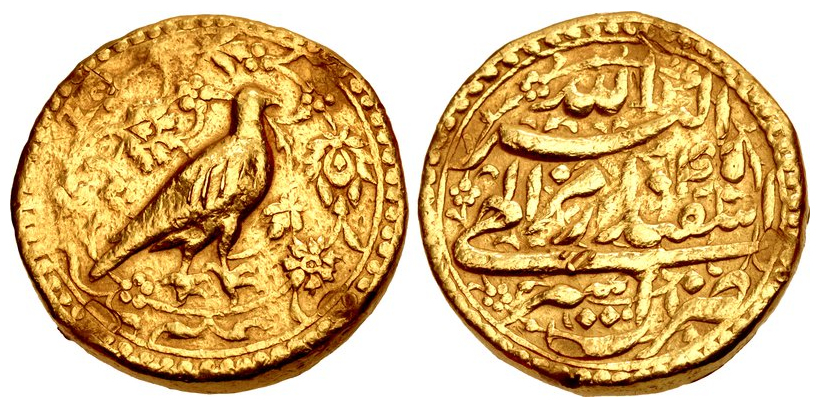
Gold mohur of Akbar, falcon type, Asir mint, Ilahi year 45 (AD 1600). The mohur served as the apex unit of the tri-metallic Mughal currency.

=== Gold mohur and copper dam ===
The gold mohur, weighing approximately 170 grains, was used for prestige payments, major court ceremonial, and the hoarding of accumulated surplus rather than for daily fiscal transactions. The famous series of twelve zodiac mohurs struck in 1618 under Jahangir is the best-documented example of the mohur as a ceremonial instrument; for revenue transactions mohurs were rare. The copper dam, at the opposite end of the value scale, was the coin in which pargana revenue accounts and the Ain-i-Akbari itself were kept, an administrative convention that reflected the dam's role as the unit of rate schedules rather than its role in physical payments.

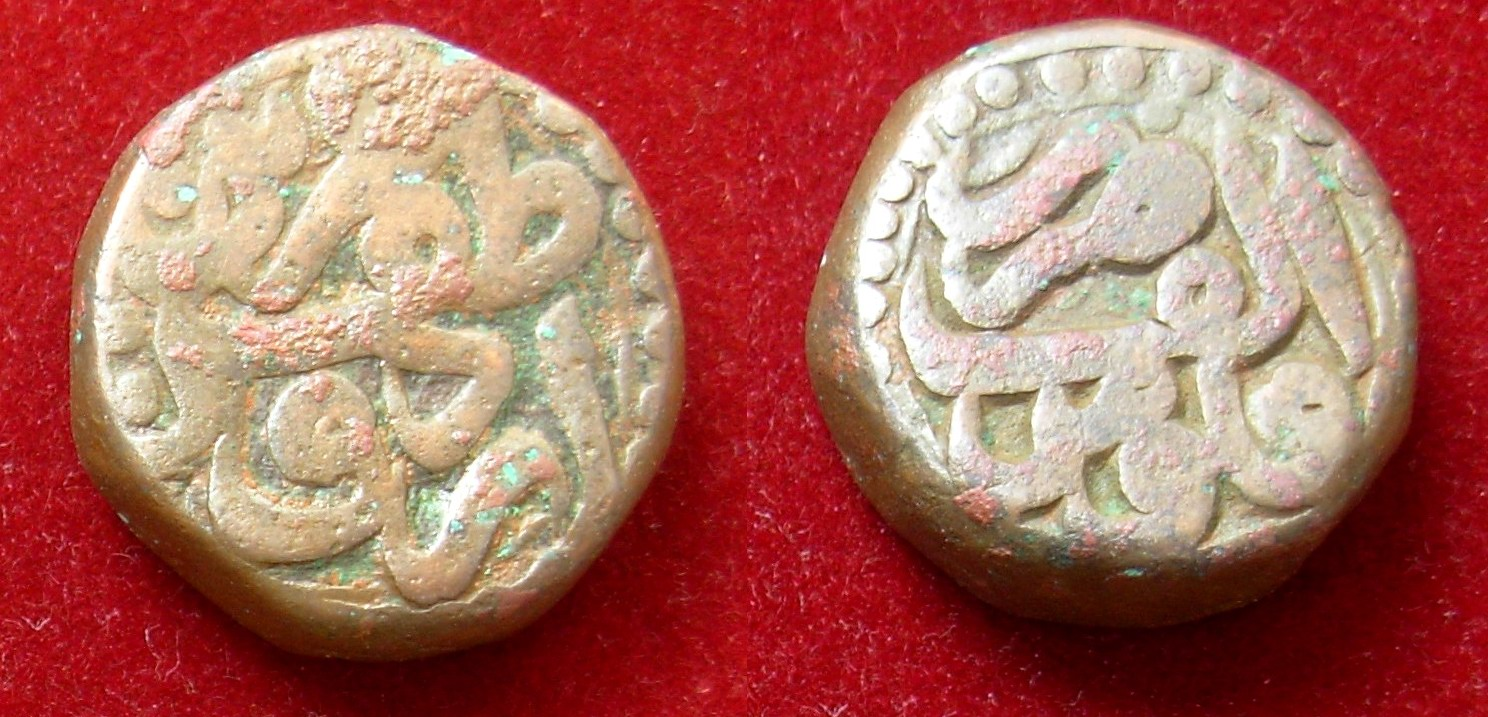
Copper dam of Akbar, AH 1000 (AD 1591–92). Forty dams equalled one silver rupee in Akbari accounting, and pargana revenue schedules were recorded in dams.

=== Bullion flows and the monetisation of revenue ===
The operation of a cash-based fiscal system on the scale of the Mughal empire depended on sustained net inflows of silver, the subcontinent being a net importer of monetary metal throughout the period. From the later sixteenth century onward, silver from Spanish America reached India via the Levant, Yemen, and the Cape Route; from the early seventeenth century, Japanese silver reached the Coromandel coast via Dutch and Portuguese intermediaries. Historians of the early modern monetary system estimate net silver inflows to India between the 1590s and the 1660s in the hundreds of millions of troy ounces, the bulk of it struck into rupees at the Mughal mints.

This inflow sustained the monetisation of revenue but also produced modest price inflation across the seventeenth century. Moosvi's reconstructed price series shows a doubling of the silver price of grain between 1595 and 1670 in the Agra region; rates fixed in cash per bigha under the Akbari dahsala thus lost real value unless revised, and the disjunction contributed to the late-seventeenth-century fiscal squeeze. A separate line of credit ran alongside the monetary system: the hundi (bill of exchange) network, operated by bankers (sarrafs) based in Surat, Ahmadabad, Agra, and Patna, allowed the state to transfer large sums between treasuries without the physical movement of coin and became an essential instrument of imperial fiscal liquidity.

== Crisis and evolution ==
The late seventeenth-century crisis of the Mughal fiscal system has been the single most contested problem in the field since the 1950s. Its main elements are widely agreed; their relative weight and their deeper causes remain subjects of debate.

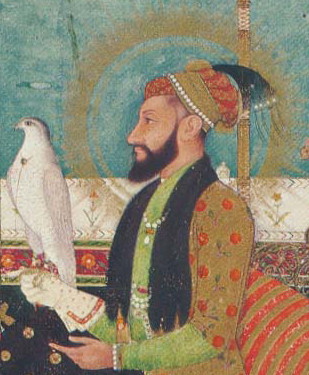
Aurangzeb (r. 1658–1707), under whose reign the jagirdari crisis exposed the limits of the mansab–jagir framework.

=== Expansion and the Deccan wars ===
Aurangzeb's conquests of Bijapur (1686) and Golconda (1687), followed by a protracted campaign against the Marathas in the Deccan that lasted until his death in 1707, produced a major territorial expansion but at disproportionate fiscal cost. The incorporated Deccan revenues were nominally large but actually realised only partially, and the war-time subsistence of the imperial army absorbed a growing share of receipts.

=== The jagirdari crisis ===
The term jagirdari crisis was given its classic formulation by Athar Ali in The Mughal Nobility under Aurangzeb (1966). Ali argued that between roughly 1660 and 1707 the gap between the number of jagirs required to pay the swollen mansabdar corps and the jagirs actually available from assignable territory became systemic. Aurangzeb's recruitment of Maratha and Deccani nobles during the Deccan wars intensified the imbalance; the shortfall, registered in imperial records as bejagiri (absence of jagir), produced a queue of officers waiting for assignment and depressed the effective salary of those who held them. Irfan Habib's Agrarian System (1963) reached the same conclusion by a different route, arguing that rising rate schedules and widening jama-hasil gaps provoked zamindar and peasant revolts that in turn compounded the pressure on assignable revenue.

Satish Chandra's Parties and Politics (1959) added a factional dimension, arguing that the competition among Irani, Turani, and indigenous court factions for a shrinking pool of profitable jagirs was a principal mechanism by which the crisis translated into political fragmentation after 1707.

=== Silver and bullion crisis ===
A parallel monetary dimension of the crisis was argued by Najaf Haider and others in the 1990s, building on Moosvi's earlier price data. The thesis holds that a slackening of silver inflows from the Americas and Japan after roughly 1660, compounded by the fiscal drain of the Deccan wars, reduced the net silver supply and depressed the effective real revenue collected. The rupee itself was briefly debased in weight and fineness in the 1670s before being restored.

=== Fragmentation, 1707–1761 ===
After Aurangzeb's death in 1707 the imperial fiscal apparatus fragmented rather than collapsed. The Bengal Subah under Murshid Quli Khan established a de facto autonomous fiscal regime that remitted a fixed annual tribute to Delhi and retained the residue; Awadh under Saadat Khan (from 1722) and Hyderabad under Asaf Jah I (from 1724) did the same. Muzaffar Alam's Crisis of Empire (1986) demonstrated that these successor regimes preserved almost the entire Mughal fiscal vocabulary, including jama, hasil, mansab, jagir, and khalisa, even as they captured the revenues. The final blow to imperial finance was the sack of Delhi and the seizure of the accumulated treasure by Nadir Shah in 1739, which ended the last significant concentration of cash at the centre; the rise of the Maratha confederacy in the 1740s and 1750s captured the bulk of the remaining revenue streams of northern and central India.

== Regional variations ==
The fiscal system was never homogeneous, and regional variations were part of its design.

=== The Hindustani core ===
Across the subahs of Agra, Delhi, Lahore, Multan, Allahabad, Awadh, Ajmer, and Malwa, the zabt-dahsala system operated at its fullest. Measurement, cash assessment, and ten-year rate schedules were enforced, pargana accounts were maintained in Persian and Hindi, and the flow between khalisa and jagir was closely monitored.

=== Bengal ===
Bengal operated on nasaq throughout the Mughal period; the richness of its alluvium, the capacity of its trade-linked monetary economy, and the political influence of its diwanate under Murshid Quli Khan after 1700 made it the empire's single largest fiscal asset but also the one most institutionally distinct.

=== The Deccan ===
The annexations of Berar (1596), Khandesh (1600), and Ahmadnagar (1601–1636), and the later conquest of Bijapur and Golconda, integrated into the fiscal system regimes with their own nibhayat and deshmukhi institutions. Mughal practice at first retained these structures, interposing only the imperial diwan and the mansab-jagir framework; the full imposition of zabt proved impossible.

=== Gujarat and Malwa ===
Gujarat's commercial economy made it disproportionately productive of customs and mint-profit revenue rather than agricultural jama; Malwa was the empire's principal source of opium revenue and of bulk grain for imperial markets. Both provinces retained pre-Mughal revenue institutions alongside zabt, and both became flashpoints during the succession wars of the early eighteenth century.

== Historiography ==
The modern historiography of the Mughal fiscal system begins with W. H. Moreland's interwar trilogy and has been structured since the 1950s by a dialogue between the Aligarh school and its critics.

=== Moreland and the early twentieth-century baseline ===
W. H. Moreland's three monographs, India at the Death of Akbar (1920), From Akbar to Aurangzeb (1923), and The Agrarian System of Moslem India (1929), established the basic periodisation and vocabulary later scholarship would use. Drawing on Blochmann's and Jarrett's translations of the Ain-i-Akbari, on Persian chronicles, and on the commercial records of the English and Dutch East India Companies, Moreland reconstructed a quantitative picture of Akbar's 1595 assessments and argued that the system had declined through the seventeenth century under fiscal and demographic pressure. His 1929 Agrarian System was also the first sustained argument that Indo-Islamic revenue practice had continuities across the Sultanate, Suri, and Mughal periods.

=== The Aligarh school ===
From the 1950s the Aligarh Muslim University history faculty, around Irfan Habib, Satish Chandra, Athar Ali, and later Shireen Moosvi, produced a comprehensive rewriting of the subject. Habib's The Agrarian System of Mughal India (1963; revised 1999) became the definitive study of land revenue and its social relations, arguing that the high rate schedules of the later seventeenth century precipitated peasant and zamindar revolts that in turn drove political fragmentation. Ali's Mughal Nobility under Aurangzeb (1966) gave the jagirdari crisis its classical formulation; Chandra's Parties and Politics (1959) linked fiscal pressure to faction; Moosvi's statistical reconstruction of 1987 put the Ain-i-Akbari returns on a quantitative footing.

=== Revisionist and Cambridge critiques ===
From the 1980s a loosely associated group of scholars, many based at Cambridge and elsewhere, pressed a series of qualifications. Muzaffar Alam's Crisis of Empire (1986), John F. Richards's volume in the New Cambridge History of India (1993), and the Sanjay Subrahmanyam and Alam-edited collection The Mughal State 1526–1750 (1998) argued that the fiscal crisis was as much the expression of realigned regional elites capturing an intact system as of systemic breakdown, and that the Aligarh emphasis on central state structures underweighted provincial and sub-provincial agency. A related strand argued for a monetary and commercial rather than a strictly agrarian interpretation of the crisis, emphasising the role of bullion flows and banker networks.

=== Quantitative and regional turns ===
A third phase, active from the 1990s onward, has combined Moosvi-style quantitative reconstruction with regional depth: studies of Bengal under the diwanate of Murshid Quli Khan, of the Deccan's absorption into the Mughal framework, and of the hundi-credit networks that sustained cash remittance. Najaf Haider, Farhat Hasan, and others have contributed strands that are difficult to assimilate to the older Aligarh and Cambridge binary. Current work increasingly frames the Mughal fiscal system as a variable regional assemblage rather than a single imperial machine, while retaining the Aligarh-era estimates as a baseline.

== Legacy ==
=== Colonial land-revenue inheritance ===
The three principal British Indian revenue regimes of the nineteenth century were explicit reworkings of Mughal precedent rather than fresh creations. The Permanent Settlement of Bengal (1793) fixed a perpetual demand on the zamindars of the Mughal diwanate; the mahalwari system of the North-Western Provinces settled assessment on the Mughal mahal (estate or pargana division) using the dastur-ul-amal rate schedules as evidentiary baseline; the ryotwari system of the Madras Presidency and Bombay Presidency followed Thomas Munro's explicit rejection of the zamindar-intermediary model in favour of a direct assessment on the cultivator, but it retained the Mughal definition of the assessable bigha and of the crop classes. Scholars of British land-revenue debate, from Baden-Powell to Neil Rabitoy, have documented the constant recurrence in the settlement reports of explicit appeals to Akbari precedent.

=== Post-independence debates ===
After 1947 the post-independence Indian state abolished the zamindari and intermediary tenures that the colonial settlements had preserved, but the pargana-level land-revenue registers (khasra and khatauni) that underlay village administration in much of north India remained in use and retained significant amounts of Mughal-era pargana and mahal nomenclature. The historiographical argument over whether this constituted an "Indian feudalism" or a distinct fiscal-administrative formation dominated Indian medieval-history journals for a generation and remains a live question.

=== Persistent terminology ===
The fiscal vocabulary of the Mughal state survives across modern Indian, Pakistani, and Bangladeshi administrative languages. Zamindar, pargana, mahal, mauza, sarkar, subah, khalsa, inam, and their derivatives remain in current use; the pargana continues to designate an intermediate administrative unit in parts of Odisha and Jharkhand, and the silver rupee of Akbar's reform, under its later gold-standard and paper-standard successors, remains the currency name of five South Asian states.

== See also ==
- Economy of the Mughal Empire
- Mughal currency
- Jagirdari crisis
- Dahsala system
- Zabt
- Mansabdar
- Jagir
- Mughal successor states
- Shireen Moosvi
- Irfan Habib
- Permanent Settlement
- Mahalwari
- Ryotwari

== Sources ==
- Abu'l-Fazl (1873). The Ā'īn-i Akbarī, Volume 1. Translated by H. Blochmann. Calcutta: Asiatic Society of Bengal.
- Abu'l-Fazl (1891). The Ā'īn-i Akbarī, Volume 2. Translated by H. S. Jarrett. Calcutta: Asiatic Society of Bengal.
- Alam, Muzaffar (1986). The Crisis of Empire in Mughal North India: Awadh and the Punjab 1707–1748. Delhi: Oxford University Press.
- Alam, Muzaffar; Subrahmanyam, Sanjay, eds. (1998). The Mughal State 1526–1750. Oxford in India Readings: Themes in Indian History. Delhi: Oxford University Press. ISBN 978-0-19-565225-3.
- Ali, M. Athar (1997) [1966]. The Mughal Nobility under Aurangzeb (revised ed.). Delhi: Oxford University Press. ISBN 978-0-19-565599-5.
- Badauni, ʻAbd al-Qadir (1884). Muntakhabu-t-Tawarikh, Volume 2. Translated by W. H. Lowe. Calcutta: Asiatic Society of Bengal.
- Bernier, François (1934) [1891]. Travels in the Mogul Empire A.D. 1656–1668. Translated by Archibald Constable. Revised V. A. Smith. London: Oxford University Press.
- Chandra, Satish (2002) [1959]. Parties and Politics at the Mughal Court 1707–1740 (4th ed.). New Delhi: Oxford University Press. ISBN 978-0-19-565444-8.
- Habib, Irfan (1999) [1963]. The Agrarian System of Mughal India 1556–1707 (revised ed.). New Delhi: Oxford University Press. ISBN 978-0-19-562329-1.
- Jahangir (1909). Henry Beveridge (ed.). The Tūzuk-i-Jahāngīrī, or Memoirs of Jahāngīr, Volume 1. Translated by Alexander Rogers. London: Royal Asiatic Society.
- Manucci, Niccolao (1907). Storia do Mogor; or, Mogul India 1653–1708, Volume 2. Translated by William Irvine. London: John Murray.
- Moosvi, Shireen (1987). The Economy of the Mughal Empire c. 1595: A Statistical Study. Delhi: Oxford University Press. ISBN 978-0-19-561725-2.
- Moosvi, Shireen (2008). People, Taxation and Trade in Mughal India. New Delhi: Oxford University Press. ISBN 978-0-19-569315-7.
- Moreland, W. H. (1920). India at the Death of Akbar: An Economic Study. London: Macmillan.
- Moreland, W. H. (1923). From Akbar to Aurangzeb: A Study in Indian Economic History. London: Macmillan.
- Moreland, W. H. (1929). The Agrarian System of Moslem India: A Historical Essay with Appendices. Cambridge: W. Heffer.
- Pelsaert, Francisco (1925). Jahangir's India: The Remonstrantie of Francisco Pelsaert. Translated by W. H. Moreland; P. Geyl. Cambridge: W. Heffer.
- Raychaudhuri, Tapan; Habib, Irfan, eds. (1982). The Cambridge Economic History of India, Volume 1: c. 1200 – c. 1750. Cambridge: Cambridge University Press. doi:10.1017/CHOL9780521226929. ISBN 978-0-521-22692-9.
- Richards, John F. (1993). The Mughal Empire. The New Cambridge History of India, I.5. Cambridge: Cambridge University Press. ISBN 978-0-521-56603-2.
