= St. John's Church, Gorakhpur =

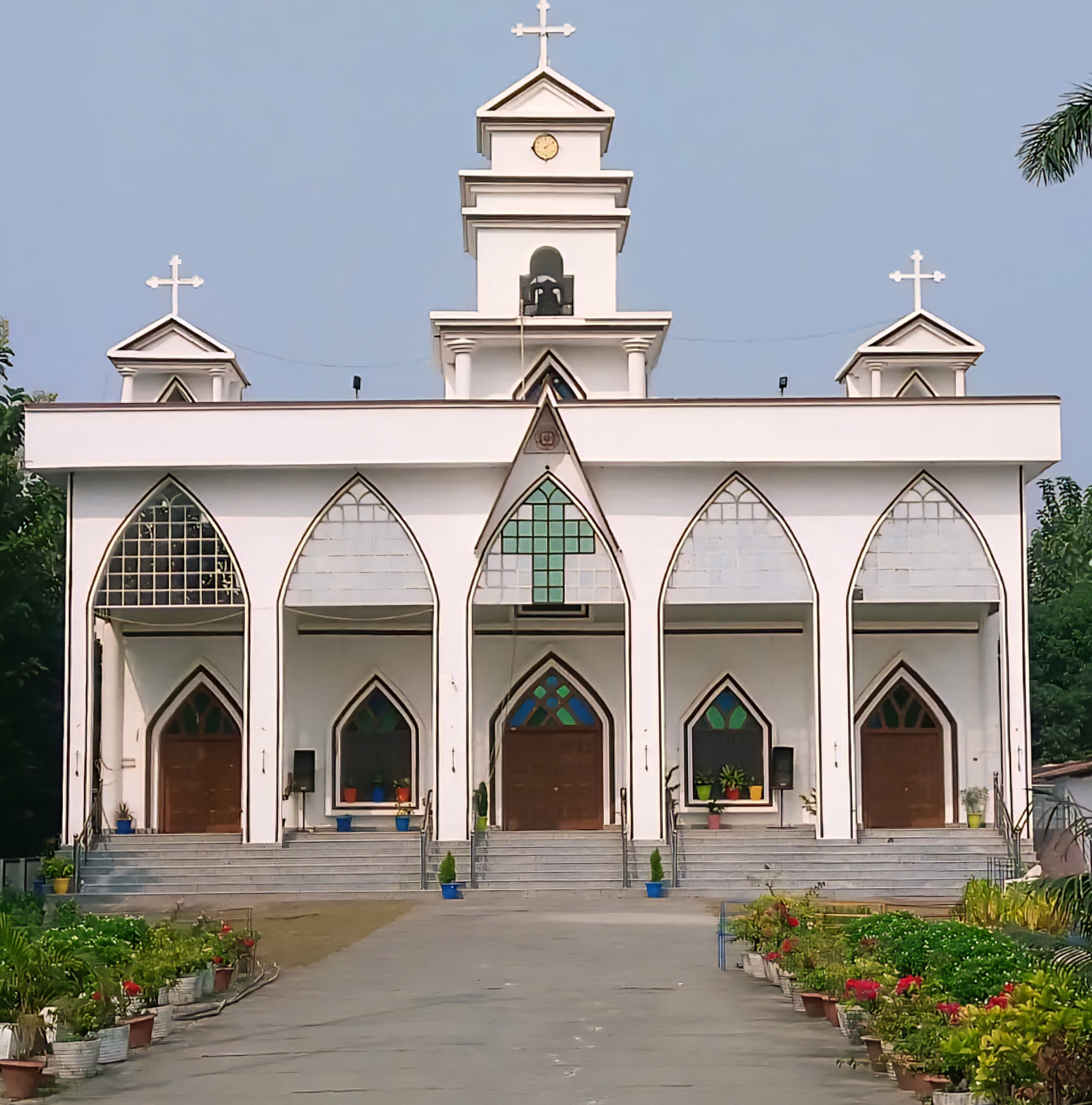
- St. John's Church, Gorakhpur
- St. John's Church, Gorakhpur
- 26.78535°N 83.38434°E
- Location: Basharatpur, Gorakhpur, Uttar Pradesh, pincode 273004,India
- Country: India
- Denomination: Church of North India
- Churchmanship: Protestant
- Website: stjohnschurchgkp.org

History
- Status: Church
- Founder(s): Rev. Michael Wilkinson (1797–1848), Church Missionary Society

Architecture
- Functional status: Active
- Architectural type: Church
- Style: Originally Gothic; later altered through renovation

Specifications
- Capacity: 1000

Administration
- Province: Church of North India
- Diocese: Lucknow
- Deanery: Gorakhpur Deanery
- Parish: Gorakhpur

Clergy
- Bishop: Rt. Rev. Moris Edgar Dan
- Vicar: Rev. Roshan Lal

St. John's Church, Gorakhpur is a Protestant church located in the Basharatpur region of Gorakhpur district, Uttar Pradesh, India. It is affiliated with the Church of North India and falls under the Diocese of Lucknow. The church has a seating capacity of approximately 1,000 people.

== History ==
Historical sources indicate that Christian mission activity began in Gorakhpur in the early 19th century. Robert Merttins Bird, who served as the Collector of Gorakhpur under the British administration and is known for his role in the Mahalwari land revenue system, is recorded to have requested the Church Missionary Society to send a missionary to the region, after which Rev. Michael Wilkinson was appointed to the station. Wilkinson is recorded as having begun his work in Gorakhpur by 1824. In 1828, Bishop Daniel Corrie noted in his journal that a new church was being built in Gorakhpur according to plans by Bishop Reginald Heber, although he did not specify its name. He also referenced the assistance of Mr. Wilkinson and Mr. Robert Merttins Bird, both known to have been active in the area at the time.

The church observes the Feast of the Nativity of John the Baptist, traditionally held on 24 June, as its foundation day.

Rev. Michael Wilkinson oversaw the construction of the church, initially named the "Church in the Wilderness," which was completed in 1832. The church was part of a mission settlement in Basharatpur, to establish an agricultural community. These converts cultivated land granted by Lord William Bentinck to support the mission. By 1846, the mission supported a congregation of 217 native Christians and schools educating over 300 children.

The original structure, constructed in the Gothic style, experienced damage during the Indian Rebellion of 1857. On 13 August 1857, the mission, including the church, was evacuated due to rebel threats, and the 162 native Christians were placed under the protection of a Hindu king named Raja Krishna Kishore Chand of Gopalpur. After the Rajah's deposition by Muslim rebels, the Christians fled Basharatpur on 20 October 1857, with 141 reaching Aligunje, near Chupra. The church and mission properties were damaged but restored after British forces reoccupied Gorakhpur, with the community returning under Rev. H. Stern. The church was subsequently repaired. In 2000, renovation efforts led to changes in the church's architectural appearance, incorporating contemporary elements while retaining some traditional features.

Additional documentation about the church's early activities in Basharatpur appears in 19th-century missionary publications, including *Missionary Sketches in North India* by F. Weitbrecht.

== Administration and Services ==
The Church is part of the Church of North India (CNI) and comes under the jurisdiction of the Diocese of Lucknow. The church falls within the Gorakhpur Deanery.

The Church of North India, established in 1970 through a union of several Protestant denominations, functions as a united church across northern and central India. It emphasizes mission, education, and community outreach across its dioceses.

The church conducts worship services in both Hindi and English. It hosts regular liturgical celebrations and community outreach activities, particularly during major Christian observances such as Easter and Christmas. The bicentenary of the church was marked in June 2023 through a series of religious and community programs.

== See also ==
- Mary Bird (author)
- Isabella Bird
- William Wilberforce Bird
