= Ryot =

Historical name for Indian peasant farmers

Ryot (alternatives: raiyat, rait or ravat) was a general economic term used throughout India for peasant cultivators but with variations in different provinces. While zamindars were landlords, raiyats were tenants and cultivators, and served as hired labour.

A raiyat was defined as someone who has acquired a right to hold land for the purpose of cultivating it, whether alone or by members of his family, hired servants, or partners. It also referred to succession rights.

== Etymology ==
Ryot originates from the Hindi-Urdu word ra`īyat and the Arabic word ra`īyah, translated as "flock" or "peasants", in turn originating from the word ra`ā, meaning "pasture".

== Classifications ==
Under the Mughal system of land control there were two types of raiyats: khudkasta and paikasta. The khudkasta raiyats were permanent resident cultivators of the village. Their rights in land were heritable according to Muslim and Hindu laws of succession. The other type of raiyats were called paikasta. They did not cultivate land on a permanent basis in any particular mauza (lowest revenue plus village settlement unit), but instead moved from mauza to mauza and engaged themselves for a crop season. In terms of revenue, the paikasta raiyats were generally paid a much lower rate of rent than the khudkashta raiyats. The dividend to the khudkasta, who thus became an absentee owner, came from hard bargaining. Pahikasht raiyats were a subgroup of peasants who cultivated the land away from the area where they resided.

Another subgroup included under-raiyats who were entitled to various rights of occupancy and transferable interests. An under-raiyat was referred to as a korfa, though an under-raiyat paying rent in kind was referred to as a bargait.

In March 1859, during the period of Company rule, thousands of ryots in Bengal refused to grow Indigo.

The Bengal Tenancy Act of 1885 was developed to regulate the rent of under-raiyats. One of the causes of the Bengal Tenancy Act of 1885 was the Bihar Rent Committee report of 1879 which sought rights for the raiyat to resist illegal restraint and illegal enhancement, and allowing him to prove and maintain his occupancy rights.

== Ryotwari system ==
There were two economic systems prevalent in India during the British rule: the ryotwari system and the mahalwari system. The ryotwari system was known as "severality villages" and based on the system of peasant proprietorship. The ryotwari (or ryotwary) tenure related to land revenue imposed on an individual or community owning an estate and occupied a position analogous to that of a landlord. The assessment was known as "zamindari".

The land revenue was imposed on individuals who are the actual occupants, and the assessment was known as "ryotwari". Under zamindari tenure, the land was held as independent property, and under ryotwari tenure, it was held of the crown in a right of occupancy, which under British rule was both heritable and transferable by the ryots. The former system prevailed in northern and central India and the latter in Bombay, Madras, Assam and Burma. The Ryot's association was formed by N. G. Ranga.
