= Holt Mackenzie =

British colonial administrator

Holt Mackenzie, PC (1786–1876) was a British colonial administrator in India.

The son of the Scottish writer Henry Mackenzie, Holt Mackenzie and of Penuel, daughter of Sir Ludovich Grant of Grant. He obtained an East India Company writership in July 1807 and rose steadily until he retired to England in 1831. In India, he was instrumental for setting up the Mahalwari system of land revenue.

After returning to England, he became a member of the Board of Control, and was sworn of the Privy Council in 1832. The same year, he stood unsuccessfully for Elgin Burghs.
