= Robert Merttins Bird =

British East India Company servant, father of land-revenue settlement in North India

Robert Merttins Bird (1788–1853) was a British civil servant in the Bengal Presidency. He is known for the far-reaching "Mahalwari" tax reform.

== Early life ==
He was the son of Robert and Lucy Bird of Taplow, Buckinghamshire; his younger brother Edward was the father of Isabella Bird. The marriage was of cousins, with the same surname, and there were four sons and six daughters. His sister was Mary Bird.

Bird entered the East India College, after preparation by a tutor, and with the support of George Smith; and passed out ninth in its first leaving class, the class of 1808. He arrived in India on 9 November 1808. There was more time in college, at Fort William, after which he took the judicial route, one of the two main specialisations for the civil servants of the East India Company. He began service as an assistant to the registrar of the Sadr Diwani Adalat in Calcutta.

The first mofussil (provincial) experience for Bird was a tour in 1813 with William Wilberforce Bird, a first cousin. It took him to the Benares area of North India. He was a magistrate and judge at Ghazipur from 1816 to 1826, then becoming judge at Gorakhpur, remaining in what is now northern Uttar Pradesh.During his tenure as Collector of Gorakhpur, Bird is noted for requesting the Church Missionary Society to send a missionary to the region, which led to the establishment of the Gorakhpur mission and the appointment of Rev. Michael Wilkinson in 1824. His first wife died in 1821, in the first cholera pandemic, leaving him with children to bring up, and his sister Mary came out from England to support him. He married again in 1824.

== Revenue officer ==
In 1829 Bird was transferred to the appointment of commissioner of revenue and circuit for the Gorakhpur division.

As a judicial officer, Bird had acquired insight into land ownership in India, and the impact on it of the legal framework. On his appointment as a revenue commissioner, he made a reputation, and when it was decided in 1833 to revise the settlement of the land revenue of the North-Western Provinces, Lord William Bentinck, the governor-general, chose Bird. Retaining his seat as a member of board of revenue recently constituted at Allahabad, he took sole charge of the settlement operations, which he brought to completion by the end of 1841. The conclusions were stated in a major report. Bird retired from the service in 1842, and was succeeded on the board of revenue by James Thomason.

== Later life ==
Bird spent the remainder of his life in England, where he was a member of the committee of the Church Missionary Society. A few months before his death, which occurred at Torquay on 22 August 1853, he gave evidence before the committee of the House of Commons on the renewal of the East India Company's charter.

== Report ==
Bird's work on land revenue was recorded in a report which he laid before government early in 1842. The settlement was the most complete that had yet been made in British India. It covered an area of 72,000 square miles (190,000 km^{2}), and a population of 23 million. In the report he explained that the work had not been confined to an accurate assessment of what could be taxed. It also included:

"the decision and demarcation of boundaries, the defining and recording the separate possession, rights, privileges, and liabilities of the members of those communities who hold their land in severalty; the framing a record of the several interests of those who hold their land in common; the providing a system of self-government for the communities; the rules framed with their own consent according to the principles of the constitution of the different tenures; the preparation of the record of the fields and of the rights of cultivators possessing rights; and the reform of the village accounts and completion of a plan of record by their own established accountants, and according to their own method, by reference to which the above points of possession and right might, under the various changes to which property is subject, continue to be ascertained."

A corresponding system of accounts for the offices of the tehsildars, and for those of the collectors of districts, was also framed. The revenue settlement for the North-West Provinces was praised by John Stuart Mill.

== Evangelical background ==
Bird, an evangelical Christian, supported the Church Missionary Society's work while still in India. By family background he was linked to the Wilberforces: his mother Lucy Wilberforce Bird was the sister of William Wilberforce Bird the Member of Parliament for Coventry; William Wilberforce was a close relation, Lucy being the daughter of his aunt Judith. He was joined in India in 1823 by his sister Mary Bird (1789–1834), who worked as a missionary. The second sister, Lucy, married in 1828 the Rev. Marmaduke Thompson, who had been in India from 1806 to 1819 as a chaplain nominated by Charles Simeon, returning as a widower to the United Kingdom.

William Bell Mackenzie wrote a preface to an edition in 1855 of writings on the Pentateuch, Bible Teaching, by three of Bird's sisters.

== Legacy ==
Penner identifies the "Bird-Thomason school" of officials that followed the approach laid down by Bird. It included, but was not limited to, George Campbell (1824–1892), John Russell Colvin, Frederick Currie, Robert Needham Cust, George Frederick Edmonstone, Henry Miers Elliot, John Laird Mair Lawrence, Charles Grenville Mansel, Robert Montgomery, William Muir, Edward Anderdon Reade, Richard Temple, and Edward Parry Thornton. Of those, Colvin, Cust, Lawrence, Mansel, Montgomery, Muir, Reade, Temple and Thornton are identified as evangelicals.

== Family ==
Bird married:

1. In 1810, Jane Grant Brown, daughter of the Rev. David Brown, who died in Gorakhpur on 6 September 1821;
2. In 1824 in Cape Town, Jane Bird, a first cousin as daughter of William Wilberforce Bird, comptroller of customs there, who died in Taplow in 1845;
3. In 1848, Henrietta Maria Jane Grenfell of Taplow. She was the fifth daughter of Pascoe Grenfell, and the wives of Charles Kingsley and James Froude were her sisters.

The eldest son of the first marriage was Robert Wilberforce Bird. Another son, Charles Robinson Bird, was rector of Castle Eden and father of Mary Bird, and of Harriet Amelia Scott Bird (1864–1934) who trained at the Edinburgh Medical College for Women, worked at Leith Hospital, married Robert William MacKenna and was mother of Robert Merttins Bird MacKenna, both physicians.

In 1833, Bird's sister, Elizabeth, married James Harington Evans, as his second wife. His daughter, Lucy Elizabeth (d.1835) was married to Sir Frederick Currie. In his will Bird made provision for five sons and three daughters. His fourth son, James Grant Bird, had died in 1849.

== See also ==
- St. John's Church, Gorakhpur
