= Ceded Districts =

Former Indian territory ceded to the British East India Company

- Area of British India
- 1800–1947
- Flag
- Capital: Bellary
- Government
- Collector
  - 1800–1807: Thomas Munro
- History
  - Districts ceded by the Nizam: 1800
  - Indian independence: 1947
| Preceded by | Succeeded by |
| Hyderabad State | Dominion of India |

The Ceded Districts were a collection of districts in the Deccan region of India that were ceded to the British East India Company by the Nizam Ali Khan, Asaf Jah II of Hyderabad State in 1800. The name was in use during the entire period of the British Raj, even though the denomination had no official weight for legal or administrative purposes. The area largely corresponds to the modern region of Rayalaseema in Andhra Pradesh.

== History ==
Following the Treaty of Seringapatam, Tippu Sultan agreed to give his northern territory to the Nizam of Hyderabad in 1792 AD.

In 1796 AD, Nizam Asaf Jah II, harassed by the Marathas and Tipu Sultan, opted to get British military protection under Lord Wellesley's doctrine of Subsidiary Alliance. As a part of this agreement, the Nizam ceded a large portion of the acquired territory to the British, to be added to the Madras Presidency. This area became known as the Ceded Districts, a term still used for the areas, and includes the present day districts of Anantapuram, Kadapa (Cuddapah), much of Karnoolu (Kurnool), Bellary, and parts of Tumkur (Pavagada taluk).

After the defeat and death of Tipu Sultan in the Fourth Anglo-Mysore War at Siege of Seringapatam (1799), the Mysooru (Mysore) territories(Map) were divided up among the Wodeyars, the Nizam and the British East India Company.
