= Ahadi =

Ahadi (Persian: احدی) is an Iranian surname. Notable people with the surname include:

- Ahadi (The Lion King), a character from the fictive world of The Lion King
- Mina Ahadi, Iranian Communist political activist
- Reza Ahadi, Iranian footballer

Ahadi is another way of saying promise in some other languages such as African languages.

== See also ==
- Pi Puppis, a star located in the constellation Puppis unofficially named Ahadi
- Ahad (disambiguation)
