= Sir Thomas Munro, 1st Baronet =

Madras Army officer and colonial administrator (1761–1827)

Major-General Sir Thomas Munro Bt KCB
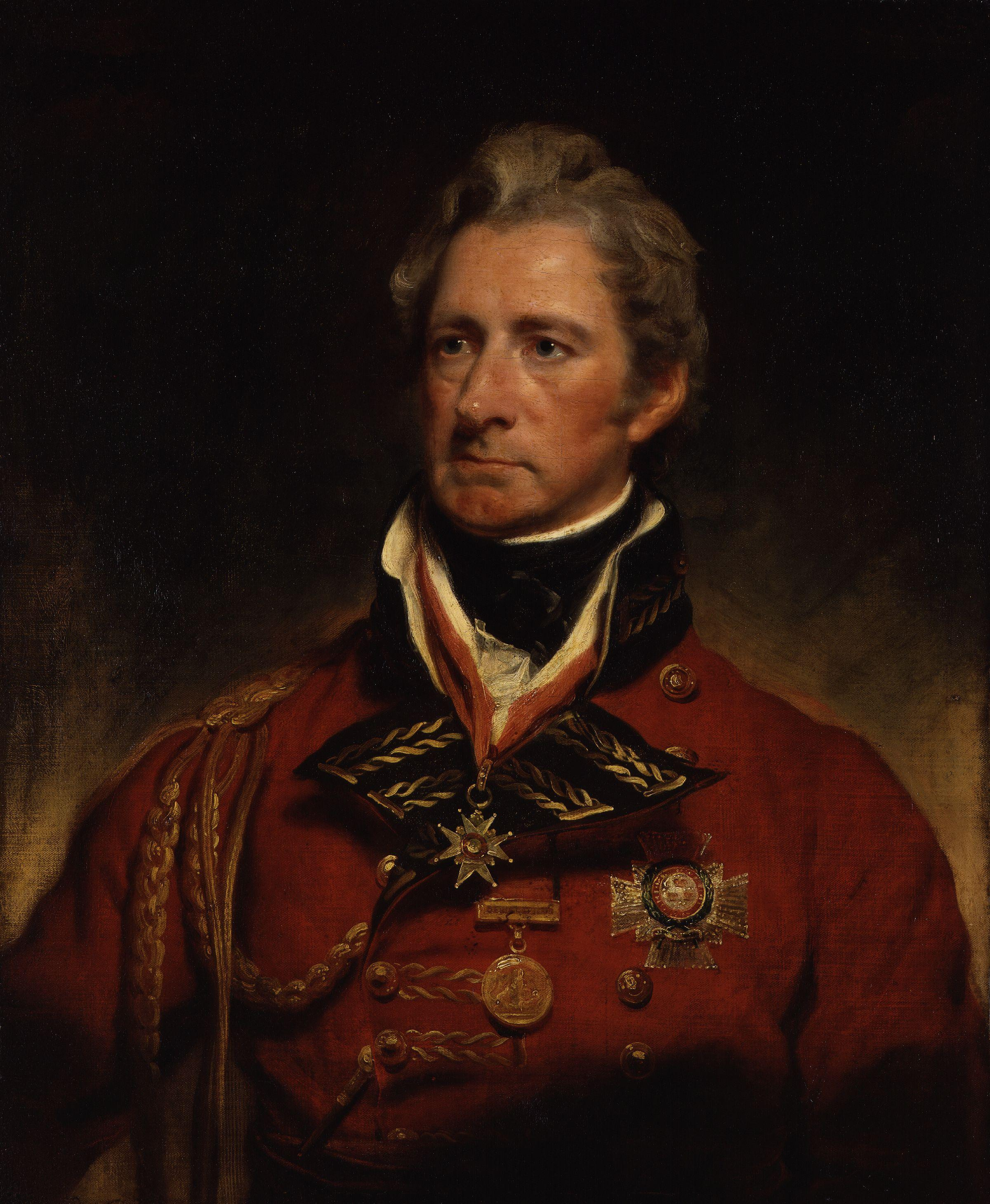
- Portrait by Martin Archer Shee, 1819

Governor of Madras
- In office 10 June 1820 – 10 July 1827
- Governors-General: The Marquess of Hastings; The Earl Amhurst
- Preceded by: Hugh Elliot
- Succeeded by: Stephen Rumbold Lushington

Personal details
- Born: 27 May 1761 Glasgow, Scotland
- Died: 6 July 1827 (aged 65) Pattikonda, Madras Presidency
- Education: University of Glasgow
- Awards: Knight Commander of the Order of the Bath

Military service
- Allegiance: East India Company
- Branch/service: Madras Army
- Years of service: 1779–1827
- Rank: Major-general
- Battles/wars: Second Anglo-Mysore War; Third Anglo-Mysore War; Third Anglo-Maratha War

Major-General Sir Thomas Munro, 1st Baronet KCB (27 May 1761 – 6 July 1827) was a Madras Army officer and colonial administrator who served as the governor of Madras from 1820 to 1827.

== Background ==
Munro was born in Glasgow on 27 May 1761 to the Glaswegian merchant Alexander Munro. Thomas' grandfather was a tailor, who prospered by successful investments in American tobacco. After working as a bank clerk, Alexander Munro joined the family's prosperous tobacco business, but was ruined by the collapse of the tobacco trade during the American Revolutionary War. Thomas was also claimed to be a direct descendant of George Munro, 10th Baron of Foulis (died 1452), chief of the Highland Clan Munro, but clan historian R. W. Munro has contested this claim.

Thomas was educated at the University of Glasgow. While at school, Thomas was distinguished for a singular openness of temper, a mild and generous disposition, with great personal courage and presence of mind. Being naturally of a robust frame of body, he surpassed all his school-fellows in athletic exercises, and was particularly eminent as a boxer. He was at first intended to enter his father's business, but in 1779 was appointed to an infantry cadet ship in Madras.

== Military career ==
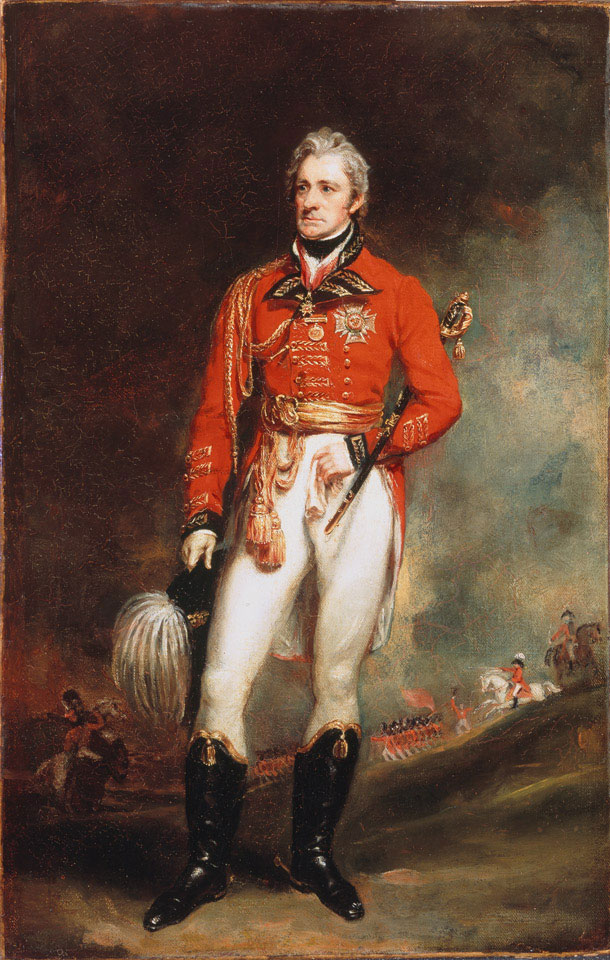
1819 portrait of Munro by Martin Archer Shee

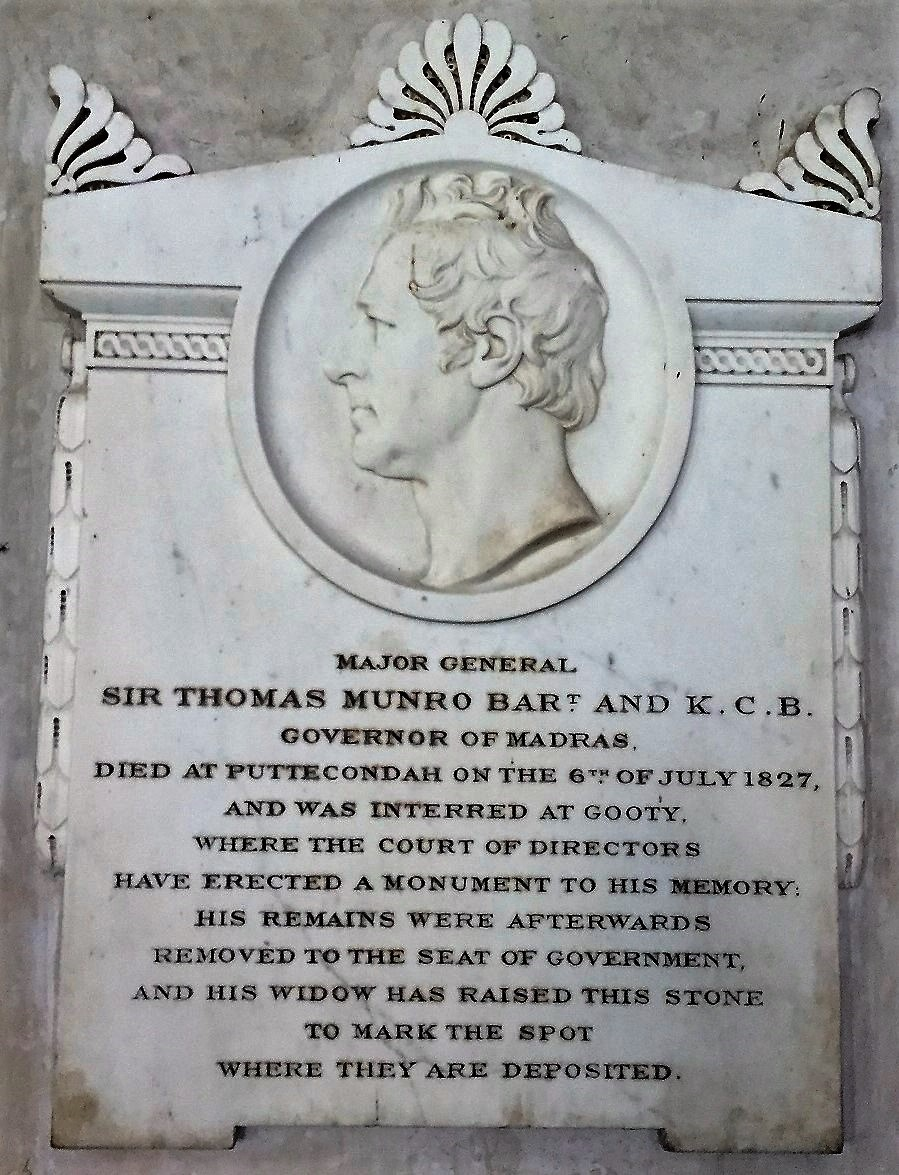
Memorial to Munro in St. Mary's Church, Madras

He served with his regiment during the hard-fought war against Hyder Ali (1780–1783), under his namesake Major Sir Hector Munro, 8th of Novar. Thomas also later served alongside another namesake John Munro, 9th of Teaninich. Thomas served again with his regiment in the first campaign against Tipu Sultan (1790–1792). He was then chosen as one of four military officers to administer part of the territory captured from Tipu, where he remained for seven years learning the principles of revenue survey and assessment which he afterwards applied throughout the presidency of Madras. After the final downfall of Tipu in 1799, he spent a short time restoring order in Kanara; and then for another seven years (1800–1807) he was placed in charge of the Ceded Districts ceded by the Nizam of Hyderabad, where he introduced the ryotwari system of land revenue. After a long furlough in Britain, during which he gave valuable evidence upon matters connected with the renewal of the East India Company's charter, he returned to Madras in 1814 with special instructions to reform the judicial and police systems. In response to a question put to him in 1813, concerning the renewal of the charter, he stated:

I do not exactly know what is meant by civilizing the people of India. In the theory and practice of good government they may be deficient; but if a good system of agriculture, if unrivalled manufactures—if a capacity to produce what luxury or convenience demands—if the establishment of schools for reading and writing—if the general practice of kindness and hospitality—and, above all, if a scrupulous respect and delicacy towards the female sex, are amongst the points that denote civilized people, then the Hindoos are not inferior in civilization to the people of Europe.

He was affectionately called 'mandrolayya' by local Telugu people after he brokered peace between local Polygars.

On the outbreak of the Pindari War in 1817, he was appointed as brigadier-general to command the reserve division formed to reduce the southern territories of the Peshwa. Of his services on this occasion Lord Canning said in the House of Commons:

He went into the field with not more than five or six hundred men, of whom a very small proportion were Europeans .... Nine forts were surrendered to him or taken by assault on his way; and at the end of a silent and scarcely observed progress he emerged... leaving everything secure and tranquil behind him.

In 1819, Munro was appointed a Knight Commander of the Order of the Bath (KCB).

== Governor of Madras ==
In 1820, he was appointed governor of Madras, where he founded systems of revenue assessment and general administration which substantially persisted into the twentieth century. He is regarded as the father of the 'Ryotwari system'. His official minutes, published by Sir A. Arbuthnot, form a manual of experience and advice for the modern civilian. Munro was created a baronet in 1825. He died of cholera on 6 July 1827 while on tour in the ceded districts, where his name is preserved by more than one memorial. An equestrian statue of him, by Francis Legatt Chantrey, stands in Madras city.At his behest a Committee of public instruction was formed in 1826, which eventually led to the formation of Presidency College.

== Incidents at Mantralayam (Andhra Pradesh) ==
The village of Mantralayam in Andhra Pradesh is the location of the tomb of the Dvaita saint Raghavendra Swami. A narrative regarding Thomas Munro and this site, drawn from prevailing local legend, was recorded by W. Francis in the Madras Government Gazette, Chapter XI, page 213, more than a century after the events it describes. This order is reported to be preserved at Fort St. George as well as at Mantralayam. No direct documentation by Munro himself of the incident is available.

The legend holds that when Sir Thomas Munro was serving as Collector of Bellary in 1800, the Madras Government directed him to collect the annual tax from the Mantralaya Matha and the village of Mantralayam. When revenue officials were unable to carry out this order, Munro visited the Matha in person to investigate the matter. Upon arriving at the sacred precincts housing the original tomb, he removed his hat and shoes before entering. According to the account, Sri Raghavendra Swami emerged from the tomb and conversed with Munro for a period of time regarding the resumption of the endowment. The saint was said to have been visible and audible to Munro alone, who received Mantrakshata, a form of divine blessing. Munro subsequently returned and issued an order in favour of both the Math and the village.

== Statue ==
Sculpted by Francis Chantrey, and sitting straight on his horse, in the middle of Chennai's famed Island, is The Stirrupless Majesty. Chantrey's Equestrian statues of King George IV and Wellington in London are similarly bareback and stirrupless.

== See also ==
- Munro Baronets

== Notes ==
Political offices
Preceded by Hugh Elliot	Governor of Madras; 1820–1827	Succeeded by Henry Sullivan Graeme (acting)
Baronetage of the United Kingdom
New creation	Baronet (of Lindertis); 1825–1827	Succeeded by Thomas Munro
