= Dastak (trade permit) =

Colonial Era trade permit issued by Indian kings

Dastak was a trade permit mostly issued to European traders by officials of the East India Company. The trade permit waived customs or transicharges for personal goods. The power to issue trade permits was conferred upon Company officials by the Mughal Emperor Farrukhsiyar after William Hamilton, a surgeon associated with the Company cured him of a disease.

== Definition ==
The practice of using dastaks for almost any goods was consolidated by Robert Clive when he overthrew the then Nawab of Bengal, Mir Quasim after he opposed the British East India Company's position that their dastaks meant that they could trade without paying taxes (other local merchants with dastaks were required to pay up to 40% of their revenue as tax). The British then seized control of the province of Bengal by reinstating puppet ruler Mir Jafar.

== Advantages ==
The dastak was an important reason for the impoverishment of Bengal. Company officials were able to make personal fortunes by using the dastaks which allowed them to skip paying custom duties altogether. This led to a drain in wealth from Bengal. The practice of abusing trade laws was institutionalized such that any gain made by the Indian products in foreign markets translated into a financial gain for Britain.

== Abolishment ==
The practise of issuing dastaks to traders was abolished by Warren Hastings due to the disadvantage the dastaks offered to the local Indian traders.
