= Mary Bird (author) =

British missionary and author

Mary Bird (29 May 1789 – 29 May 1834) was a British missionary and author of English and Hindustani educational books for children. She moved to India in 1823 to join her brother, Robert Merttins Bird, at Gorakhpur. There, she learnt Hindustani and helped in the mission before transferring to Calcutta where she opened Bible classes in zenanas.
