= Nazr =

Urdu word

In Islam, the word nazr (Arabic: نذر) or "Hasad" is a vow or commitment to carry out an act. The failure to fulfill the commitment results in the need to take a compensating action, often of a charitable nature, such as feeding the poor. Nazr can also take the form of tribute to a superior or the payment of a fee when taking office. The concept is ancient and recurs throughout the history of the Islamic world. For instance in 1632, Mirza Zulqarnain, a Christian official in the Mughul Empire, paid nazr of five elephants to the Mughal Court.
