= Ryotwari =

Land revenue system in British India

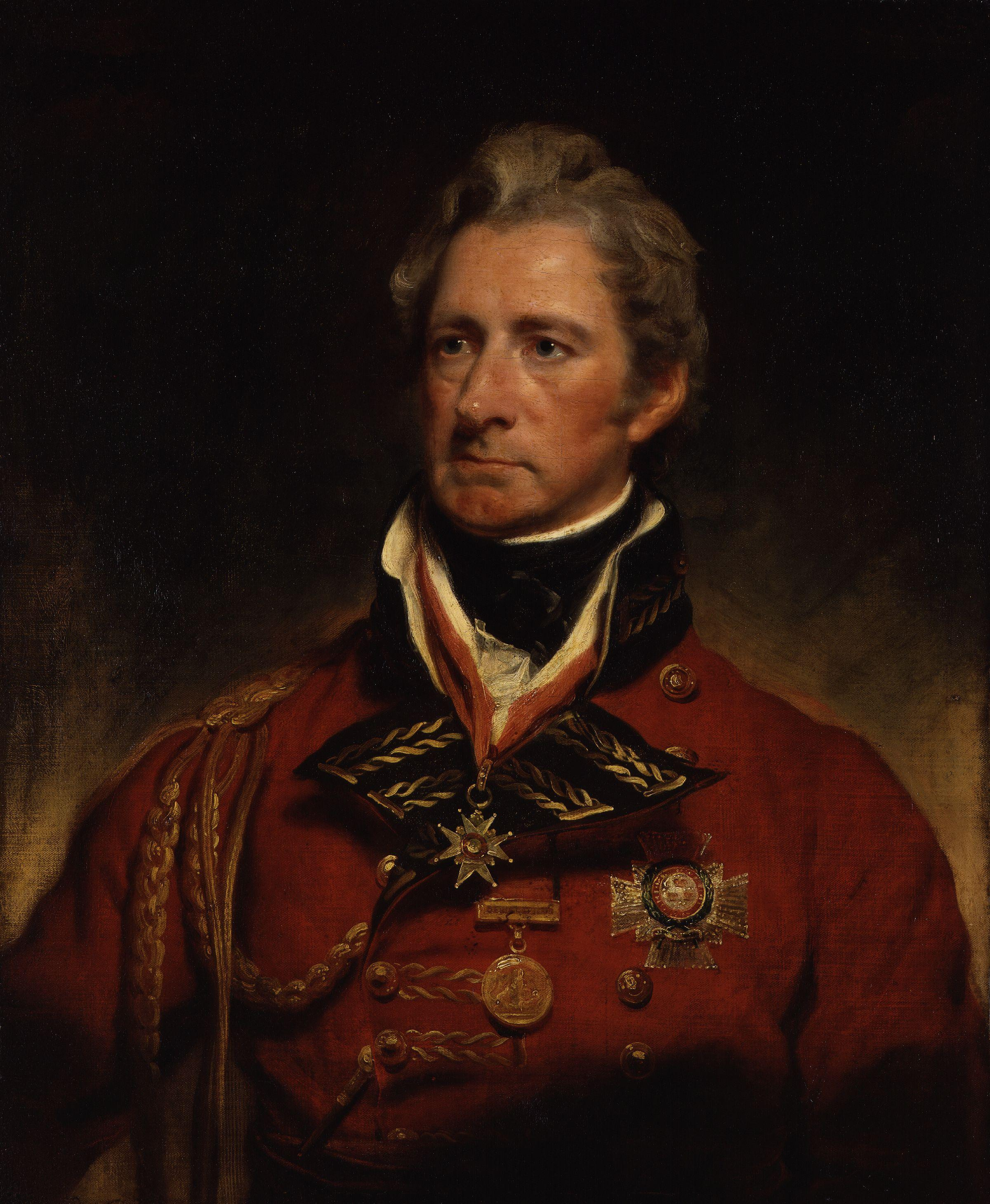
Sir Thomas Munro, who introduced the system

The ryotwari system was a land revenue system implemented in British India by Sir Thomas Munro, 1st Baronet which allowed the colonial government to deal directly with farmers regarding revenue collection and gave them the freedom to cede or acquire new land for cultivation.

== Description ==
This system was in operation for nearly 50 years and had many features of revenue system of the Mughals. It was instituted in some parts of India, one of the three main systems used to collect revenues from the cultivators of agricultural land. These taxes included undifferentiated land revenue and rents, collected simultaneously. Where the land revenue was imposed directly on the ryots (the individual cultivators who actually worked the land) the system of assessment was known as ryotwari. Where the land revenue was imposed indirectly through agreements made with Zamindars the system of assessment was known as zamindari. In Bombay Presidency, Madras Presidency, Assam Province and British Burma the Zamindar usually did not have a position as a middleman between the government and the farmer.

An official report by John Stuart Mill, who was working for the East India Company in 1857, explained the Ryotwari land tenure system as follows:

Under the Ryotwari System every registered holder of land is recognised as its proprietor, and pays direct to Government. He is at liberty to sublet his property, or to transfer it by gift, sale, or mortgage. He cannot be ejected by Government so long as he pays the fixed assessment, and has the option annually of increasing or diminishing his holding, or of entirely abandoning it. In unfavourable seasons remissions of assessment are granted for entire or partial loss of produce. The assessment is fixed in money, and does not vary from year to year, in those cases where water is drawn from a Government source of irrigation to convert dry land into wet, or into two-crop land, when an extra rent is paid to Government for the water so appropriated; nor is any addition made to the assessment for improvements effected at the Ryot's own expense. The Ryot under this system is virtually a Proprietor on a simple and perfect title, and has all the benefits of a perpetual lease without its responsibilities, in as much as he can at any time throw up his lands, but cannot be ejected so long as he pays his dues; he receives assistance in difficult seasons, and is irresponsible for the payment of his neighbours... The Annual Settlements under Ryotwari are often misunderstood, and it is necessary to explain that they are rendered necessary by the right accorded to the Ryot of dimi Rapeg or extending his cultivation from year to year. Their object is to determine how much of the assessment due on his holding the Ryot shall pay, and not to reassess the land. In these cases where no change occurs in the Ryots holding a fresh Patta or lease is not issued, and such parties are in no way affected by the Annual Settlement, which they are not required to attend.

This took place in the Madras presidency and later extended to Bombay presidency

== History ==
The Ryotwari system is associated with the name of Thomas Munro, who was appointed Governor of Madras Presidency in May 1820. Subsequently, the Ryotwari system was extended to the Bombay Presidency area. Munro gradually reduced the rate of taxation from one half to one third of the gross produce, even then an excessive tax.

In Northern India, Edward Colebrooke and successive Governors-General had implored the Court of Directors of the East India Company, in vain, to redeem the pledge given by the British government, and to permanently settle the land-tax, so as to make it possible for the people to accumulate wealth and improve their own condition.

Payment of the land tax in cash, rather than in kind, was instituted in the late 18th century when the East India Company wanted to establish an exclusive monopoly in the market as buyers of Indian goods. The requirement of cash payments frequently proved economically untenable for cultivators, exposing them to the exorbitant demands of moneylenders when crops failed.

== In Bengal and Northern India the zamindari system was as follows ==
- To collect tax from a land, the British had zamindars bid for the highest tax rates; i.e., zamindars quoted a tax rate that they promised to obtain from a particular land.
- The highest bidder was made the owner of the land from which they collected the taxes.
- The farmers and cultivators who owned the land lost their ownership and became tenants in their own land.
- They were to pay the landlords/zamindars the tax for the land only in the form of cash and not in kind.
- If a zamindar was not able to collect the quoted amount of tax, he lost the ownership.

== By comparison, this is the way taxes had been collected by the king ==
- The tax could be paid either in cash or in kind.
- Payments in kind were mostly in the form of land which was given to the king.
- The king never made use of those lands, which could be bought back by the farmers after they got back some money.
- The farmer owned his land.
- Tax rates were reduced in case of a famine, bad weather or other serious event.

== The Salient Aspects of the Ryotwari System & its Impact ==
1. Since the farmer had to pay only in cash under the new system, he could only sell it to a fellow farmer who started using the land for cultivation of a different crop and therefore was not willing to return it.
2. The farmer eventually lost some part of his land to someone else and consequently retained a highly awkward remnant of land for cultivation.
3. This led to excessive marketing of land, which lost its sentimental grip on the farmer. The land became merely a commodity.
4. If the ryot was unable to pay the taxes (which were steep, at times) the land could be taken over by the Government or Administrator & handed over to someone else. It made the Ryots not owners of the land but leasee (effectively slaves) under the administration.
5. As far as the agrarian reform goes, it led to land fragmentation as well as attempts at getting newer & more area under cultivation & taxation

Also because of the political scheme of Subsidiary Alliances, the pressure on agricultural land made things worse. It led to a failure of administration, leaving the blame on the feudatory king of the province; which allowed the East India Company to easily take over the administration.

== See also ==
- Land tenure

== Bibliography ==
- Banerjee, Abhijit; Iyer, Lakshmi (September 2005), "History, Institutions, and Economic Performance: The Legacy of Colonial Land TenureSystems in India", The American Economic Review, 95 (4): 1190–1213, doi:10.1257/0002828054825574, hdl:1721.1/63662, JSTOR 4132711
- Dutt, R. C. (1902), The Economic History of India Under Early British Rule. Vol. I: From the Rise of the British Power in 1757 to the Accession of Queen Victoria in 1837 (PDF), London: Kegan Paul
  - Dutt, R. C. (2001), The Economic History of India Under Early British Rule. From the Rise of the British Power in 1757 to the Accession of Queen Victoria in 1837, Routledge, ISBN 0-415-24493-5
- Dutt, R. C. (1904), The Economic History of India in the Victorian Age. Vol. II: From the Accession of Queen Victoria in 1837 to the Commencement of the Twentieth Century (PDF), London: Kegan Paul
  - Dutt, R. C. (2000), The Economic History of India in the Victorian Age. Vol. II: From the Accession of Queen Victoria in 1837 to the Commencement of the Twentieth Century, London: Routledge, ISBN 81-85418-01-2
- Harnetty, Peter (Autumn 1966), "The British Impact on India: Some Recent Interpretations: A Review Article", Pacific Affairs, 39 (3/4): 361–375, doi:10.2307/2754279, JSTOR 2754279
