= Barha family =

Indian noble family

Barha
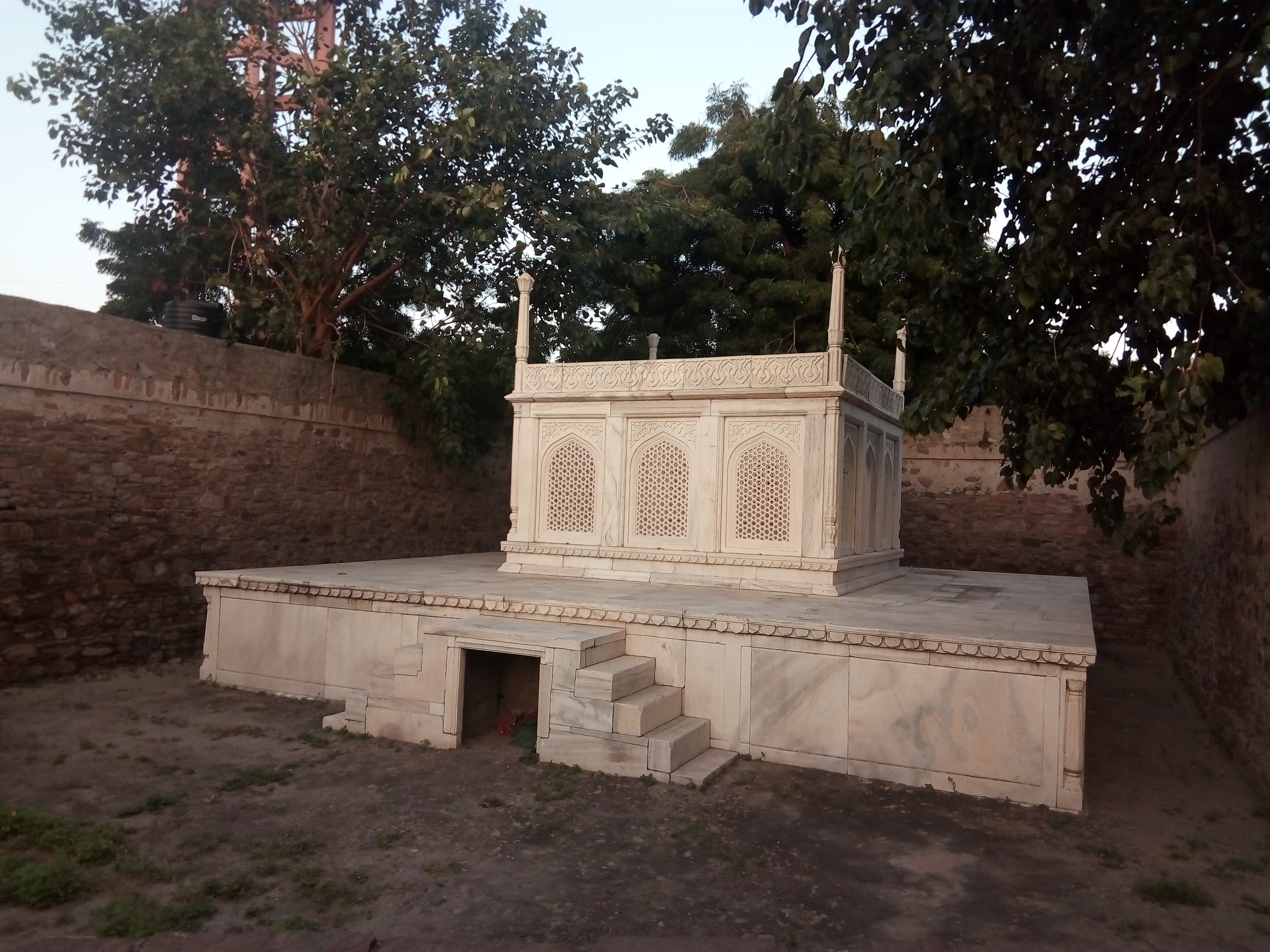
- Tomb of Abdullah Khan Barha in Ajmer
- Current region: South Asia
- Founded: 13th Century
- Founder: Abul Farah al-Wasiti
- Titles: Subahdar of Bijapur; Nawab of Ajmer; Nawab of Aurangabad; Nawab of Allahabad; Nawab of Sambalhera; Faujdar of Hisar
- Members: Abdullah Khan Barha; Hussain Ali Khan Barha; Hassan Ali Khan Barha; Sayyed Mahmud Khan; Saif Khan Barha; Qasim Khan Barha; Hashim Khan Barha; Sayyid Ahmed Khan Barha
- Cadet branches: Tihaanpuri branch Chatrauri branch Jagneri branch Kudliwal branch

The Barha family (also known as Bahera or Bara) was an Indian Shi'a Muslim noble family during the period of Delhi Sultanate and the Mughal Empire.

The family traditionally held military ranks and frequently led armies in the service of Mughal emperors from the time of emperor Akbar (1542–1605) into the early 18th century. Under the Sayyid brothers, Hussain Ali Khan and Hassan Ali Khan, the Barhas became the de facto ruling family of the Mughal court from 1713 to 1720.

== Background ==
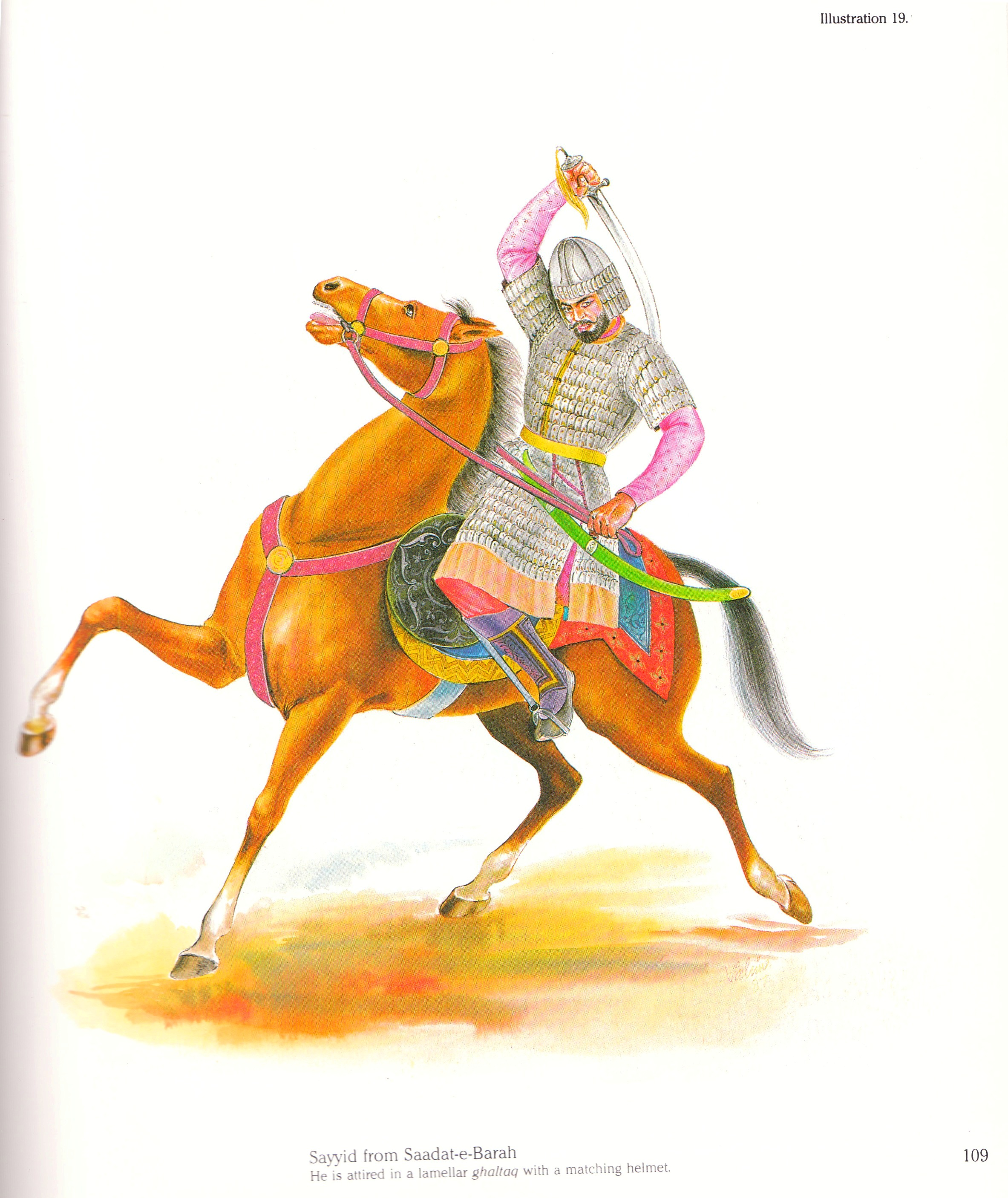
A cavalryman of the Bara family

According to the consensus of all family tradition, the dynasty's ancestor was Abdullah Abul Farah Wasiti Hussaini of Wasit , Iraq , A 15th generation descendant of Zaid ibn Ali , who migrated to Punjab during the reign of Mahmud of Ghazni .

Abul Farah Wasti had twelve sons. Upon his return to Ghazni from Punjab, he left four of his sons behind: Daood, Abul Fazl, Abul Araash, and Najmuddin. Subsequently, these sons established the four primary branches of the family: Kundliwal, Chathrodi, Jajneri, and Tihaanpuri.

From the Turani factions of the Mughal court, a persistent allegation cast doubt on the Sayyid lineage of the Barha dynasty. This skepticism was further fueled by the dynasty's secular and indianised cultural practices. This narrative was widely popularized by Khafi Khan in his historical work, Muntakhab al-Lubaab. Citing these accounts, Western historian Dirk H. A. Kolff argued that the ancestors of the Barha were of marginal peasant origins and moved at an uncertain date from their homeland in Punjab to a barren region in the Muzaffarnagar district of Uttar Pradesh. Similarly, American historian Richard M. Eaton noted that their clan was as native to India as were the Jats, Rajputs, or Marathas.

However, not much substantial evidence has been presented to support such a sweeping claim, beyond pointing out the Barha's distinct cultural and rustic style. Historian Satish Chandra offers an alternative explanation for the rustic and Indianized culture of the Barhas. Rather than attributing this to an inherently Indian origin, Chandra argues that their long-standing residence in India over several centuries, long before Mughals came to India—marked by local intermarriage and the establishment of numerous settlements, led Barhas to gradually adopt Indian customs and manners. According to historian him, the Saiyids of Barha migrated to India from Arabia during the Delhi Sultanate period and settled in northern India. Nevertheless, the Turani factions weaponised this cultural shift to counter the political rise of the Barha nobility , and it remained a matter of intense debate.

Furthermore, external historical documentation outside of the Mughal court rivalries—such as the accounts compiled by Iraqi historian Muhammad Said al-Tarihi in his work Tarikh al-Shia fi al-Hind and the comprehensive genealogical treatise Mudrik al-Talib fi Nasab Al Abi Talib by Al-Syed Qamar Abbas Al-Hamadani, a heavyweight in Islamic Genealogy—records the family unconditionally as Sayyids, completely omitting the factional court disputes. The same Barha Sayyid lineage, categorized under the title Al al-Farah al-Wasiti, is also recorded in Al-Mushajjar al-Wafi, a multi-volume reference work on Hashemite genealogy authored by the Najafi historian and genealogist Sayyid Hussein Abu Saida al-Musawi, who studied under senior Najaf jurists including Mirza Ali al-Gharawi, Murtada al-Borujerdi, and Grand Ayotullah Ali al-Sistani, and authored over thirty works on Islamic history and genealogy.

Mughal emperor Jahangir wrote in his autobiography, Jahangirnama, that while rival factions questioned their claim, their bravery is a proof of their sayyed descent.

Farruksiyar's daughter Malika-uz-Zamani, said the following words to Hussain Ali Khan Barha, regarding the latter's lineage to convince him to back her father's claim to throne. "It is true you are of the race of God's messenger, and you descend in a direct line from the holy Ali; moreover, you enjoy all the advantages which power and a high character can confer, but yet it cannot be denied that it is to Azim-ush-shan's favour that you owe your present station. If, then, you make use of this power in aid of my father, and render him those services which may be expected from your illustrious birth and your high character, you will prove yourself worthy of the distinctions of my grandfather Aurengzib. Whatever be our destiny, beware of what the world shall say of you"

Following the decline of the Barha Sayyids' political and military influence in the mid-18th century, several groups claimed descent from the clan. This trend accelerated significantly after the abolition of the zamindari system in India in the 1950s. Among the most prominent claimants were the ruling Nawabs of Rampur. In his early 20th-century historical work Akhbar-us-Sanadid, the scholar Maulvi Muhammad Najmul Ghani Khan Rampuri asserted that the founder of the Rampur dynasty, Nawab Ali Muhammad Khan Rohilla, was descended from the Chathrodi branch of the Barha Sayyids. Genealogy books of Sadat e Barha however did not include the Nawabs of Rampur in their entries.

Regardless of the ongoing debate , by the time of the emperor Aurangzeb in the 17th century, the dynasty was firmly regarded as "old nobility" and held subahs (provinces) such as Ajmer and the Deccan (Dakhin). In the late Mughal period they formed the Hindustani faction of Mughal nobility as opposed to the Turkic Turani and Persian Irani.

== Tihaanpuri branch ==
The Tihaanpuri branch began with Sayyid Jalal Khan Emir, an eighth-generation descendant of Abdullah al Wasiti, and produced several high-ranking nobles including Nawab Abdullah Khan I. Khan Emir left Tihanpur and settled in Dharsi in the pargana (administrative district) of Jauli. He had four sons of whom the eldest, Umar Shahid, settled in Jansath; the second, Chaman, in Chitaura; the third, Hassan, in Bihari; and the fourth, Ahmad, in Kawal, in the pargana of Jansath.

=== Umar Shahid ===
The Sayyid brothers played an important role during the decline of the Mughal Empire.

When Umar Shahid arrived in Jahsad he found the area was already occupied by Jat and Brahmin communities. However, the branch's influence grew so significantly during the late Mughal era that Jansath was administratively separated from the Jauli pargana.

Nawab Abdullah Khan I – better known as Sayyid Mian in places like Ajmer – also emerged from this branch of the Barha family, which benefitted under Aurangzeb's reign. By the time Aurangzeb died the branch had considerable influence, with Sayyid Mian's sons Nawab Hussain Ali Khan and Nawab Abdullah Khan II – also known as the Sayyid brothers – attached to the future emperor Bahadur Shah I. The two brothers were positioned such that when Bahadur Shah I ascended to the throne with their assistance he granted Nawab Hussain Ali Khan the government of Patna and Nawab Abdullah Khan II the government of Allahabad.

The family's influence increased during this period, though it later declined following the death of the Sayyid brothers. For in 1709 Sayyid Ahmad, Sayyid Khan, Sayyid Hussain Khan, and Sayyid Ghairat Khan participated in the suppression of a rebellion by Hindu princes along the Narmada River, fought in the vanguard, and were killed along with their followers. However, the Tihaanpuris still remained active in later campaigns in Punjab, Gujarat, and along the Indus River.

In 1712 the sons of Sayyid Mian found themselves in a dangerous position and, being distrustful of other ministers in Delhi, took it upon themselves to place Prince Furrukhsiyar on the throne as emperor. The sons of Sayyid Mian participated in the battles of Sarai Alam Chand (Allahabad) and Agra, with Sayyid Nurudin Ali Khan killed in action at Allahabad.

Nawab Sayyid Hassan Ali Khan was thereafter known as Abdullah Khan II and was appointed grand vizier with the title of Qutb al Mulk, while Nawab Sayyid Hussain Ali Khan was appointed commander-in-chief with the title of Amir ul Mammalik. With the demise of the Sayyid brothers, many other notable Sayyids fell, beginning with the assassination of Hussain Ali Khan and the later capture of Abdullah Khan II at the Battle of Hasanpur. The Tihaanpuri branch declined significantly after this, as many of its leaders were killed or captured in conflicts with rival nobles such as Muhammad Amin Khan and Qamar ud din Khan.

=== Chaman ===
The Chaman branch was descended from Sayyid Chaman, who settled in Chitura. This branch gained much influence during the reign of Shah Jahan when Sayyid Jalal became a high-ranking Mansabdar. He was given possession of Kharwa Jalalpur in the Sardhan pargana of Meerut. However, the branch fell into decline when Sayyid Shams, son of Sayyid Jalal, left imperial service. He had two sons, Sayyid Asghar Ali and Sayyid Asad Ali, with the former dying childless while the descendants of the latter remained in Chitura until the British era.

=== Hassan ===
Sayyid Hassan had six sons, many of whom rose in imperial service and later became Zamindars.

Sayyid Nasirudin, the sixth son of Sayyid Hassan, earned fame as Sayyid Khanjahan-i-Shahjahanil. He attained power under the emperor Shahjahan and was consequently granted forty villages in the parganas of Khatauli and Sarwat, along with several bighas of land in free revenue for perpetuity with the title of Abul Muzaffar. He began construction of a new town which was completed by his son and named Muzaffarnagar.

=== Ahmad ===
The descendants of Sayyid Ahmad, who had settled in Kawal, gained much acclaim during the reign of Aurangzeb, with Tatar Khan and Diwan Muhammad Yar Khan becoming distinguished in imperial service.

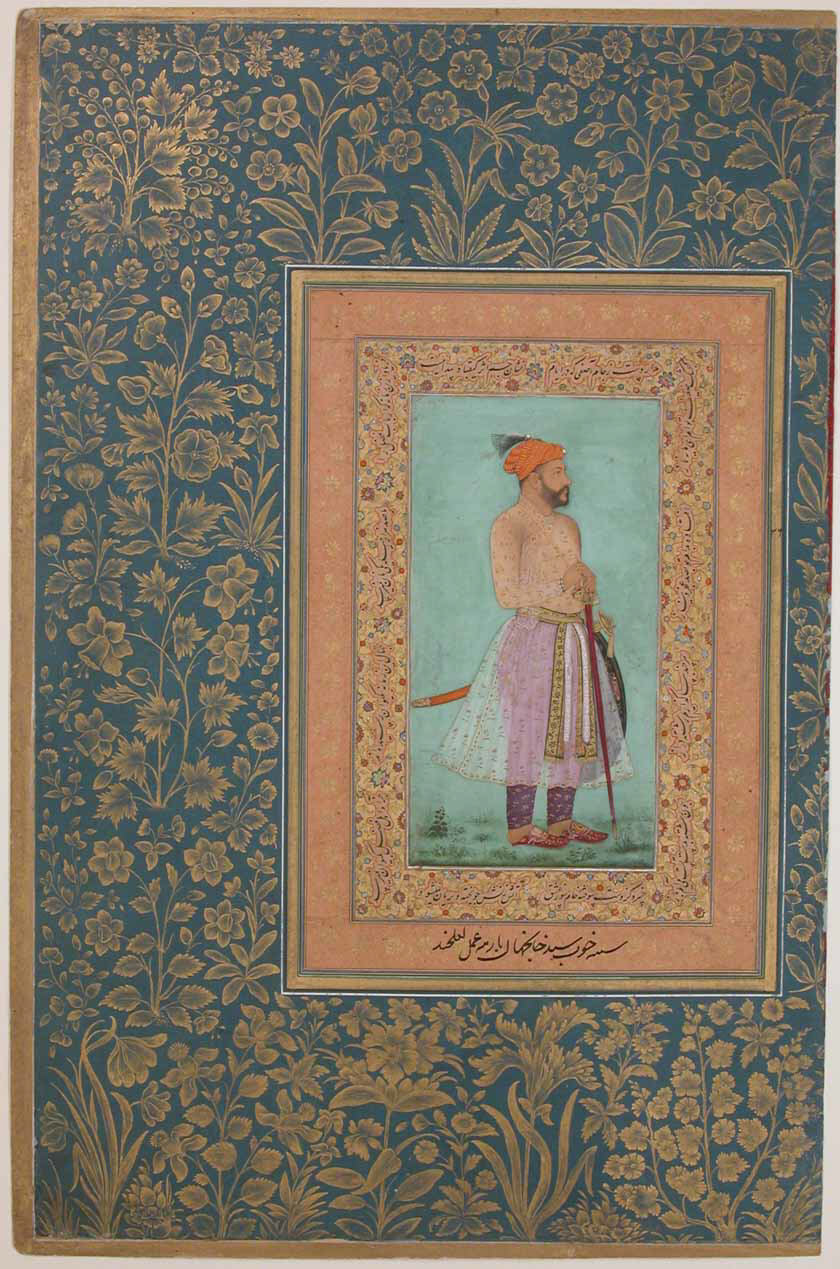
Portrait of Sayyid Abu'l Muzaffar Khan, Khan Jahan Barha.

== Chatrauri branch ==
The Chatrauri branch lived near Sambelhera and changed their name from Chatbanauri to Chatrauri. One member of this branch, Sayyid Hasan Fakhrudin, lived during the reign of Emperor Akbar and used his influence at court to help the Raja of Sambelhera confirm his dignity in the male line to his son, Ram Chand. When Ram Chand later died childless Sayyid Hasan helped Ram Chand's widow inherit the state. Pleased with the service rendered to her she passed on the entirety of her estate to him, and he was later confirmed in its possession as the Nawab of Sambelhera.

Sayyid Hasan had a child named Sayyid Hussain, who in turn had four children: Sayyid Sher Ali, who died without issue; Sayyid Ahmad, who was killed fighting Ratan Sen of Chitor and whose descendants settled in Kailawada while another fought under the emperor Muhammad Shah; Sayyid Tajudin, whose son Sayyid Umar founded Kakrauli and colonised the local towns of Rauli Nagla and Bera; and finally, Sayyid Salar Auliya, who obtained Kaithora from his grandfather. Sayyid Salar Auliya had two sons: Sayyid Haider Khan, whose descendant Sayyid Shahamat Khan settled in Miranpur and founded the Haider Khan family; and Sayyid Muhammad Khan, whose descendants remained in Kaithora and formed the Muhammad Khani family.

Of the Muhammad Khani family, Nusrat Yar Khan and Rukhan ad Daula became prominent during the reign of Muhammad Shah, gaining the governance of Agra, Gujarat, and Patna. They additionally held a jagir of 28 villages in Ahmedabad, which they gained in return for their service in annihilating their Tihaanpuri brethren, and which they retained until 1850. The Chatrauris of Morna received land grants to the west of Kali near Charthawal. A mosque built in 1725 for 1,900 rupees still stands in Morna in honor of the wife of Nawab Hasan Khan, the bakshi of Muhammad Shah.

== Jagneri branch ==
The Jagneri branch was descended from Sayyid Najmudin Hussain, who first settled in Bidauli. Several generations later his descendant Sayyid Fakhrudin moved to Palri in the Jauli pargana, where he purchased proprietary rights in Palri, Chanduri, Chandura, Tulsipur, and Khera. Members of this branch attained high positions during the reign of Akbar and subsequent emperors, but none achieved the prominence typical of other branches of the dynasty. The Jagneri branch was heavily affected by drought, leading to reduced economic prosperity. Nevertheless, the head of the family in Bidauli continued to serve as nazim to the Nawabs of Oudh while his nephew held the post of Chakladar.

== Kudliwal branch ==
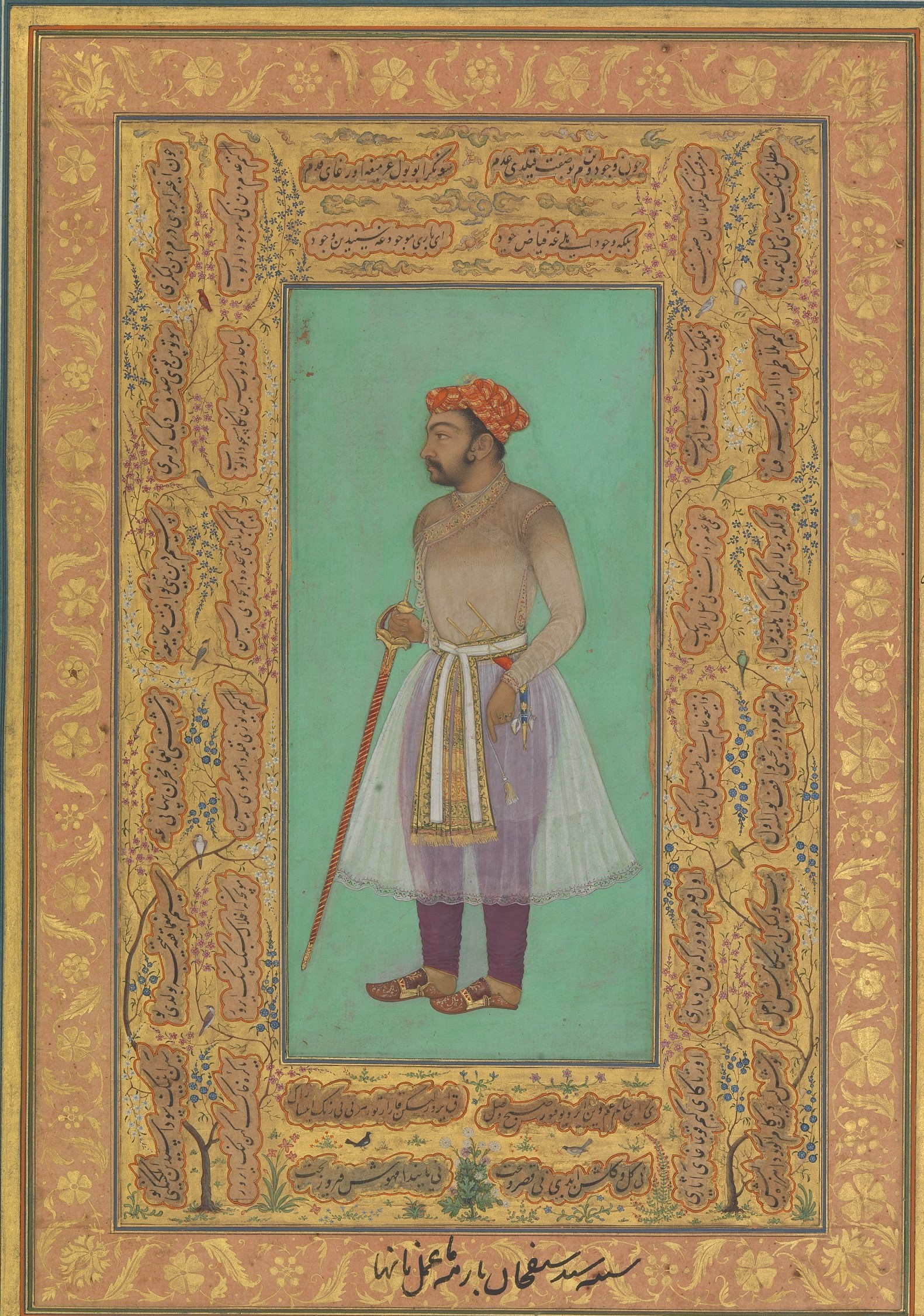
Saif Khan Barha, 1620

Members of the Kudliwal branch settled in Mujhera, where their family estates and a fort are recorded in district histories. Accounts compiled in the early 20th century identify Sayyed Mahmud Khan as an early figure of the Barha Sayyids in imperial service, with prior employment under the Sur rulers. He entered Mughal service during the siege of Mankot and subsequently served under Akbar in campaigns during the 1550s and early 1560s. He was granted a jagir near Delhi and is noted in regional histories for operations against local powers. He died in 1574 and was buried at Mujhera.

A local anecdote recorded in the district gazetteer relates that when challenged about his lineage Sayyid Mahmud is said to have declared, "If I am a Sayyid, the fire will not hurt me; if I am no Sayyid, I shall get burnt".

== Gallery ==
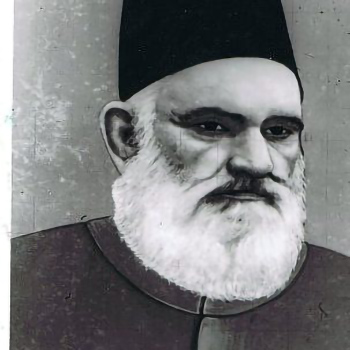
Mohsin-ul-Mulk was a Barha Syed of Etawah who converted to Sunni Islam.

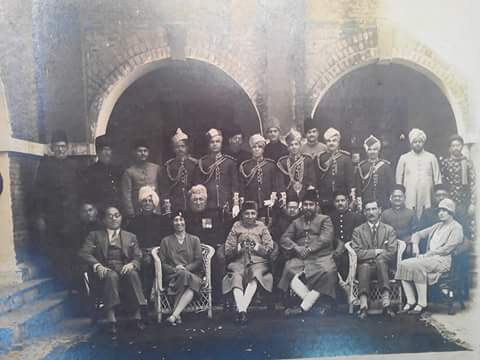
Khan Bahadur Barha of Jansath with Liaqat Ali Khan.

== See also ==
- Sayyid brothers
