= Zaidi (surname) =

The surname Al-Zaidi (Az-Zaidi) can denote one or both of the following:

- Sayyid Arab descendants of Zayd ibn Ali and/or Zaid Ibn Al-Hassan Bin Ali Ibn Abi Talib that either stayed in Kufa, Iraq or returned to Al-Hijaz.
- The use of the surname Al-Zaidi to designate association may be with the Zaidiyyah madhhab, whose adherents are found in Yemen. This is akin to the use of the surnames Al-Hanafi, Al-Maliki, Al-Shafi'i, etc.

People with the surname Zaidi trace their origins to Mecca, located in present-day Saudi Arabia. Zaid ibn Ali was the son of Ali ibn al-Husayn Zayn al-'Abidin who was the great-grandson of the Islamic prophet Muhammad thus the descendants of Zaid ibn Ali are known as Sayyid- an honorific title bestowed upon to the descendants of Muhammad. In Present times, the Descendants of Zaid ibn Ali can be found in Iraq, Iran, Afghanistan, India and Pakistan. The ones in India and Pakistan carry the surname Zaidi along with Wasti (denoting Zayd ibn Ali's descendants from Wasit) with Sadaat-e-Bara and Sadaat-e-Bilgram as prominent communities, they are followers of Twelver Shi'ism not Zaydism which is largely restricted to Yemen.

== The Wasitis/Zaidis in South Asia ==
The Zaidis of the Indian subcontinent use the proper noun "Wasiti" as a form of self-identification. Zayd ibn Ali is believed to have succumbed to injuries he sustain during a battle in Kufa, Iraq; many of his descendants either returned to al-Hijaz or remained in Iraq. Some of those who stayed in Iraq settled in Wasit. Some descendants from Wasit then moved to the Indian subcontinent. Most of the Zaidis migrated after the Mongol Siege of Baghdad in 1258. Most of them are settled in Iraq, Iran, Afghanistan, India and Pakistan.

The largest group among those identifying themselves as Zaidi is Saadat-e-Bara. Saadat means descendant of Muhammad and Bara means twelve in Urdu. There are many interpretations of word bara and many spellings are current: Bara, Bahera, Barha (as spelled in Tuzuk-e-Jahangiri, Akbarnama and other Moghul sources) and Bahira meaning "bright" in Arabic language. One explanation of the word is as mentioned above; another is that there are twelve villages in Muzaffarnagar district and their residents were called Sadat Barha.

Aurangzeb wrote about the Syeds of Barha:

"You should be extremely cautious in dealing with the Syeds of Barha...because a strong partner in government would soon seize the kingship for himself."

The Barha Sayyids in Muzaffarnagar rose as the de facto rulers of the Mughal empire, under their leaders Qutb-ul-Mulk and Ihtimam-ul-Mulk who deposed the Emperors Jahandar Shah, Farrukhsiyar, Rafi ud-Darajat and Shah Jahan II.

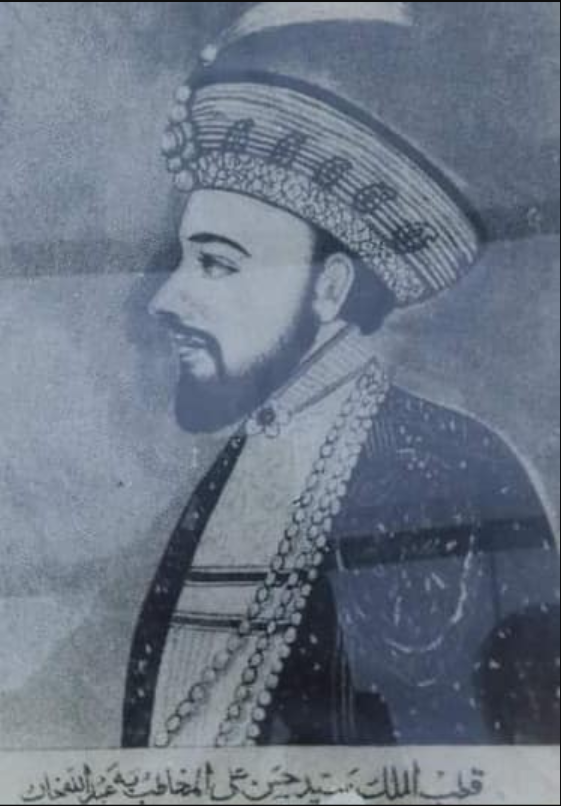
Qutb-ul-Mulk Hassan Ali Khan Barha

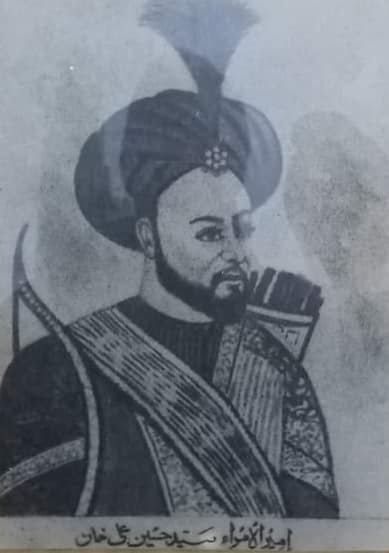
Amir-ul-Umara Hussain Ali Khan Barha

These Sayyeds are descendants of Sayyid Abu'l Farah Al Hussaini Al Wasti who came to India from Wasit (Iraq) in the 11th century along with his four sons who settled in four villages of Punjab, Kundliwaal, Chhatbanur, Tihanpur and Jajner giving names to all four clans of Sadat Barha. Their numbers are highest in Karachi (Pakistan) and Muzaffarnagar (India). The Kundliwal clan mainly live in Mujhera, Galibpur, Hashimpur, and Sikrehra Khola. The Chhatraudi clan mainly live in Sambalhera. Many of them migrated to Pakistan during the partition of India.

== Notable people with the surname Al-Zaidi ==
- Ali al-Zaidi (born 1986), became the prime minister of Iraq in 2026
- Muntadhar al-Zaidi (born 1979), Iraqi broadcast journalist who serves as a correspondent for Iraqi-owned, Egyptian-based Al-Baghdadia TV

== Notable people with the surname Zaidi ==
Art and literature

- Ali Jawad Zaidi, Urdu poet and writer of India
- Ali Naqi Zaidi (Safi Lakhnavi), Urdu poet of India
- Annie Zaidi, India English-language writer
- Askari Mian Zaidi (Askari Mian Irani), Pakistani artist, professor at National College of Arts
- Mohsin Zaidi, Indian Urdu poet
- Mustafa Zaidi, Urdu poet of Pakistan
- Nusrat Zaidi, Pakistani Urdu poet
- Sajida Zaidi, Indian educationist, Urdu writer and poet
- Ustad Sibte Jaafar Zaidi, poet, professor and head of various institutions in Pakistan
- Zahida Zaidi, Indian writer and critic

Architecture

- Nayyar Ali Zaidi, Pakistani architect

Government

- Shabbar Zaidi, 26th Chairman of Federal Board of Revenue
- Ijlal Haider Zaidi, Pakistani civil servant
- Ali Haider Zaidi, Pakistani Politician, Federal Minister for Maritime Affairs
- Bashir Hussain Zaidi, member of the First Lok Sabha and Vice Chancellor of AMU
- Ibtihal Al-Zaidi, former Iraqi minister for Women
- Nasim Zaidi, Chief Election Commissioner of India
- Sibte Hasan Zaidi, Indian toxicologist, head of the Industrial Toxicology Research Center
- Syed Nasim Ahmad Zaidi, Chief Election Commissioner of India

Media

- Ashar Zaidi, Pakistani broadcast sports journalist
- Yumna Zaidi, Pakistani Actress
- Hasan Zaidi, Indian television actor
- Hussain Zaidi, Indian journalist and screenwriter
- Laila Zaidi, British actress
- Tanveer Zaidi, Indian actor, businessman and educationist
- Salman Zaidi, Indian television personality
- Shama Zaidi, Indian designer and filmmaker
- Zaigham Zaidi, Pakistani photographer

Religion

- Sibt-e-Jaafar Zaidi, Pakistani educator

Sport

- Ashar Zaidi, Pakistani first-class cricketer
- Ashish Zaidi, Indian cricketer
- Mehdi Hassan Zaidi (Syed Modi), Indian badminton singles champion
- Zulqarnain Zaidi, former Pakistani cricketer
- Farhan Zaidi, President of Baseball Operations for the San Francisco Giants

== See also ==
- Zaidiyah
- Sayyid
- Saadat-e-Bara
- Wasti, lists notable people with the surname Wasti
