= Jamal-ud-Din Barah =

Indian Muslim noble

Jamal-ud-Din Barah was an Indian Muslim noble in the early Mughal Empire in the court of Akbar. He belonged to the Sadaat-e-Bara. He was the son of Mahmud Khan Barah, and his relative Sayyid Shujaat Khan Barah was governor of Allahabad. Jamal-ud-Din Barah had a love affair with Siyah Yamin, a dancing girl of the Emperor Akbar. He then fled to the mountains and collected a force and gave himself up to looting the parganas of Gujarat and robbed its highways. He was finally captured by Sayyid Qasim and sent to Lahore, where he was executed by arrows.

== See also ==
- Sadaat-e-Bara
- Sayyid Brothers
- Akbar
- Barha dynasty
