= Mujhera =

Village in Uttar Pradesh, India

Mujhera is a village in the Jansath sub-division of Muzaffarnagar District in Uttar Pradesh. It is the seat of the Kundliwal branch of Sadaat-e-Bahra.

== History ==
Sayyid Abu'l Farah Al Hussaini Al Wasti, a descendant of Zayd ibn Ali, son of Ali ibn al-Husayn Zayn al-Abidin and grandson of Husayn ibn Ali, and great-grandson of Muhammad. who came to India from Wasit, Iraq. In the eleventh century his son Sayyed Dawood settled in Kundli, a village in the Punjab region. His descendant Sayyed Aiwaz and his sons migrated to Mujhera at the invitation of their clansmen, who were already residing in a nearby village, Sambalhera, circa the fourteenth century. An inscribed epitaph of a tomb in Sambalhera village proves Sadaat-e-Bara's presence in Sambalhera in the year 777 AH. The Kundliwal branch of this clan flourished in Mujhera village and gained prominence in Akbar jahangir and Shahjahan's time. Sayyed Mahmud khan KundliwalSayyed Umar Nur Khan Barha, their brothers, sons, and grandsons were all Mansabdar (Military officers) in Mogul court. Tombs of Mahmud Khan, Sayyed Umar Nur Khan Barha Sayyid Ahmad Barha, Sayyid Jhajju Barha are in this village, alongside a bawli.

Babbar Ali played an important role in the history of Mujhera Sadat. He was one of the founder of village, his Maqbara is located near the Mujhera Sadat bus stand.Tareek-e-aina, History of kondewaal khap, Volume-1, Author- Vijay Kumar IPS, DIG

Lutaf Ali was the successor of Babbar Ali. Lutaf Ali is the famous personality of Mujhera Sadat and his Maqbara is situated at the start of Mujhera Sadat at present bus stand of Mujhera Sadat and the dargah of Imam Hussain.
