= Sikrehra Khola =

Sikrehra Khola or Sikrehra is a village in the Jansath sub-division of Muzaffarnagar District in Uttar Pradesh, India. It is the seat of the Kundliwal branch of Sadaat-e-Barha.
