= Hashimpur =

- Village
- Location in Kanpur, Uttar Pradesh, India Hashimpur (India)
- Coordinates: 26.9134°N 80.0350°E
- Country: India
- State: Uttar Pradesh
- District: Kanpur Nagar

Population (2011 Census of India)
  - Total: 475

Languages
  - Official: Hindi
- Time zone: UTC+5:30 (IST)
- PIN: 209202
- Vehicle registration: UP-78

Hashimpur (Hindi: हासिमपुर) is a village in Gilawat Aminabad Gram panchayat and Bilhaur Tehsil, Kanpur Nagar district, Uttar Pradesh, India. Its village code is 149916. As per 2011 Census of India report the population of the village is 475 where 255 are men and 220 are women.
