= Sayyid brothers =

Nobles in the Mughal Empire

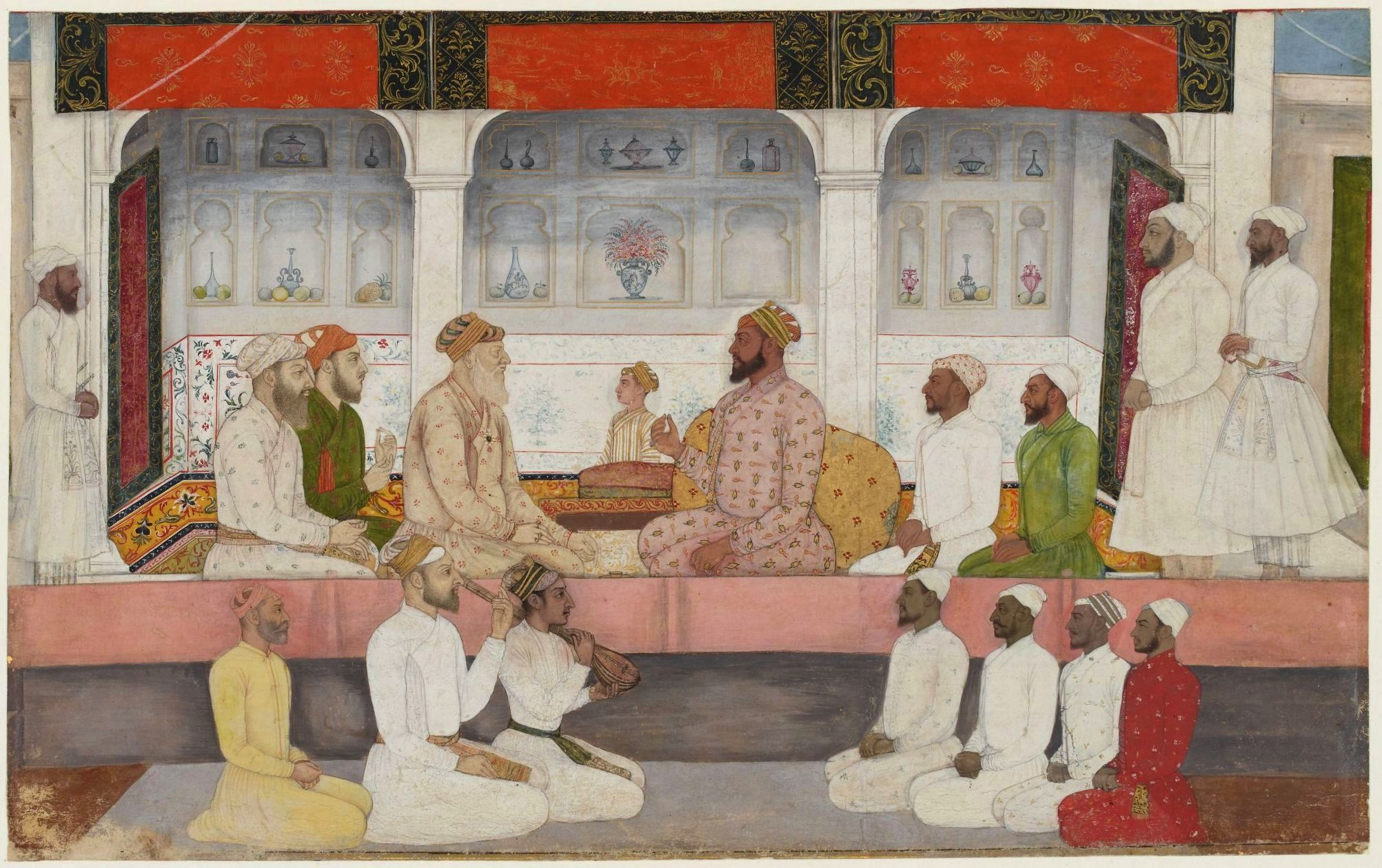
Syed Husain Ali Khan

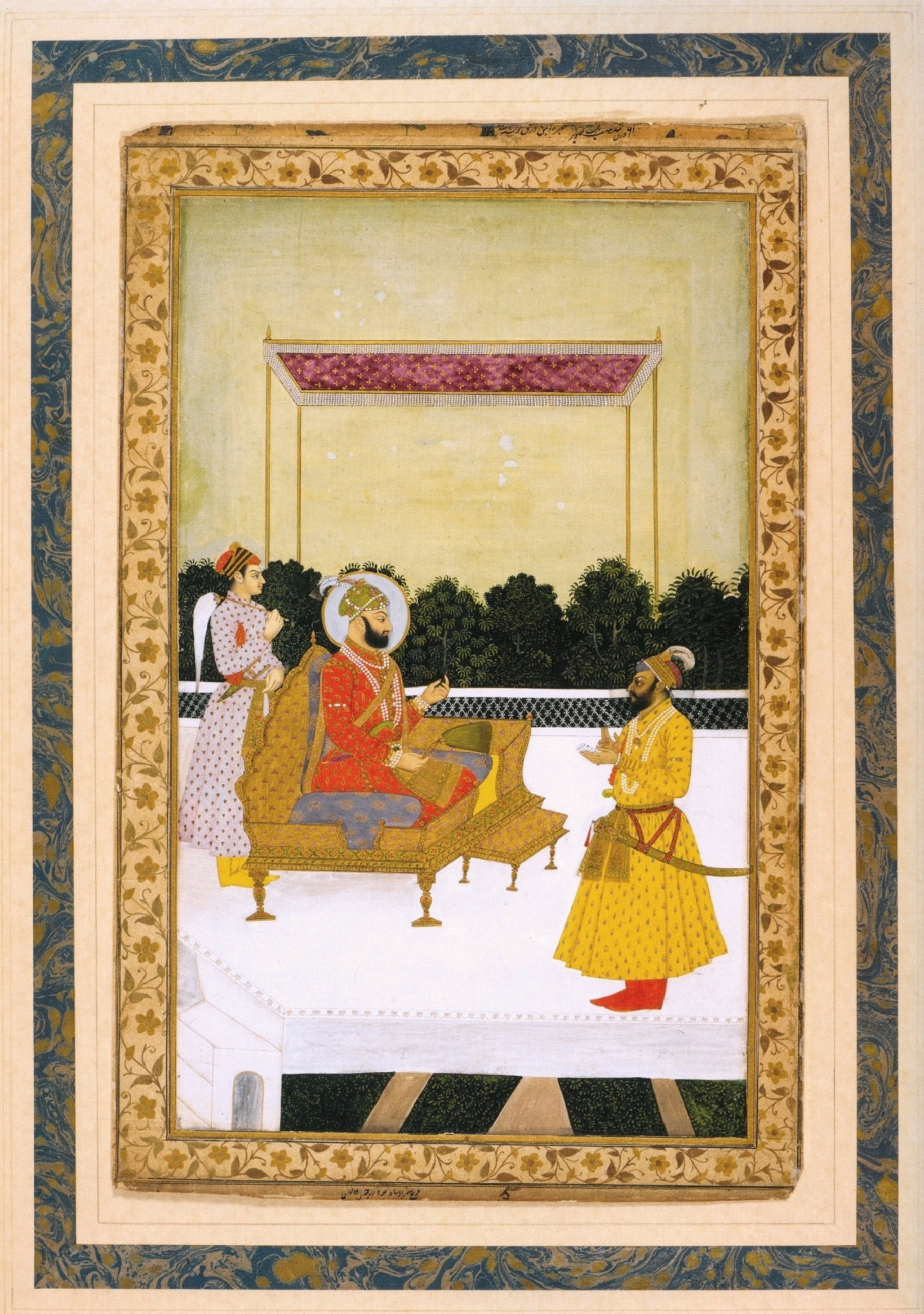
Syed Hassan Ali Khan

The Sayyid brothers were Abdullah Khan II and Syed Hussain Ali Khan, two powerful Mughal nobles who were active during the decline of the Mughal Empire.

Their sayyed ancestry has remained a point of debate. According to Contemporary scholars Dirk H.A. Kolff and Richard M. Eaton Barhas are as native to India as the Jats, Rajputs, and Marathas, and that the Barhas who migrated to Muzaffarnagar at an uncertain time, attributing their origins to India due to the non-Persian culture of the Barhas. However, rigorous Islamic genealogists such as the Qamar Abbas Araji al-Hamdani and Zafaryab Tirmizi al-Hussaini mentions their Zaidi Sayyid genealogy without much doubts in their respective books, Mudrik ut-Talib fi Ansaab-e-Aale Abi Talib and Tareekh-e-Anwaar-e-Sadaat.

The brothers became highly influential in the Mughal court after Aurangzeb's death in 1707 and became de facto sovereigns of the empire when they began to seat and unseat emperors. They restored Mughal authority to Ajmer in Rajasthan with the surrender of Maharaja Ajit Singh, and the Jat leader Churaman. During their rule, the Sikh rebel Banda Singh Bahadur was captured and executed. The Sayyids engaged in recruitment of soldiers, very few of whom were not Sayyids, or inhabitants of Barha, or non-Muslims.

Emperor Bahadur Shah I died in 1712, and his successor Jahandar Shah was assassinated on the orders of the Sayyid brothers. In 1713, Jahandar's nephew Farrukhsiyar (r. 1713–1719) became the emperor also with the help of the brothers. His reign marked the ascendancy of the brothers, who monopolised state power and reduced the emperor to a figurehead. The brothers conspired to send Nizam-ul-Mulk to the Deccan, away from the Mughal court to reduce his influence. In 1719, the brothers blinded, deposed and murdered Farrukhsiyar. They then arranged for his first cousin, Rafi ud-Darajat, to be the next ruler in February 1719. When Rafi ud-Darajat died of lung disease in June, they made his elder brother, Rafi ud-Daulah (Shah Jahan II), ruler. After the latter died of lung disease in September, Muhammad Shah (r. 1719–1748) ascended the throne at the age of 17 with the Sayyid brothers as regents until 1720.

To restore his de facto power, Muhammad Shah arranged for the brothers to be killed with the help of Nizam-ul-Mulk. Syed Hussain Ali Khan was murdered at Fatehpur Sikri in 1720, and Syed Hassan Ali Khan was fatally poisoned in 1722.

== Early appointments of the Syed brothers ==
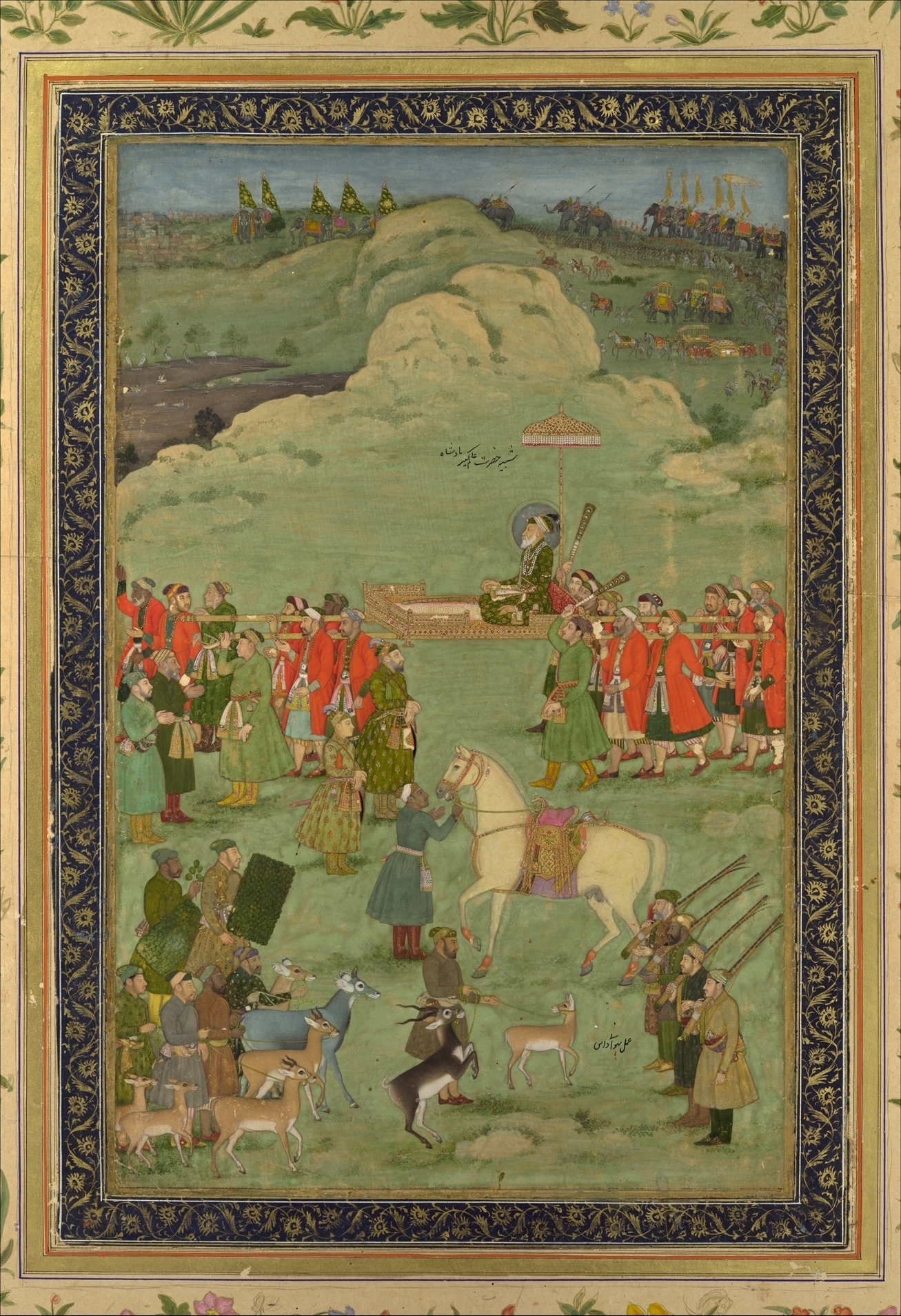
The Mughal Emperor Aurangzeb leads his final expedition (1705).

The two brothers, who now come into such prominence came from the old military aristocracy. Besides the prestige of the Syed lineage and the personal renown acquired by their own valor, they were the sons of Abdullah Khan Barha who was chosen by Aurangzeb as the first Subedar of Bijapur in the Deccan and then Subedar of Ajmer. Abdullah Khan had risen in the service of Ruhullah Khan, Aurangzeb's Mir Bakhshi (top government official), and finally, on receiving the rank of an imperial Mansabdar, attached himself to the eldest Prince Muazzam.

In 1697, Syed Hassan Ali Khan was Faujdar (military commander) of Sultanpur, Nazarbar in Baglana, and was appointed Subahdar (governor) of Khandesh in 1698 to halt Maratha expansion in the region. Later he was appointed ruler of Hoshangabad, Khandesh (Maharashtra). He was responsible for attacking Aurangabad during the final campaign against the Marathas in 1705 and attended the funeral of Aurangzeb in 1707.

Hassan's younger brother, Hussain Ali Khan, who is known to have greater energy than his elder brother, had during the reign of Aurangzeb held charge first of Ranthambore, in Ajmer, and then of Hindaun-Bayana, in Agra.

== Role in the Mughal war of succession (1707–1709) ==
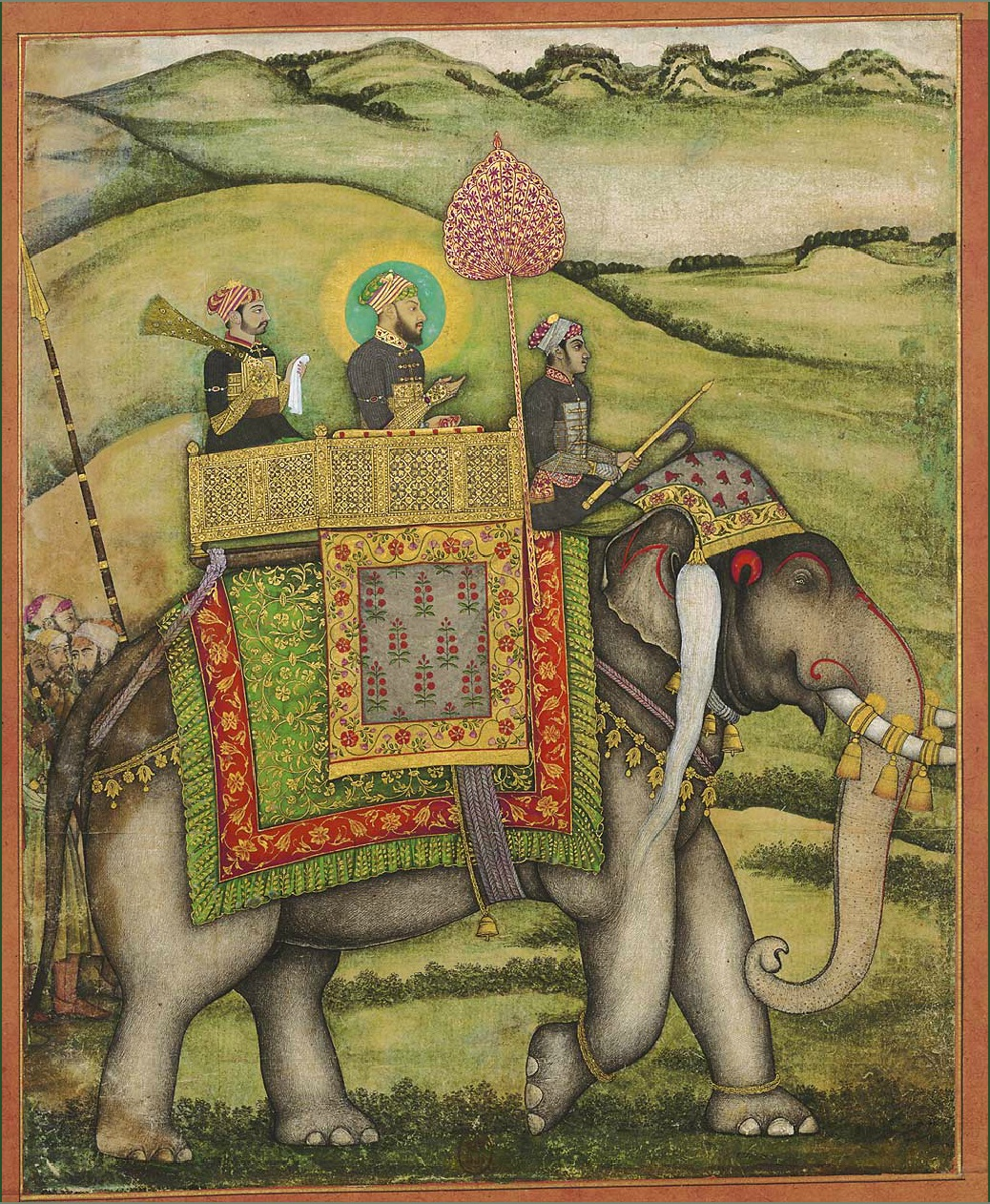
The Emperor Bahadur Shah I (1643–1712)

After Prince Mu'izz ud-Din Jahandar Shah, the eldest of Emperor Bahadur Shah's sons, had been appointed in 1694–95 to Multan province, Syed Hassan Ali Khan and his brother followed him there. Seeking to claim honor against the Baloch zamindar in an expedition, Jahandar Shah sought not to allow this, and assigned them under Isa Khan Main, his Punjabi Muslim administrator. Consequently, the Sayyids quit the service and went to Lahore, where they lived in comparative poverty, waiting for employment from Munim Khan II, the Nazim (convenor) of that place.

When Emperor Aurangzeb died and Prince Muhammad Mu'azzam Shah Alam, reached Lahore on his march to Agra to contest the throne, the Sayyids presented themselves and allied with Shah Alam. In the Battle of Jajau on 18 June 1707, they served in the vanguard where their brother, Syed Nur ud-Din Ali Khan, was left dead on the field, and Syed Hussain Ali Khan was severely wounded. Though their rank was raised to 4,000, and the elder brother received his father's title of Syed Mian, they were not treated with high favour either by the new emperor or his vizier.

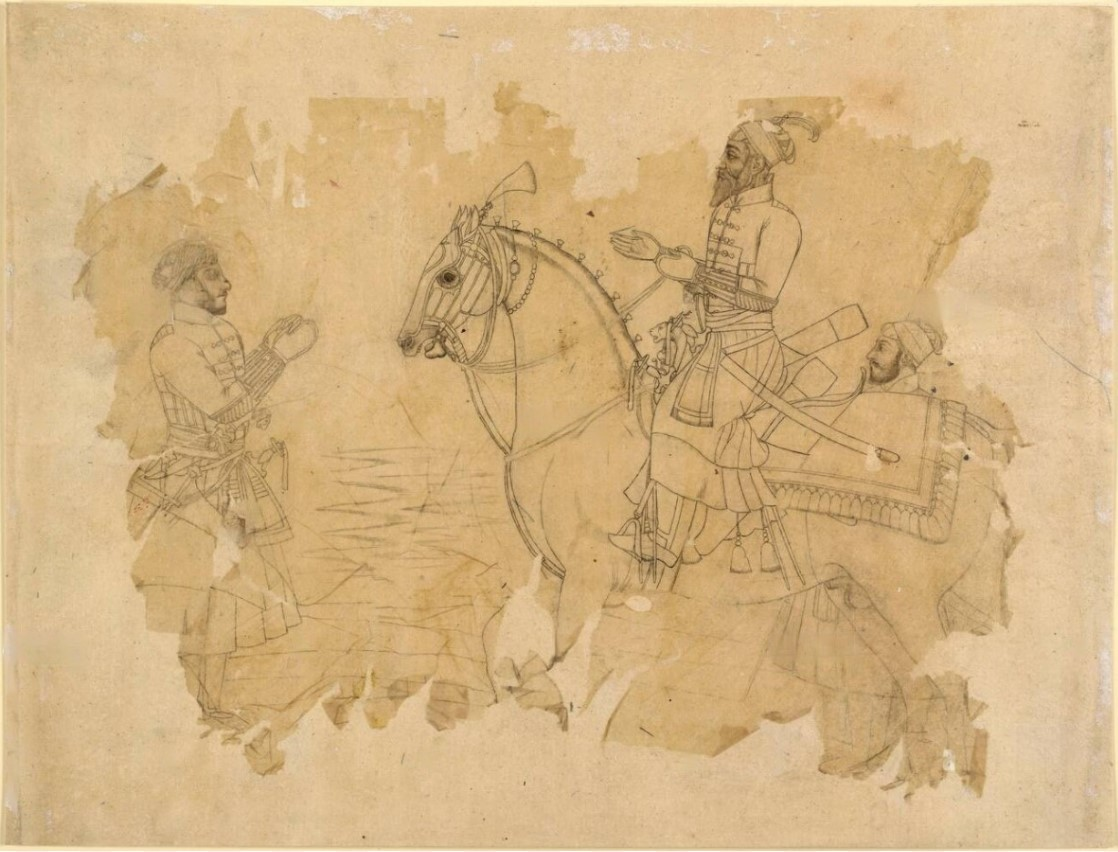
Bahadur Shah on horseback.

The two Sayyids quarrelled with Khanazad Khan, the Vizier Munim Khan's second son, and offended Jahandar Shah, though the conflict was settled from a visit by the vizier, there is little doubt that this difference helped to keep them out of employment. The morning after the Battle of Jajau, the Prince Jahandar Shah visited their quarters to condole with them on the death of their brother, Syed Nur ud-Din Ali Khan. Syed Hussain Ali Khan responded aggressively, which angered Jahandar Shah and so refrained from making any recommendation to his father in their favour. However, Syed Shujaat Khan Barha held the province of Ajmer, and another Sayyid Hussain Barha was made faujdar of Amber.

In April 1708, Prince Azim-ush-shan nominated the younger brother Syed Hussain Ali Khan, to represent him as the governor of Bihar, in the capital Azimabad (Patna). In October 1708, Syed Hassan Ali Khan was named subah of Ajmer, (then in a disturbed state owing to the Rajput rising) which displeased Syed Shuja'at Ali Khan Barha. When Syed Hassan Ali Khan almost reached Delhi, to raise new troops and make other preparations, Emperor Bahadur Shah, changed his mind and Shuja'at Ali Khan Barha was received again into favour and maintained in his government. Sayyid Saeed Khan Barha was placed in charge of the Kachawa capital at Amber. Prince Azim-ush-shan made Syed Hassan Ali Khan his deputy of Allahabad in January 1711. Khan-i Jahan Barha was made the faujdar of Moradabad.

== Farrukhsiyar's request to the Sayyids ==
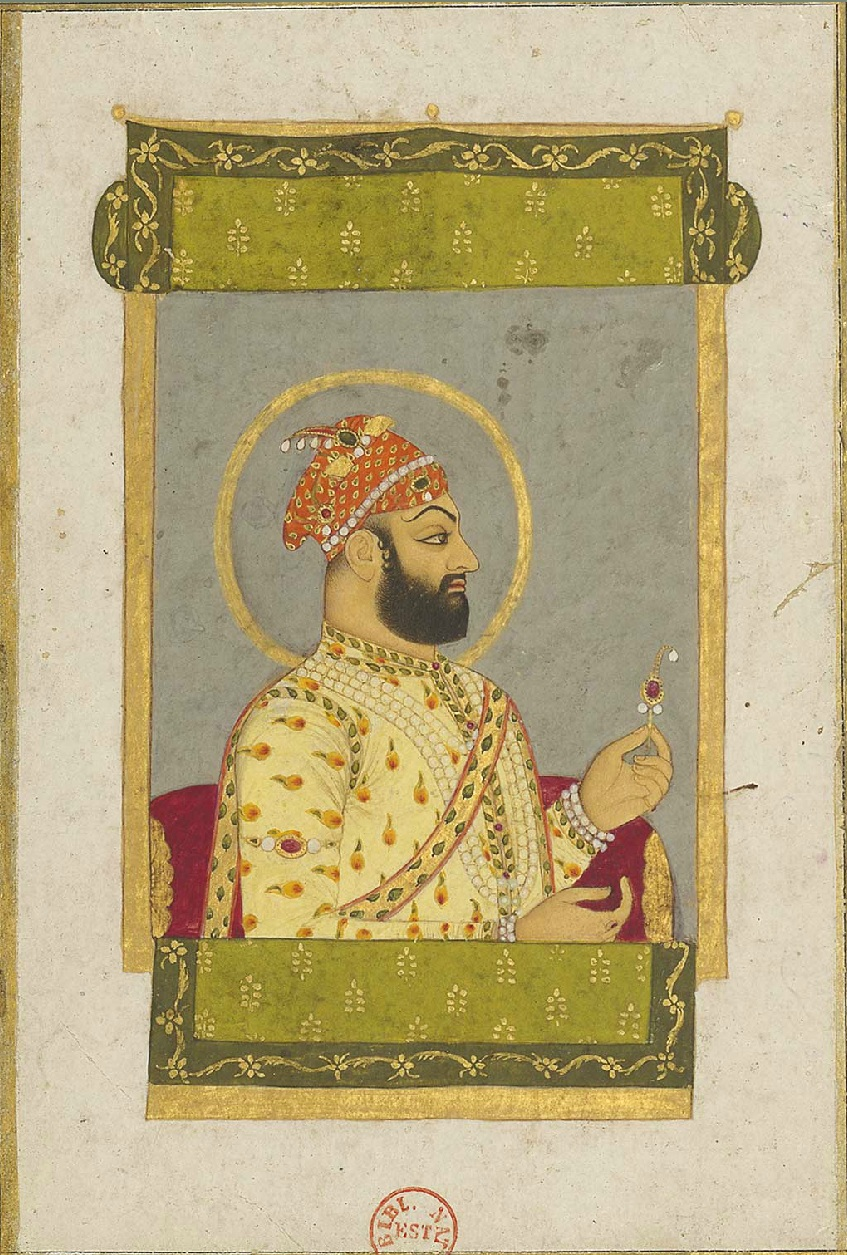
Mughal Emperor Farrukhsiyar

When Prince Farrukhsiyar first arrived at Azimabad, Syed Hussain Ali Khan was away recapturing the Rohtas fort of Bihar, which about this time had been seized by Muhammad Raza Rayat Khan. The Sayyids had felt annoyed on hearing that Farrukhsiyar had issued coin and caused the khutba to be read in his father, Prince Azim-ush-shan's, name, without waiting to learn the result of the impending struggle at Lahore. On returning to headquarters, he declined the Prince's overtures. The Prince's mother made a private visit to the Sayyid's mother, mentioning that the Sayyids were in their position due to the kindness of the Prince's father. That father, two brothers, and two uncles had been killed, and the Prince's own means were insufficient for any enterprise. The mother said "let Syed Hussain Ali Khan then choose his own course, either let him aid Prince Farrukhsiyar to recover his rights and revenge his father's death, or else let him place the Prince in chains and send him a prisoner to Emperor Jahandar Shah". The Sayyid's mother called her son into the harem and told him that "whatever was the result he would be a gainer: if defeated, his name would stand recorded as a hero till Judgment Day; if successful, the whole of Hindustan would be at their feet and above them none but the Emperor". Finally she exclaimed, "If you adhere to Emperor Jahandar Shah, you will have to answer before the Great Judge for disavowing your mother's claim upon you."

Syed Hussain Ali Khan then swore a binding oath that he would espouse the Prince's cause. The following night Prince Farrukhsiyar presented himself at the Khan's house, saying that he had come either to be seized and sent to Emperor Jahandar Shah or to enter into an agreement for the recovery of the throne. The Sayyid decided to fight on Prince Farrukhsiyar's behalf. He wrote at once to his elder brother, Syed Hassan Ali Khan Barha, at Allahabad, inviting him to join the same side, and Prince Farrukhsiyar addressed a firman to him making many promises, and authorising him to expend the Bengal treasure, then at Allahabad, on the enlistment of troops. The two chief postings in the Empire, those of Vizier and of Amir ul Umara were formally promised to the two brothers as their reward in case of success. Syed Hassan Ali Khan Barha, on being superseded at Allahabad, gives in his allegiance to Prince Farrukhsiyar.

== Mughal succession crises of 1712 ==
At first Syed Hassan Ali Khan's intention was to submit to Jahandar Shah, to whom he sent letters professing his loyalty and offering his services. Three months before the death of Emperor Bahadur Shah, he had gone to Jaunpur to restore order. In this he was not successful and the pay of his soldiers fell into arrears. The men raised a disturbance, and Syed Hassan Ali Khan's took shelter within the fort of Allahabad and promised to pay the troops once he reached the city. On the return march, word came of Emperor Bahadur Shah's death. While Syed Hassan Ali Khan was still in expectation of a favourable reply to his letter to Jahandar Shah, he was surprised to learn that Jahandar had lost favor from his own government and that a new governor (the province had been granted to a Raji Muhammad Khan, subah of Allahabad) was nominated, Syed Abdul Ghafoorr.

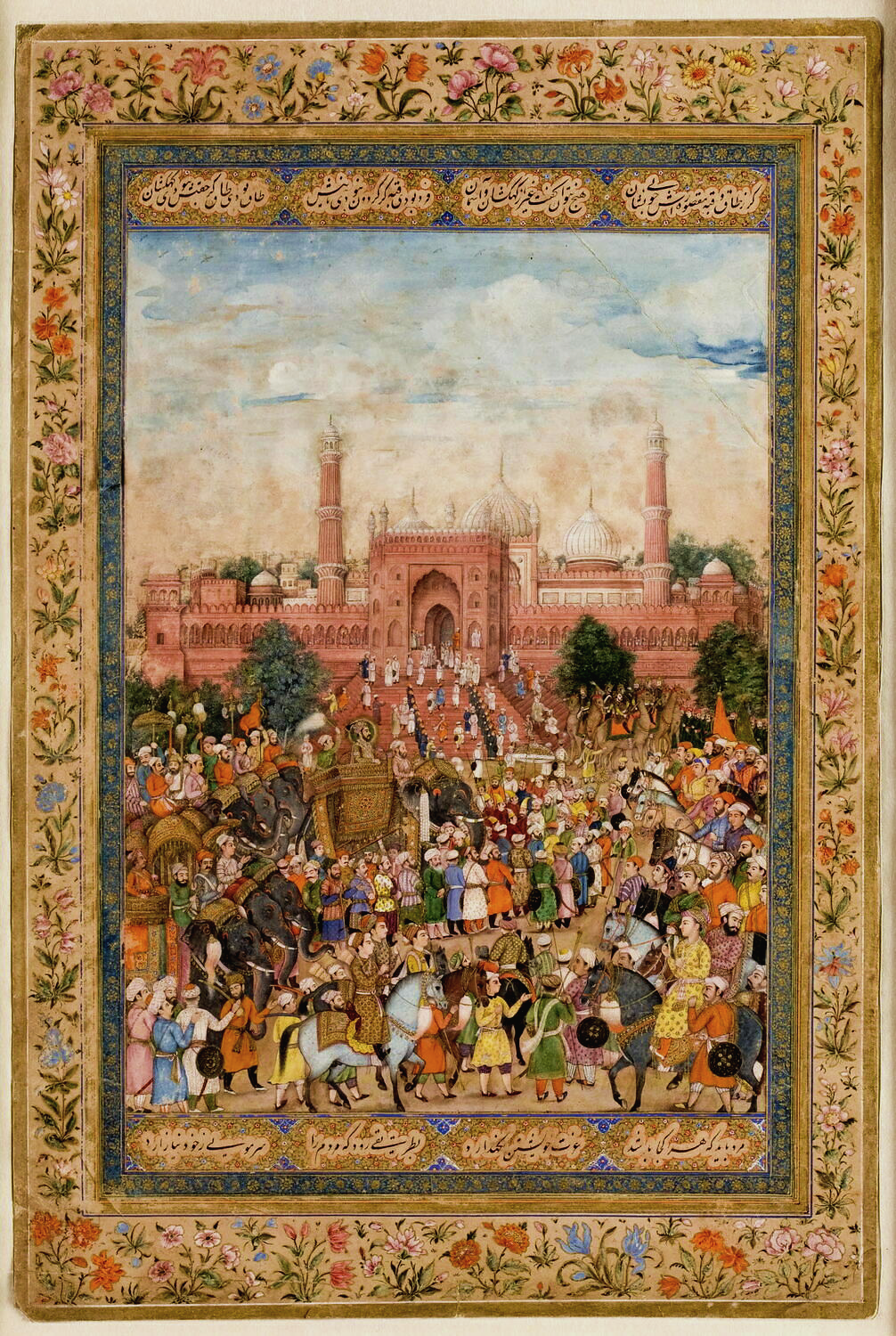
Farrukhsiyar arrives at the friday congregation

Syed Abdul Ghafoor obtained contingents from one or two zamindars and collected altogether 6,000 to 7,000 men. When he drew near to Karra Manikpur, Syed Abul Hasan Khan, a Sayyid of Bijapur, who was Syed Hassan Ali Khan Barha's Bakhshi, advanced at the head of 3,000 men to bar his progress. With Abul Hasan Khan's (who was allied to Syed Hassan Ali Khan) victory at the Battle of Sarai Alam Chand on 2 August 1712, it became clear that the Sayyids were allied against to Prince Farrukhsiyar, the new contender for the throne. Jahandar Shah confirmed Sayyid Hassan Ali Khan as governor of Allahabad.

Prince Farrukhsiyar, meanwhile, had marched out with an army along with Syed Hussain Ali Khan from Patna to Allahabad to join Syed Hassan Ali Khan. Emperor Jahandar Shah learning of the defeat of his general, Syed Abdul Ghafoor sent his own son Prince Azzu-ud-Din along with Generals Lutfullah Khan and Khwaja Hussain Khan Dauran to face this army. The Second Battle of Khajwah was fought in Fatehpur District, Uttar Pradesh on 28 November 1712. Prince Farrukhsiyar defeated Prince Azzu-ud-Din, and the General Lutfullah Khan of Panipat, Sayyid Muzaffar Khan Barha, the maternal uncle of Abdullah Khan, Sayyid Hassan Khan, the son of Hussain Ali Khan, and Sayyid Mustafa Khan, who were on the opposite side, joined the faction of Farrukhsiyar. This forced Jahandar Shah and his vizier to initiate the Battle of Agra on 10 January 1713, Prince Farrukhsiyar again won and became the Emperor of the Mughal Empire succeeding his uncle Jahandar Shah. Farrukhsiyar's revolt against Jahandar Shah was a risky pusuit, and his victory was due to the resources of the two Sayyid brothers.

== Rise of the Sayyid brothers ==
After his victory at the Battle of Agra in 1713, once Emperor Farrukhsiyar reached Delhi from Agre, conferred many new appointments and new titles on his generals and noblemen. Syed Hassan Ali Khan was awarded titles Nawab Qutb-ul-mulk, Yamin-ud-daulah, Syed Mian Saani, Bahadur Zafar Jung, Sipah-salar, Yar-i-wafadar and became Vizier. Syed Hussain Ali Khan was appointed first Bakhshi with the titles of Umdat-ul-mulk, Amir-ul-Umara, Bahadur, Feroze Jung, Sipah Sardar.

The Amir-ul-Umara Hussain Ali Khan, was inclined to the use of exaggerated and insolent language. Flatterers in the train of Hussain Ali Khan used to recite the verses in the emperor's presence:

"The whole world and all creation seeks the shelter of your umbrella,
Kings of the world earn crowns through your emprize."

== Rajputana Campaign of 1714 ==
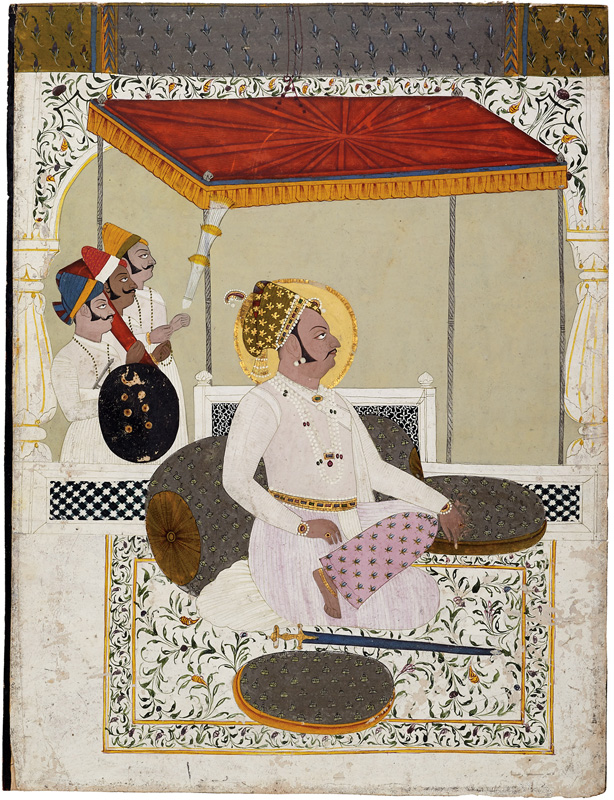
Ajit Singh of Marwar

The Rajput states had been in veiled revolt from the imperial authority for 50 years. Ajit Singh, Maharaja of Marwar, had taken advantage of the Mughal civil war to expel the Mughal commander from Marwar. Former Emperor Bahadur Shah had been unable to reduce Ajit's power. Ajit Singh, after forbidding the slaughtering cows by Muslims for food and also the call for prayer from the Alamgiri Mosque, had entered imperial territory and taken possession of Ajmer. The Rana of Udaipur and Jai Singh II were acting in close cooperation with him, and the latter had defeated Hussain Khan Barha of Mewat in the Battle of Sambhar. Early in Emperor Farrukhsiyar's reign it was determined that this encroachment must be put an end by marching against him.

Syed Hussain Ali Khan left Delhi on 6 January 1714 and Ajit Singh, "upon learning of the march of this army, was alarmed at its strength and at the prowess of the Sayyids." In Ajmer, Syed Hussain Ali Khan burnt the villages belonging to Marwar, while those belonging to Amber State were left unharmed. The country was thus settled and brought under imperial rule gradually. Syed Hussain Ali Khan overran Jodhpur and compelled the rebel Ajit Singh to flee and take refuge in the hills. After a brief campaign, Raghunath, a munshi in the service of Ajit Singh came to negotiate peace with Syed Hussain Ali Khan. The terms were that Ajit Singh should give one of his daughters in marriage to Farrukhsiyar. Roshan-ud-Daulah arrived at court on 18 May 1714 with the news.

== Rebellion of Churaman Jat ==
On the advice of the Syed brothers, the emperor Farrukhsiyar had sent Jai Singh, Maharaja of Amber, who had taken part in his father's campaigns against the Jats as a boy, in an expedition against Churaman Jat, resulting in a siege that lasted 12 months. The Sayyids appointed their uncle Sayyid Khan-i-Jahan Barha to command a second army. Churaman made overtures to the Wazir Qutb-ul-Mulk, offering tribute and surrendered his fortresses. Churaman Jat became a new favorite of the Sayyids, which became a useful ally until the death of the Sayyids.

== Court factions ==
The early Mughals were Turco-Mongol origin, and gradually absorbed Indian culture along with Central Asian influences. The influence of Indian culture was extremely pronounced, as the Mughals successively married into the Hindu Rajput dynasties and became Indianised, and all the Mughal emperors since Akbar had high-caste Hindu Rajput wives, and in most cases, mothers, including Jahangir and Shah Jahan. There were also significant Turkish and Irani officials in the Mughal court, and many of the Mughal princesses and wives that were a part of the large Mughal royal harem were of Persian or Turkish descent.

Hussain Ali Khan entertaining his brothers

As Farrukhsiyar was unable to overthrow the Sayyid brothers by himself, he raised the emperor's party with the aim to overthrow the Sayyids. For this task he chose Khan-i Dauran (an Indian Muslim of Agra), Mir Jumla, Shaista Khan (Inayatullah Kashmiri, an old Alamgiri noble), and later, Itiqad Khan, the last whom he chose as the future Wazir. Itiqad Khan was related by marriage to Farrukhsiyar's mother, who was also of Kashmiri descent.

There were other blocs of power such as the Irani faction, related by marriage to the court. The leader of this faction, Zulfiqar Khan, was a Shi'a Persian noble born in India, and it relied on Indian power-holders of various origin. The faction, during the year-long reign of Jahandar Shah, found opposition to Kolkatash Khan. With the overthrow of Jahandar Shah, and the execution of Zulfiqar Khan by the Sayyid Brothers, an Indo-Muslim party came into ascendance under the Sayyid faction. The Sayyid party which ruled during the reign of Farrukhsiyar was a powerful faction linked by ties of blood and marriage. The Sayyid party was distinct from other factions as the Sayyid leaders recruited very few who were neither Sayyids, nor Muslim. As the bulk of their troops were their own Sayyid clanmen, the Sayyids had greater strength and cohesion than other factions in the Mughal court. The Sayyids had developed a sort of common brotherhood among themselves and took up the cause of every individual as an insult to the whole group. They were strongly united around their leaders, Qutb-ul-Mulk and Amir-ul-Umara Hussain Ali Khan. The unique privilege of the Sayyids in leading the imperial vanguard also gave them an advantage over other parts of the Mughal military and exalted their sense of social pride.

The Sayyid party continuously tried to counteract Farrukhsiyar's plots to attain self-rule. Another bloc, the Turanis, also formed an opposition to Sayyid rule. The Turanis were not in a position to sufficiently act as a power pressure group against the Sayyids, or to bargain from a position of strength, and Farrukhsiyar did not trust the group as he suspected they would attempt to weaken him. There was a continual struggle for power between the Indian Muslim, Irani and Turani blocs at court, and each attempted to win the favour of the emperor in order to counter the other factions.

== Farrukhsiyar's struggles with the Sayyids ==
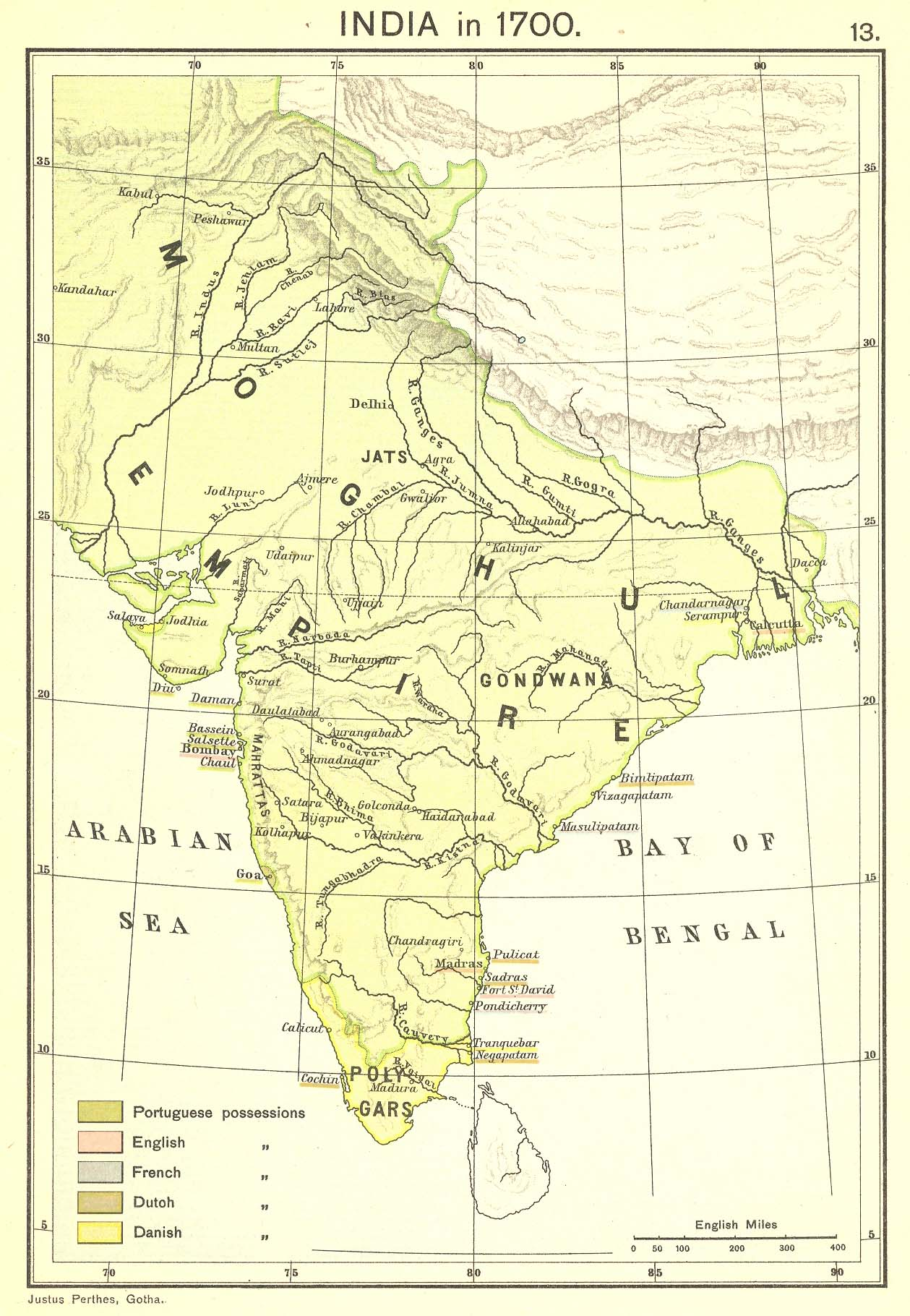
The Sayyid Brothers had considerably reduced the power of Mughal Empire until they were finally overthrown by Nizam-ul-Mulk.

The Sayyids saw Farrukhsiyar's accession to the throne as their doing, and resented the grant of any sharing of power to other persons. On the other hand, the small group of Farrukhsiyar's intimates, men who had known him from his childhood and stood on the most familiar terms with him, such as Khan-i Dauran, were aggrieved at their exclusion from a share in the spoils, but did not believe they were strong enough to counter the Sayyids openly. Their plan, therefore was to work upon the weak-minded Farrukhsiyar by telling him:

"The Sayyids look upon you as their creation, and think nothing of you or your power. They hold the two chief civil and military officers, their relations and friends have the principal other offices, and the most profitable land assignments (jagirs). Their power will go on increasing, until should they enter on treasonable projects, there will be no one to resist them."

Neither Farrukhsiyar nor his favorites dared to attack them openly, and Farrukhsiyar was obliged to submit to the Sayyid brothers, but continued his intrigues. Farrukhsiyar had obtained the throne largely due to the martial kills of the Sayyid Brothers, who, from Barha had provided contingents to the imperial armies. Even as Emperor, he lacked revenues to fund his own forces, as he could not confront the Syed Brothers. Further, the Syed Brothers threatened to enthrone another imperial family member whenever Farrukhsiyar proved too demanding. Farrukhsiyar was forced to turn to other nobles, who were to be raised on an equal position to them. The Sayyid Brothers, resisted the raising of other nobles to power. During the Mir Bakhshi's absence during the Rajputana campaign, Farrukhsiyar started raising funds to raise troops for Khwaja Asim Khan-i Dauran and Ubaidullah Mir Jumla II in opposition to the Sayyid brothers. Khan-i Dauran was put at the head of 5,000 Wala-Shahis, while Mir Jumla was given 5,000 Mughal troops, recruited by his adopted son, Amanat Khan.

Being a man of the sword and a soldier, Syed Hassan Ali Khan had no natural taste for civil and financial administration, and found no opportunity in acquiring such experience. The Sayyids had historically served military roles rather than as administrators. This Wazir was endowed with virtues of courage and generosity, but lacked the zeal for public service and resisted the drudgery of office work. Ratan Chand, a Hindu Baniya of Jansath near the Sayyids home was appointed instead by Abdullah to his clerical work and trusted him with the financial affairs of the state that was meant for the Wazir. He had been recently created a Raja with the rank of 2,000 zat in 1712 by Farrukhsiyar, and came to be regarded as a very effective administrator. He was even entrusted with appointment of kazis. While it was usually the Wazir who brought candidates to the Emperor, Mir Jumla instead independently did this. As the Wazir suffered in influence, the Sayyids felt aggrieved, and Abdullah Khan now wrote letters to his brother to return to Delhi with all possible speed from his campaign in Rajputana. The Mir Bakhshi reached the capital on 16 July 1714.

Mir Jumla, having no real strength of character, made excuses during talks and drew to one side. While Khan Dauran was frightened that if he should ever be called on to take the lead, he may lose his life in the attempt to destroy the Sayyids. As for the Emperor, his own troops were much weaker to the Sayyids. The imperial and Wala-shahi troops comprised many low-caste men and mere artisans held commands. As the Emperor was aware of the unity and the firm resolve of the Syed Brothers, decided once more to resume friendly relations with them. In December 1714, the Syed Brothers assembled their troops and possessed themselves of the gates of the citadel containing the Emperor's palace, proposing terms of reconciliation.

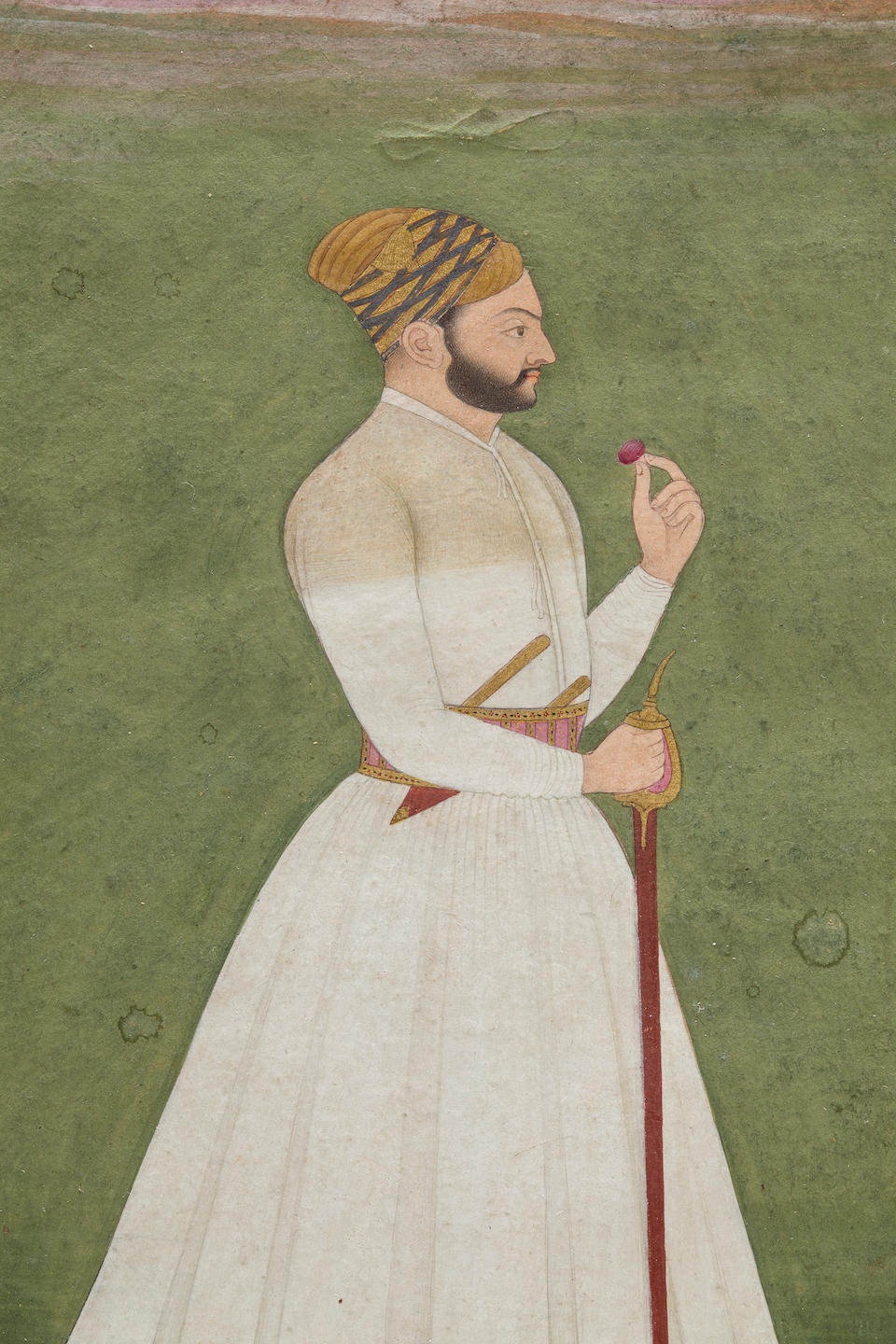
Portrait of Lutfullah Khan Sadiq Panipati

The Sayyid Brothers' terms were that they would not reconcile unless Mir Jumla and Khan-i Dauran were dismissed. Islam Khan V, Sayyid Hussain Khan Barha, Sayyid Shujaat Khan Barha and Khwaja Jafar would negotiate a settlement whereby Mir Jumla was forced out of office in Delhi and sent to Bihar on 16 December 1714. However, Khan-i Dauran was spared due to the intercession of his brother Khwaja Jafar, who was a holy man, who swore that Khan-i Dauran would never act against the Sayyid Brothers. Lutfullah Khan Sadiq, Farrukhsiyar's closest advisor, who was despised by the Sayyid Brothers, was deprived of his rank, and his mansions and gardens were confiscated. Successive agents chosen by Farrukhsiyar gave up the attempt and went over to the Sayyids as they were seen to be more capable in protecting their own interests.

Syed Hussain Ali Khan entered the palace with his men, observing the same precautions as in the case of Syed Hassan Ali Khan Barha. Some months before this time Hussain Ali Khan had obtained in his own favour a grant of the Deccan provinces, but he had meant to exercise the government through a deputy, Daud Khan Panni. Now it was proposed that Hussain Ali Khan would leave court and take over charge of the Deccan himself. Khan-i Dauran was appointed as the deputy of Hussain Ali Khan in his duties as Mir Bakhshi.

== Deccan campaigns ==
Sayyid Hussain Ali Khan was appointed the Viceroy of the Deccan. In an unprecedented measure, he was given a grand seal which gave him full authority to assign jagirs in the Deccan, appoint and dismiss officers and commandants of the great fortresses, which were previously jealously guarded by the Mughal royals in order to serve as a counterweight against overly ambitious provincials.

He rejected his predecessor Daud Khan Panni's agreements of tribute to the Marathas. Farrukhsiyar sent Daud Khan Panni, the newly appointed governor of Burhanpur, a secret message to attack and kill Hussain Khan, if possible. Daud Khan Panni attempted to gain the backing of the Marathas in order to attack Hussain Khan, while the Nizam left in disgust. However, at the Battle of Burhanpur, Daud Khan was easily defeated and killed by Hussain Khan, who captured Farrukhsiyar's letters to the rebel at his camp. The Marathas had remained inactive during the battle.

Hussain Khan was eager to establish his firm hold over the Deccan. Without much precaution, he declared hostility to the Marathas. As a result, Maratha raiding and indecisive open warfare continued. In 1717, his general Zulfiqar Beg sent 4,000 horse and 2,000 infantry to punish Khandoji Dabhade, who was defeated and killed. In order to avenge his death, Syed Hussain Ali Khan sent Muhakkam Singh, the son of Churaman Jat (who was loyal to the Barha Sayyids), and his brother Saif-ud-Din Khan Barha, to punish the Marathas. Dahbade and his Marathas, who were plundering Khandesh, were defeated at a battle near Ahmadnagar. The army dispersed and fled, after which Syed Hussain Ali Khan ravaged the Maratha territory up to the suburbs of Satara. In these campaigns he was assisted by the Maratha chiefs Chandrasen Jadhav and Nemaji Sindhia.

In 1717, fearing that the Sayyid brothers would replace him, Farrukhsiyar blinded three princes who had the potential to be raised to the throne, including his younger brother.

=== Negotiating ===
Sayyid brothers were accused of treachery due to their abilities to negotiate peace with the Maratha Confederacy.

== Short-reign emperors ==
=== Enthronement of Rafi-ad-Darajat ===
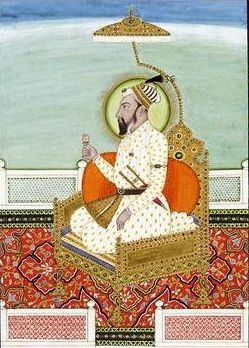
Rafi ud-Darajat

The Sayyid Brothers raised Rafi-ud-Darajat to the throne, a grandson of Bahadur Shah I, who was 20 years old. Rafi-ud-Darajat was no more than a show-piece, as he could not be served food and water without the permission of the Sayyid Brothers. Hussain Ali Khan exercised complete authority. As Rafi-ad-Darajat was in an advanced stage of consumption, he was deposed on June 4, 1719 and died a week later after his deposition.

=== Rebellion of Prince Nikusiyar ===
The rivals of the Syed Brothers proclaimed Nikusiyar, another puppet-king, as emperor. Abdullah Khan favoured Nikusiyar, against the wishes of Hussain Khan. Hussain's view prevailed, and the Syed Brothers defeated Nikusiyar and his allies. Hussain Khan besieged Agra in June, and Nikusiyar surrendered in August. Nikusiyar was sent to prison where he died. His supporter, Mitrasen, committed suicide and the Sayyid Brothers fought Jai Singh of Jaipur. At Fatehpur Sikri, they divided the spoils of Agra amongst themselves.

=== Enthronement of Shah Jahan II ===
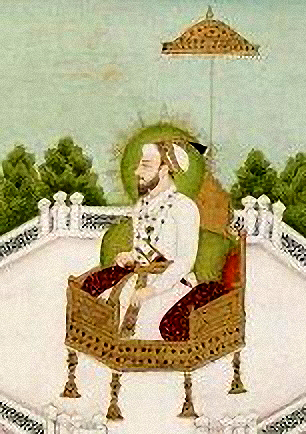
Shah Jahan II

Rafi-ud-Daulah was enthroned as Shah Jahan II. He, too, lived within the fort, as a prisoner of the Sayyid Brothers, and was not allowed independence even in his private life. Inayatullah Kashmiri, who was the maternal uncle of Farrukhsiyar, raised an army for overthrowing the Sayyids. But in June, 1719, Inayatullah Khan was seized at Delhi and thrown into prison.

== End of the Sayyid brothers ==
Contemporary evidence suggests that public opinion did not approve of Farrukhsiyar, but turned against the Sayyid Brothers after his execution. The way in which members of the imperial family were treated provoked an outburst of anger. The rising power of the Sayyid brothers aroused the jealousy of other nobles, including the Iranis and Turanis, whose status had been reduced. As a result, they formed a force of counter-revolution against the Sayyid brothers under the leadership of Nizam-ul-Mulk. To subdue the counter-revolution, the Sayyid brothers shifted Nizam-ul-mulk from Delhi and he was appointed as Subahdar of Malwa. In due course Nizam captured the forts of Asirgarh and Burhanpur in the Deccan. Moreover, Nizam had also killed Mir Alam Ali Khan, the adopted son of Syed Hussain Ali Khan, who was the Deputy Subahdar of the Deccan.

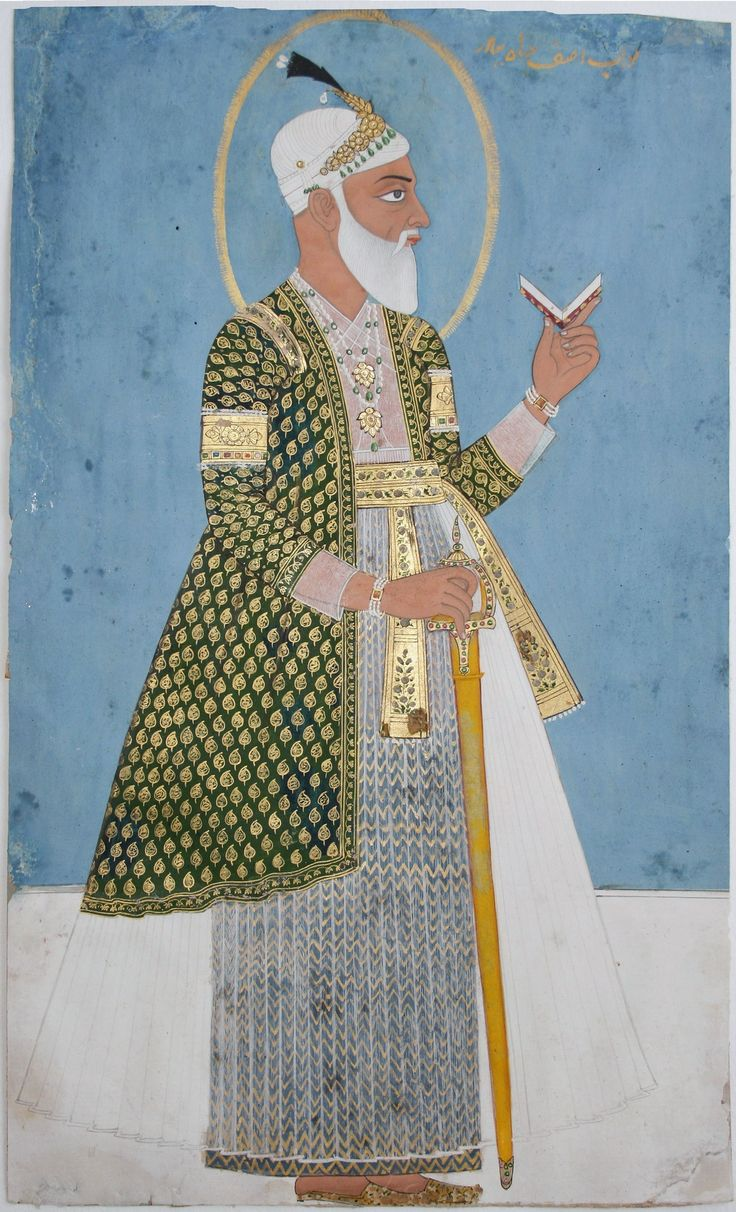
Nizam-ul-Mulk was instated as the Grand Vizier of the Mughal Empire, by Muhammad Shah on 21 February 1722, to overthrow the Sayyid Brothers.

Meanwhile, in Delhi, a plot was devised against the Sayyid brothers. Syed Hussain Ali Khan was ultimately killed by Haider Beg of the Dughlat clan on 9 October 1720. Syed Hassan Ali Khan with a big army set out to avenge his brother's murder but he was defeated at Shahpur (later Hasanpur in Haryana) on 15–16 November 1720 and was imprisoned. Bringing the protracted career of the Sayyid brothers to an end.

== Aftermath ==
Sayyid Abdullah Khan remained a prisoner in the citadel of Delhi for another two years, under the charge of Haider Quli Khan. He was "treated with respect, receiving delicate food to eat and fine clothes to wear". But so long as he survived, the Mughals remained uneasy, not knowing what sudden change of fortune might happen. Thus the nobles never ceased their efforts in alarming Muhammad Shah.

The Barha Sayyids held their ground at the Battle of Hasanpur, then retreated and evacuated their families to Jansath (friendly territory of the Sayyids). One of the relative of Qutb-ul-Mulk was discovered while taking refuge in a house attached to the Sayyids. She was taken to Muhammad Shah's mother, who proposed her marriage to the emperor, but Qutb-ul-Mulk objected, and the idea was dropped by Muhammad.

In order to reduce the power of the Turani nobles, Muhammad Shah thought of using the services of Qutb-ul-Mulk after setting him free and raising him to a high mansab. But Qutb-ul-Mulk's opponents had him poisoned to death on 12 October 1722. In 1723 Muhammad Shah released Sayyid Najmuddin Ali Khan Barha from prison to defeat Hamid Khan and Nizam-ul-Mulk in their separatist policy in Gujarat, and as a result Najmuddin Ali Khan Barha was given the governorship of Ajmer after the defeat of Hamid Khan.

== See also ==
- Saadat-e-Bara, a community of Sayyids, which had considerable influence during the reign of the Mughal Empire
- Saadat Khan He played a major role in the overthrow of the Sayyid Brothers
- Sadaat-e-Bilgram
