= Tharwat (name) =

Tharwat or Sarwat (Arabic or Urdu: ثروت) is a given name and surname derived from the Arabic word (tharwa ثروة) meaning treasure. Notable people with the name include:

== Given name ==
- Tharwat Abaza (1927–2002), Egyptian journalist and novelist
- Tharwat Alhajjaj (born 1973), Paralympic weightlifter from Jordan
- Tharwat Bassily (1940–2017), Egyptian businessman
- Tharwat Bendary (born 1970), Egyptian weightlifter
- Sarwat Gilani (born 1982), Pakistani model and film, television and voice actress
- Sarwat Nazir, Pakistani fiction and screen writer
- Tharwat Okasha (1921–2012), Egyptian writer, translator and government official

== Surname ==
- Abdel Khalek Sarwat Pasha (1873–1928), Egyptian politician
- Zubaida Tharwat (1940–2016), Egyptian film, stage and television actress

== See also ==
- Servet, the Turkish and Albanian form of Tharwat
