= Sambalhera =

Sambalhera Sambhalhera Sadaat
- Village
- Location within Uttar Pradesh Location within India
- Coordinates: 29°19′30″N 77°55′10″E
- Country: India
- State: Uttar Pradesh
- Elevation: 242 m (794 ft)

Population (census 2011)
  - Total: 10,542

Languages
  - Official: Hindi,
- Time zone: UTC+5:30 (IST)
- PIN: 251315
- Nearest city: Jansath, Muzaffarnagar
- Literacy: 55%
- Climate: cold (Köppen)

Sambalhera is an ancient village in Jansath Tehsil of Muzaffarnagar district, Uttar Pradesh, India, 6 km from Jansath town. Chhatraudi branch of Sadat Bahera settled here in the 11th century. Many ancient and medieval tombs of Barha generals are still there.

== History ==
Sayyid Hasan Fakhruddin was the first Zaidi Sayyid who settled down here in 1104/1106 AD, who came here from Chattbanur, a village in Patiala district of Punjab, India. Sayyid Hasan's mazaar is in Sambhalhera. Sayyid Hasan was a direct descendant of Sayyid Abu'l Farah Al Hussaini Al Wasti, who came to India from Wasit, a town of Iraq situated on Iraq-Iran border, on the request of Mahmoud of Ghazni. By the beginning of the 20th century, Zaidi Sadaat originating from Sambalhera were living in about 85 cities in India.

Sambalhera is listed in the Ain-i-Akbari as a pargana under the sarkar of Saharanpur, producing a revenue of 1,011,078 dams for the imperial treasury. It is not mentioned as providing soldiers to the Mughal army, but the presence of its Sayyid community is noted.

== Places ==
This village is one of the biggest villages in the area, having a population of more than 12,000 people. People from all the religions there are living peacefully and celebrate each other's happiness.

Half a kilometer away is the ancient Shri Krishan Rudeshwar Panchmukhi Mahadev Siddhpeeth of Pashupati Nath temple (temple of Shiva). This temple placed third in Asia. There is a fruit garden near the temple.

For more information you can go to page:- https://www.facebook.com/panchmukhishiva/info#

It was built in the 18th century.

Many people visit the temple to worship of God. On the occasion of every festival like Mahashivratri, Navratras, Shri Krishan Janmashtmi, a Bhandara is organized by the villagers collectively.

== Occupation ==
In the old days agricultural activities were the primary occupation. Now, villagers also earn money by providing services, going out in search of jobs. Many villagers work abroad, but others work in India in both the private and public sectors.

== See also ==
- Sadaat-e-Bara
