= Itinerario =

- Discipline: History of colonialism
- Language: English
- Edited by: Cátia Antunes and Isaac McKean Scarborough

Publication details
- History: 1976–present
- Publisher: Cambridge University Press on behalf of the Leiden Institute for History
- Frequency: Triannually

Standard abbreviations
- ISO 4: Itinerario

Indexing
- ISSN: 0165-1153 (print); 2041-2827 (web)
- LCCN: 99109016
- OCLC no.: 191709423

Links
- Journal homepage; Online access; Online archive

Itinerario is a peer-reviewed academic journal of history published three times a year by Cambridge University Press on behalf of the Leiden Institute for History (Leiden University). It covers research on the expansion of Europe in the context of colonialism between about 1500 and 1950. The journal publishes original research articles, archival notes, interviews, and reviews. Itinerario is also affiliated to the Forum for European Expansion and Global Interaction.
