= Gilawat Aminabad =

Gilawat Aminabad गिलवट अमीनाबाद
- Village
- Location in Kanpur, Uttar Pradesh, India Gilawat Aminabad (India)
- Coordinates: 26.9080°N 80.0410°E
- Country: India
- State: Uttar Pradesh
- District: Kanpur Nagar

Population (2011 Census of India)
  - Total: 987

Languages
  - Official: Hindi
- Time zone: UTC+5:30 (IST)
- PIN: 209202
- Vehicle registration: UP-78

Gilawat Aminabad is a village and Gram panchayat in Bilhaur Tehsil, Kanpur Nagar district, Uttar Pradesh, India. Its village code is 149905. As per 2011 Census of India report the population of the village is 987 where 540 are men and 447 are women. It is located 65 KM towards North from Kanpur.
