= Palri, Charkhi Dadri =

Village in Haryana, India

Palri
- Village
- Location in Haryana, India Palri (India)
- Coordinates: 28.4459°N 76.1677°E
- Country: India
- State: Haryana

Government
  - Body: Village panchayat

Population (2011)
  - Total: 3,617

Languages
  - Official: Hindi
- Time zone: UTC+5:30 (IST)
- PIN: 127310

Palri is a village is on State Highway 17 (Haryana) in the sub district Dadri of the Bhiwani district in the Indian state of Haryana.

== Demographics ==
As of 2011 India census, the total population is 3617, with 1878 males and 1739 females. The rural population is divided into literate, illiterate, main working, main cultivators, and other workers.

The rural population includes 930, with 736 males, 194 females main agricultural laborers. The main cultivator population is composed of 543, with 422 males, and 121 females. The main agricultural laborers population is 59, with 42 males and 17 females. The main household industry population is 43, with 12 males and 31 females.

The rural other workers population is 285 males and 260 females. The marginal worker population of 1077, with 266 males, 811 females.

The rural cultivator population of 831 is divided into 181 males and 650 females. The marginal worker population of 3–6 months are 777 males, 177 females, 600 males. and The rural cultivators population is divided into six groups: literate, illiterate, main working, main cultivator, and other workers.

Non working population is 1610, with 876 males and 734 females.

In summary, the rural population of Haryana Bhiwani Dalri Palri is diverse and includes various groups such as rural, urban, and sub-district. The rural cultivators and other workers contribute significantly to the overall population and economy of the region.
