= Kaithora, Jaunpur =

Kaithora
- Village
- Location in Uttar Pradesh, India
- Coordinates: 25°57′05″N 82°21′41″E
- Country: India
- State: Uttar Pradesh
- District: Jaunpur
- Subdistrict: Badlapur

Population (2011)
  - Total: 655
- Time zone: UTC+05:30 (IST)

Kaithora is a village in Badlapur tahsil, Jaunpur district, Uttar Pradesh, India. The population was 655 at the 2011 Indian census.
