= Servet =

Servet is a Turkish and Albanian unisex given name. Notable people with the name include:

== Given name ==
- Servet Teufik Agaj, Albanian footballer
- Servet Çetin (born 1981), Turkish footballer
- Servet Coşkun (born 1990), Turkish sport wrestler
- Servet A. Duran (1920–1996), Turkish-American Materials Science professor
- Servet Kocakaya (born 1973), Turkish singer of Kurdish origin
- Servet Koçyiğit (born 1971), Turkish-Dutch visual artist
- Servet Libohova, Albanian politician
- Servet Pëllumbi (1936–2026), Albanian politician
- Servet Tazegül (born 1988), Turkish taekwondo athlete
- Servet Uzunlar (born 1989), Turkish–Australian footballer
- Servet Yardımcı (born 1957), Turkish sports official
- Ethem Servet Boral (1876–1956?), Ottoman officer

== Surname ==
- Miguel Servet (died 1553), Spanish theologian and physician

== Other uses ==
- Servet (newspaper), newspaper in the Ottoman Empire
- Servet (TV series), 2018 Turkish series

== See also ==
- 9629 Servet, main-belt asteroid
