= Dirk H. A. Kolff =

Dutch historian and Indologist

Dirk Herbert Arnold Kolff
- Born: February 11, 1938 (age 88); Rotterdam, the Netherlands
- Occupations: Historian; Indologist
- Board member of: The Netherlands–India Friendship Association (President)

Academic background
- Education: Doctor of Philosophy
- Alma mater: Leiden University (M.A. and Ph.D.)
- Thesis: An Armed Peasantry and Its Allies: Rajput Tradition and State Formation, 1450–1850 (1983)
- Doctoral advisor: Jan C. Heesterman

Academic work
- Discipline: History; Indology
- Institutions: Former Chair of Indian History, Leiden University
- Main interests: Armed peasants (North India); Dynamics of Mughal Empire; Muslim rulers of India

Dirk Herbert Arnold Kolff (born 11 February 1938) is a Dutch historian and Indologist. Born at Rotterdam in the Netherlands, Kolff earned a doctorate degree from the Leiden University in 1983 with a doctoral thesis on the research subject of armed peasantry in northern India. He is a professor emeritus of modern South Asian history and the former Chair of Indian History at the Leiden University.

He is the co-founder of the European Association of South Asian Studies and the president of the Netherlands–India Friendship Association.

== Education and career ==
Kolff did M.A. in 1967 at the Leiden University. Later that year, he moved to London on scholarship from the British Council. From 1968 to 1970, he performed field research on agrarian history in India's Allahabad and Jhansi. From 1971 to 1991, he taught the history of South Asia as an associate professor at the Kern Institute of Leiden University in the Netherlands while also completing his Ph.D. at the university in 1983. He was at the University of Chicago as a visiting associate professor in 1989. From 1987 to 1993, he served as the co-editor of Itinerario.

Kolff, from 1991 till his retirement in 2003, taught modern history of South Asia at the Leiden University, and from 1992 to 1997, was also the director of Research School of Asian, African, and Amerindian Studies (CNWS) of the university. At the time of his retirement, he was serving as the 'Chair of Indian History' at the university. From 1992 to 1998, he was a board member of the Indo–Dutch Programme for Alternatives in Development (IDPAD) and the J. Gonda Stichting of the Royal Netherlands Academy of Arts and Sciences (KNAW). Since 1992, he is a member of the editorial board of the Gonda Indological Studies series. He is one of the founders of the European Association of South Asian Studies (EASAS), and since 1995, he is the secretary of the EASAS. From 1 September 1999 to 30 June 2000, he was a research fellow at the Netherlands Institute for Advanced Study. He is the president of the Netherlands–India Friendship Association since 2012, and had also served as its president from 1996 to 2004.

== Research ==
Kolff is a historian and Indologist. Jan C. Heesterman noted that the research interests of Kolff included "India's muslim rulers" and "the working and enduring vitality" of the dynamics of Mughal Empire. Heesterman wrote, "focussing attention on India's 'armed peasantry' in its various guises of both sedentary 'ryots' and itinerant warriors, Kolff brings out the flexibility and dynamics of the Mughal world that was known to its European contemporaries as the 'flourishing Indies'." According to Heesterman, his research played a substantial role in the "fundamental change" in the historiographical approach towards the study of India's history during the Mughal era (1526–1857 CE), which has placed the "dynamics of Indian society" during that period at the forefront of research studies. Earlier, the period was seen in "the static terms of 'oriental society,' the perennial 'village community' and unchangeable rigidities of caste and community".

Kolff's research threw light on a "fluid" and "pervasive" military labor market in India's northern region during the later years of Mughal Empire and the initial years of the British Raj as part of which, fighters who were mostly armed peasants, used to be at the disposal of the kings, mutineers, and military contractors in the region. He highlighted that during this time in the conflict-ridden north Indian society, the regional armed peasants had "considerable agency and independence" in the society. He has theorized that before the establishment of the British Raj in India, an enormous military labor market was widespread in the country. According to John F. Richards of the Duke University, his research is of assistance in underscoring "the magnitude of the changes wrought in Indian society by violent British conquest, pacification and disarmament in rural society—especially after the failed 1857 revolt".

== Written work ==
Kolff's Naukar, Rajput and Sepoy: The Ethnohistory of the Military Labour Market in Hindustan, 1450–1850 (1990) was "an ethnohistory in a military setting", not "a military history with a focus of ethnicity", which according to Kolff was "undertaken at the confluence of anthropology, history and Indology". Kolff coined the term "military labour market", and in the book, introduced this concept on a wide scale in context of the northern region of India. According to University of Cambridge's Randolf G. S. Cooper, Kolff clarified the "understanding of the way in which military service had a life cycle or commodity exchange value that was integral to South Asian society and realpolitik". Cooper further stated that Kolff's work is of assistance in breaking the stereotypical image of the Rajputs as "the saffron robed warrior prince on horseback". Cooper, however, suggested that though Kolff attempted to provide a study of the subject matter from 1450 CE to 1850 CE, it was highly constricted to the 16th and 17th centuries "from the standpoint of functional strength".

University of Akron's A. Martin Wainwright noted that, in the book, Kolff shed light on the "historical pervasiveness of caste in Indian society" and the genesis of Indian State. Wainwright further observed that Kolff presented "new insights" into the "formation of state structures" and "character of peasant society" in India's northern region from the mid-15th century till the Indian Rebellion of 1857, and challenged the "long-held assumptions about the nature of military power and peasant society in northern India before British ascendance".

== Works ==
=== Books authored ===
- Kolff, Dirk H. A. (2010). Bronkhorst, Johannes (ed.). Grass in Their Mouths: The Upper Doab of India Under the Company's Magna Charta, 1793–1830. Brill's Indological Library, Volume 33. Boston, Massachusetts, USA; Leiden, Netherlands: Brill. ISBN 978-9004188020. LCCN 2010026465. OCLC 714838726.
- Kolff, Dirk H. A. (2002) [First published 1990]. Naukar, Rajput, and Sepoy: The Ethnohistory of the Military Labour Market of Hindustan, 1450–1850 (illustrated, reprint, revised ed.). Cambridge, UK: Cambridge University Press. ISBN 978-0521523059. LCCN 89034310. OCLC 717564639.
- Kolff, Dirk H. A. (2022). Frans Naerebout (1748-1818) en het Vlissingen van zijn tijd: Loods en burger van een stad in verval. Zutphen, Netherlands: Uitgeversmaatschappij Walburg Pers. ISBN 978-9462498389.

=== Books edited ===
- Kolff, Dirk H. A.; Gommans, Jos J. L., eds. (2003). Warfare and Weaponry in South Asia 1000–1800 (reprint ed.). New Delhi, India: Oxford University Press. ISBN 978-0195666595. LCCN 00440680. OCLC 469582125.
- Pelsaert, Francisco (1979). Kolff, Dirk H. A.; van Santen, H. W. (eds.). De Geschriften van Francisco Pelsaert over Mughal Indië, 1627: Kroniek en Remonstrantie [The Writings of Francisco Pelsaert Concerning Mughal India, 1627: Chronicle and Remonstrance]. Werken uitgegeven door de Linschoten-Vereeniging, Volume 81 (in Dutch). ’s-Gravenhage, Netherlands: Nijhoff. ISBN 978-9024721733. LCCN 9024721733. OCLC 8298354.

=== Selected papers ===
- Kolff, Dirk H. A. (December 2013). "Peasants Fighting for a Living in Early Modern North India". In Zürcher, Erik-Jan (ed.). Fighting for a Living: A Comparative Study of Military Labour 1500–2000. Work Around the Globe: Historical Comparisons, Volume 1. Amsterdam, Netherlands: Amsterdam University Press. pp. 243–266. doi:10.1515/9789048517251-009.
- Kolff, Dirk H. A. (1998). "A Warlord's Fresh Attempt at Empire". In Alam, Muzaffar; Subrahmanyam, Sanjay (eds.). The Mughal State, 1526–1750 (illustrated, reprint ed.). Delhi, India: Oxford University Press. pp. 75–114. ISBN 978-0195639056. LCCN 98909289. OCLC 40350247.
- Kolff, Dirk H. A. (1992). "Huizinga and the Vedic–Brahmanic Religion: His First Series of Lectures at the University of Amsterdam in 1903–1904". In Heesterman, J. C.; van den Hoek, Albert W.; Kolff, Dirk H. A.; Oort, M. S. (eds.). Ritual, State, and History in South Asia: Essays in Honour of J.C. Heesterman. Memoirs of the Kern Institute, No. 5 (illustrated ed.). Leiden, Netherlands: Brill. pp. 578–586. ISBN 978-9004094673. LCCN 92015094. OCLC 1038452739.
- Kolff, Dirk H. A. (1992). "The Indian and the British Law Machines: Some Remarks on Law and Society in British India". In de Moor, Jaap A.; Mommsen, Wolfgang J. (eds.). European Expansion and Law: The Encounter of European and Indigenous Law in the 19th- and 20th-Century Africa and Asia (illustrated ed.). Oxford, UK: Berg. pp. 201–236. ISBN 978-0854967629. LCCN 91033218. OCLC 851099360.
- Kolff, Dirk H. A. (1989). "The End of an Ancien Régime: Colonial War in India, 1798–1818". In de Moor, Jaap A.; Wesseling, Henk L. (eds.). Imperialism and War: Essays on Colonial Wars in Asia and Africa. Comparative Studies in Overseas History, Volume 8 (illustrated ed.). Leiden, Netherlands: Brill; The Leiden Centre for the History of European Expansion. pp. 22–49. ISBN 978-9004088344. LCCN 88022331. OCLC 1024401882.
- Kolff, Dirk H. A. (March 1988). "Between Empire Building and State Formation. Official Elites in Java and Mughal India". Itinerario. 12 (1, The Ancien Regime in India and Indonesia). Cambridge University Press: 165–194. doi:10.1017/S016511530002341X.
- Kolff, Dirk H. A. (1 June 1971). "Sannyasi Trader–Soldiers". The Indian Economic and Social History Review. 8 (2). SAGE: 213–218. doi:10.1177/001946467100800205. eISSN 0973-0893. ISSN 0019-4646.

== See also ==
- Harald Tambs-Lyche
- Vidya Dhar Mahajan
- Ram Pande
