= Arab ancestry =

Traditional genealogical accounts

Arab ancestry or Arab genealogy refers to the traditional genealogical accounts and the genetic ancestry of peoples identifying as Arabs. In Arab and Islamic tradition, Arab ancestry is commonly expressed through nasab, or genealogy, and is often organized through tribal descent narratives. Modern population genetics examines Arab populations as regionally diverse groups shaped by numerous processes including long-term settlement, migration, admixture, endogamy, and Arabization. Because Arab identity is cultural and historical, genetic studies use the term not to refer to a biological entity but to describe the patterns of descent for the regional populations of the Arab world.

== Traditional accounts ==
=== Nasab and tribal genealogy ===
Arab genealogical tradition is centered on the concept of nasab, which medieval Arabic scholarship often understood as genealogy through the male line, preserved in chains of ancestors and linked into larger tribal genealogies. In literary accounts of pre-Islamic Arabia, genealogy defined individual tribes and also placed them within wider tribal groupings; Quraysh, for example, was represented as a branch within Kinana. These traditions classified populations through presumed eponymous ancestors and larger descent blocs, a pattern that could be applied to settled, semi-nomadic, and nomadic groups alike.

A common scheme emerged within Arabic tradition that divided all earlier Arabs into two groups: southern Arabs and northern Arabs. Southern Arabs were associated with the mythic ancestor Qahtan whose origins are associated with Yemen. Northern Arabs are associated with the ancestor Adnan and descent from Ishmael, one of the sons of Abraham. The tribe of Muhammad, the Quraysh, was traditionally placed as a member of the northern Adnanite lineage, which carried religious, political, and social connotations in Islam.

=== Modern historical interpretation ===
Modern scholarship treats these genealogies as historically important but not as transparent records of descent in the pre-Islamic and prehistoric periods of Arabia Instead, genealogical identity could be socially flexible and evolve over time and they may reflect ethno-historical frameworks that functionally help to organize an individual's identity and the memory of the region but not transparently record the pedigrees of those same groups. Genealogical literature could nevertheless preserve useful historical information: for example one statistical study of an early genealogical work called the Nasab Quraysh (Genealogy of the Quraysh) finds that its marriage data can illuminate the tribal relationships and politics of the Hejaz during the sixth century.

Peter Webb argues that traditional Arab identity was not fixed or inherited in an unchanged way from a timeless pre-Islamic past. Rather, the pre-Islamic past was systematized to create a shared and coherent past for all Arabs during the first centuries of Islam. Webb's work on genealogy among south Arabians has helped show that tribal descent came to primarily reflect a combination of communal status, regional identity, and political claims.

The concept of an Arab (or a'rab) has been shown to exist in pre-Islamic North Arabia from epigraphic discoveries, but the labels themselves do note demonstrate the beliefs in the later universal Arab genealogy, such as a Qahtan-Adnan framework, existed at this time and in the same form. Although the Quran and early Islamic tradition gave an ancestral and cultic role to Abraham and Ishmael, later genealogical literature broadened these into a grand and sacred narrative of Arab ancestry. This has led many historians to distinguishing between Arab labels and social realities in the early period versus sophisticated and ideal, systematic models of the genealogy of the entire Arab peoples.

== Genetic ancestry ==
=== Regional diversity ===
Genetic studies of Arab populations show substantial regional diversity and does not support a single homogeneous Arab ancestry. A 2018 HLA-based meta-analysis of 56 Arab populations found that current Arab groups could be partitioned into several clusters, including North African groups, Levantine and Iraqi-Egyptian groups, Sudanese and Comorian groups, and a separate cluster in the Arabian Peninsula cluster that includes the peoples of Oman, the United Arab Emirates, and Bahrain. Genome-wide studies show that Arabian Peninsula populations are internally structured and have historically been shaped by factors including the geography of the Peninsula, endogamy, trade, and admixture with surrounding regions, including Africa, the Levant, Iran and the Caucasus, and South Asia.

=== Arabian Peninsula ===
Genome-wide studies of the Arabian Peninsula have identified distinctive ancestry among some sampled Arabian populations. A 2016 whole-genome study of Qataris, including Bedouin, found that sampled indigenous genomes indicate an ancient out-of-Africa bottleneck. A broader 2021 study of the Middle East inferred that, after divergence within the region around 15,000-20,000 years ago, Levantine populations expanded while Arabian populations maintained smaller effective population sizes and ancestry related to local hunter-gatherers. The study contrasts Levantine and Arabian populations finding, for example, higher rates of African-related ancestry in the Arabian populations.

Studies of maternal descent also describe the Arabian Peninsula as a region shaped by multiple migration events. A mitochondrial DNA study of 553 Saudi Arabs found substantial African, eastern, and northern Eurasian influences in sampled maternal lineages, estimating that about 20% of those lineages reflected African-related sources, 18% eastern sources, and 62% northern sources. Because mitochondrial DNA tracks only maternal lineages, these estimates do not represent total autosomal ancestry. The study concluded that the Arabian Peninsula had often acted as a recipient of migrations from Africa, India, Indonesia, and western Eurasia rather than an isolated population.

Paternal-line studies often focus on a haplogroup on the Y chromosome called J1-M267, especially its J1-P58 branch. This branch is seen frequently in parts of Arabia, Southern Mesopotamia, and the Southern Levant. However, J1-M267 is thousands of years old and its deep history is likely to be involved with West Asian demographic processes rather than with any single medieval Arab lineage.

=== North Africa and the Levant ===
Outside the Arabian Peninsula, the ancestry of Arab populations reflects both migration from Arabia and the Arabization of local peoples. Studies of North Africa describe Arab-Islamic and later tribal movements into the Maghreb, including movements such as those of Banu Hilal and Banu Sulaym, but North African population history also includes deep local Maghrebi ancestry, Near Eastern-related ancestry, sub-Saharan African ancestry, and region-specific histories.

In the Levant, genome-wide studies have found population structure shaped by religion, culture, and historical endogamy. Differing patterns of relatedness are exhibited by the different religious groups in the region, including Muslims, Christians, Jews, and Druze. Ancient DNA from Bronze Age Sidon, in modern-day Lebanon, has been interpreted as evidence for substantial continuity between Bronze Age Canaanite-related populations and present-day Lebanese people, with Eurasian ancestry being introduced in later periods.

=== Ancient DNA ===
While it is limited, there is an expanding dataset of Ancient DNA from Arabia that is enabling the history of the region to be understood through paleogenetics. For example, ancient genomes have been sequenced from the Tylos period of Bahrain and this has shown that pre-Islamic Eastern Arabian populations have ancestry related to Anatolia, the Levant, and the Iran and Caucasus area. Medieval genomes from Socotra show links to coastal South Arabia, especially Hadramawt, along with relative isolation across many centuries.
