= Sadaat-e-Bara =

Community of Sayyids

Sadaat-e-Bara or Sadaat Bahera
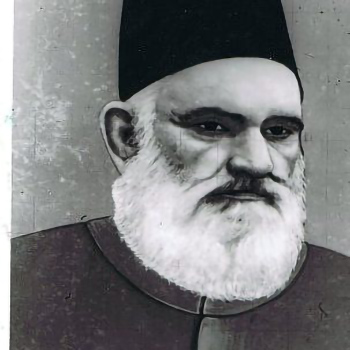
- Mohsin-ul-Mulk, a member of the Sadaat-e-Bara

Regions with significant populations
- • India • Pakistan

Languages
- • Urdu • Hindi • Awadhi

Religion
- Shia Islam

Related ethnic groups
- • Sayyid • Urdu-speaking people • Arab • Sayyid of Uttar Pradesh• Sadaat Amroha• Gardezi Sadaat • Sadaat-e-Sirsi * Sadaat-e-Bilgram • Sadaat-e-Saithal • Hyderabadi Saadatiyon (Asaf Jahi, Salarjung, Paigah intermixing * )

Sadat e-Bara sometimes pronounced Sadaat-e-Bahara, are a tribe of Indian Muslim Sayyids, originally elite or noble Sayyid families situated in the present-day Muzaffarnagar district of Uttar Pradesh in India.

This community had considerable influence during the early 18th century Mughal Empire. Its members were also found in Hyderabad, Karnal District and Haryana, Gujarat & Karnataka, Maharashtra state in India. Some of the members of this community have migrated to Pakistan after independence and have settled in Karachi, Khairpur State in Sindh and Lahore and Chiniot.

== History ==
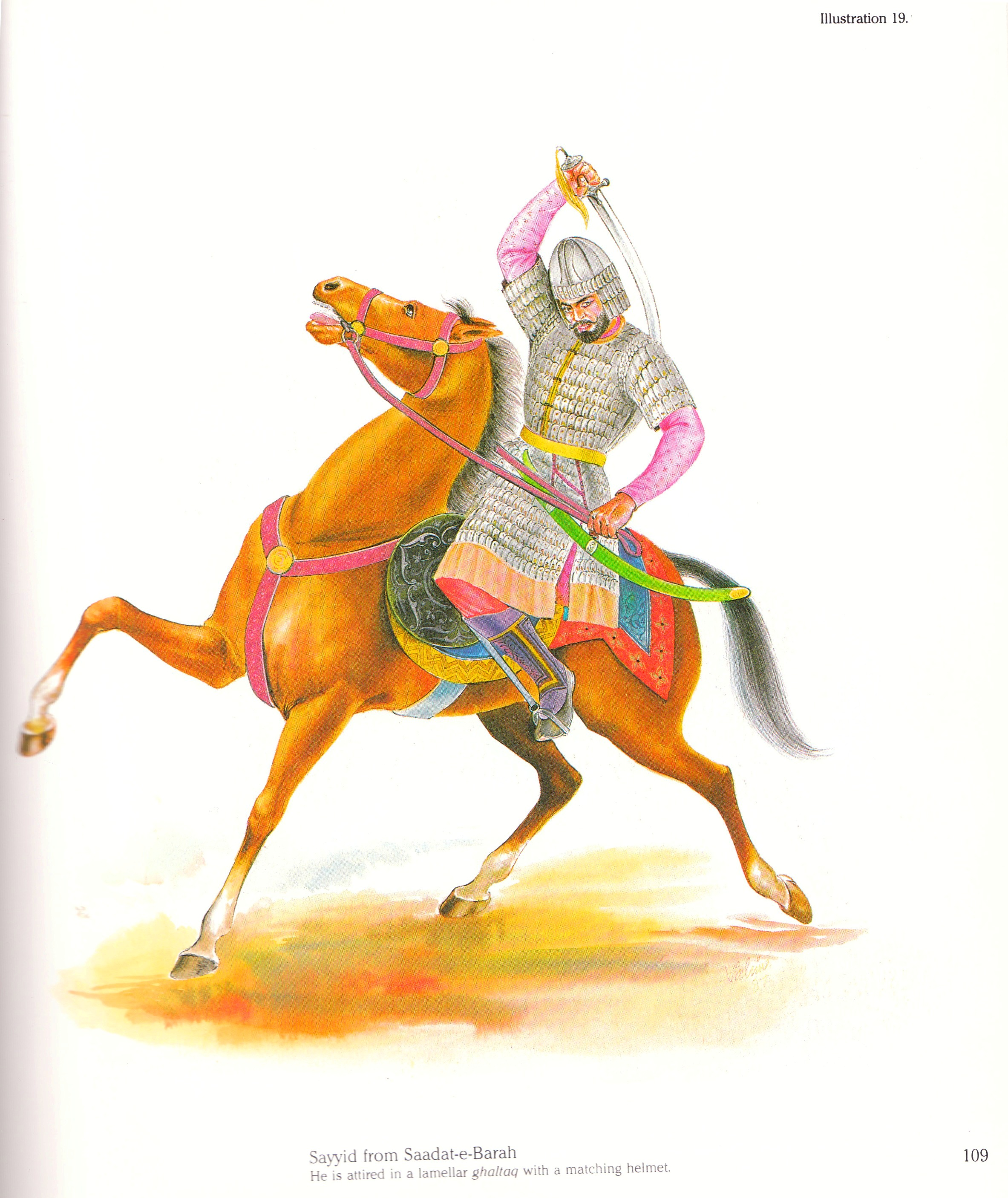
A cavalryman of the Saadat-e Barah.

According to the consensus of all family traditions, the ancestor of the Sadaat-e-Bara, Sayyid Abu Farah al-Husayni al-Wasiti, who was a 15th generation descendant of Zaid ibn Ali, left his original home in Wasit, Iraq, during the reign of Mahmud of Ghazni. He traveled first to Ghazni and subsequently to Punjab. Although he eventually returned to Ghazni himself, four of his sons, namely Abul Fazl, Najmuddin, Daood, and Abul Araash, settled in four villages in Punjab: Chathrodi, Tihaanupuri, Kundliwal, and Jajneri, respectively.

Their lineage has always remained contested. Contemporary scholars Dirk H.A. Kolff and Richard M. Eaton considered them to be as native as the Jats, Rajputs, and Marathas, who migrated to Muzaffarnagar at an uncertain time, attributing their origins to India due to the rustic and non-Persian culture of the Barhas. At the same time, rigorous Islamic genealogists and scholars of Ilm al Ansaab such as the Qamar Abbas Araji al-Hamdani and Zafaryab Tirmizi al-Hussaini accepted their Sayyid genealogy without contest in their respective books, Mudrik ut-Talib fi Ansaab-e-Aale Abi Talib and Tareekh-e-Anwaar-e-Sadaat.

=== Role in the Mughal empire ===
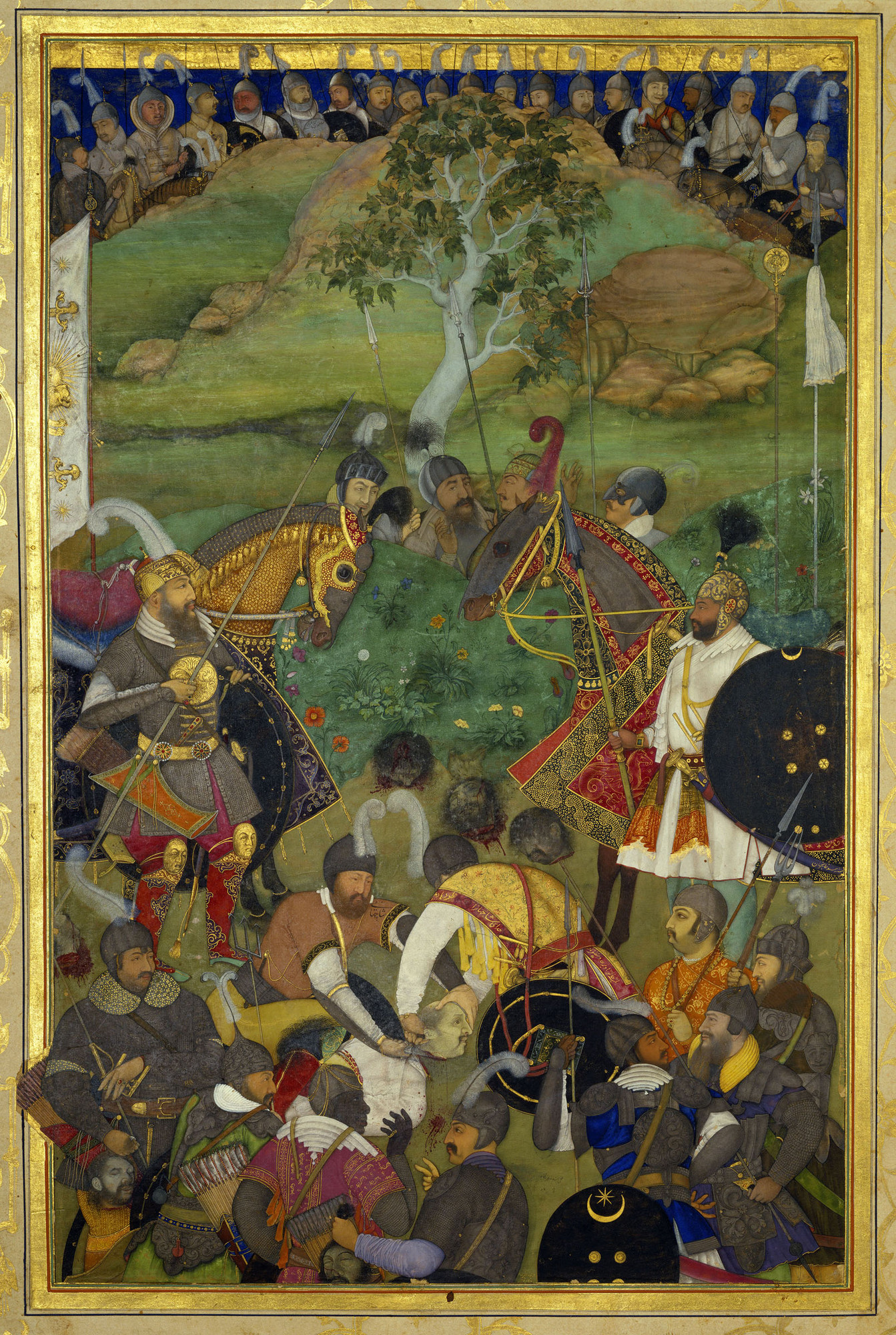
The Decapitation of Khan Jahan Lodi (3 February 1631), with Syed Mian Barha on the right and Khan-i Jahan Muzaffar Khan Barha on the left

The Barha Sayyid tribe was famous throughout the country for its obstinate valour and love of fight, as well as religious fervour. The tribe traditionally composed the vanguard of the imperial army, which they alone held the hereditary right to lead in every battle.

==== Conquest of Gujarat (1572–1573) ====
Akbar’s conquest of Gujarat targeted the weakened Gujarat Sultanate under Muzaffar Shah III to secure its ports and agricultural wealth. The Akbarnama highlights Sayyid Mahmud Khan Barha, a Barha Sayyid, who served as a commander during the siege of Surat in 1573. He led Mughal forces against the rebellious Mirzas (Muhammad Husain Mirza and Shah Mirza), securing a decisive victory. Sayyid Ahmad Barha also played a key role in the siege of Patan (January 1573), supporting Khan A‘zam against the Mirzas and Sher Khan Fuladi, repelling the besiegers and consolidating Mughal control.

==== Conquest of Malwa (1561–1562) ====
The conquest of Malwa aimed to defeat the Afghan ruler Baz Bahadur. The Akbarnama records Sayyid Mahmud Khan Barha’s participation under Adham Khan in the Battle of Sarangpur (1561), where Baz Bahadur was routed. The campaign was marred by Adham Khan’s slaughter of Muslim theologians and Sayyids, highlighting their dual role as commanders and victims.

==== Conquest of Rajasthan: Chittor (1567–1568) and Ranthambore (1569) ====
Akbar’s campaigns against Rajput rulers, notably in Chittor and Ranthambore, were central to his Rajput policy. Sayyid Muhammad Khan aided in breaching Chittor’s defenses against Jaimal Rathore and Patta Singh Sisodia. Sayyid Qasim Barha supported the Ranthambore siege, facilitating Rao Surjan Hada’s surrender. The Akbarnama notes Sayyid Muhammad Khan’s role in the siege of Chittor (1567–1568), where he served as a commander under Akbar, contributing to the defeat of Jaimal Rathore. Sayyid Qasim Barha participated in the Ranthambore campaign (1569), aiding the siege against Rao Surjan Hada, which led to the fort’s surrender.

==== Campaigns against Afghan rebels ====
Afghan rebellions in eastern India challenged Akbar’s authority. The Akbarnama records Sayyid Ahmad Khan’s efforts in Jaunpur and Bihar during the 1560s, suppressing rebels like Khan Zaman (Ali Quli Khan). Sayyid Abdullah Khan fought against Daud Khan Karrani in Bengal, contributing to his defeat in 1576.

=== Aurangzeb era onward ===
By the time of Emperor Aurangzeb in the 17th century, the dynasty was firmly regarded as "Old Nobility" and held prestigious Subahs (provinces) such as Ajmer and the Deccan (Dakhin). They formed a Hindustani faction of Mughal nobility as opposed to the Turko-Persian Turani in the late Mughal period.

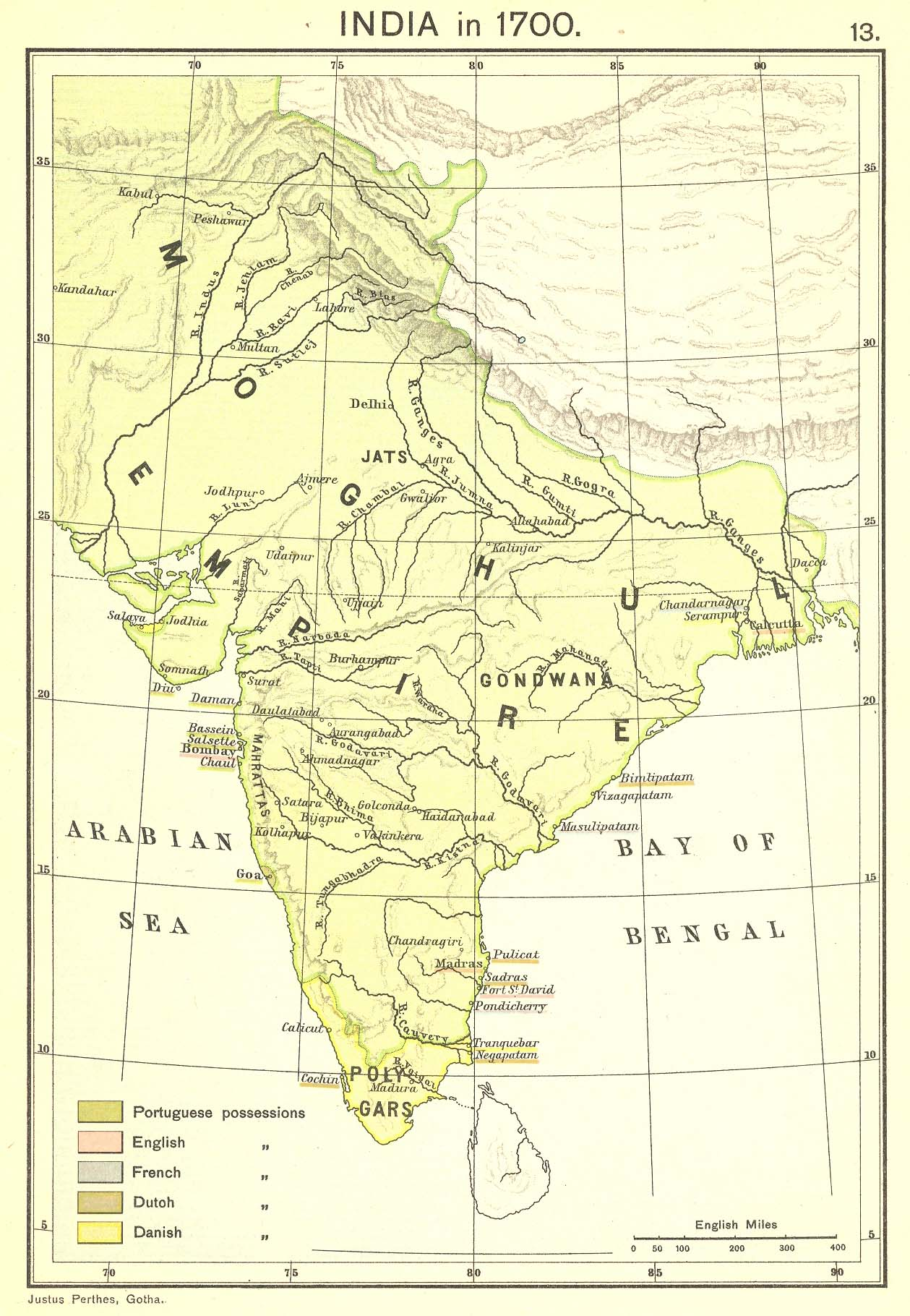
The Sayyid Brothers were de-facto rulers of the Mughal Empire in the 1710s

Aurangzeb's warning to his sons to be cautious in dealing with the Sayyids of Barha, "...because a strong partner in government soon wants to seize the kingship for himself", would eventually become true.

Six years after the death of Aurangzeb, the Barhas became kingmakers in the Mughal empire under Qutub-ul-Mulk and Ihtisham-ul-Mulk, creating and deposing Mughal emperors at will.

=== After the Mughal empire ===
The Barha Sayyids regained many of their estates from the Marathas and regained their status in the parganah by the time of British arrival.

== See also ==
- Sadaat
- Barha dynasty
- Ashrafization
