= Jansath =

- Location within Uttar Pradesh
- Coordinates: 29.33°N 77.85°E
- Country: India
- State: Uttar Pradesh
- District: Muzaffarnagar

Government
  - Body: Nagar Panchayat
- Elevation: 232 m (761 ft)

Population (2001)
  - Total: 17,782

Languages
  - Official: Hindi
- Time zone: UTC+5:30 (IST)
- Postal code: 251314
- Vehicle registration: UP12
- Website: https://www.apnajansath.com

Jansath is a town and a nagar panchayat in Muzaffarnagar district in the Indian state of Uttar Pradesh.

== Geography ==
Jansath is located at 29.33°N 77.85°E. It has an average elevation of 232 metres (761 feet).

== Demographics ==
As of 2001 India census, Jansath had a population of 17,782. Males constitute 53% of the population and females 47%. Jansath has an average literacy rate of 55%, lower than the national average of 65.38. Male literacy is 64%, and female literacy is 45%. In Jansath, 18% of the population is under 6 years of age. There are two major religions: Hindu and Islam.

== History ==
Jansath is a small town in western Uttar Pradesh, the north-western part of India, about 118 km from the National Capital of Delhi.

This is a historical town and many stories are linked to it since the time of Mahabharat. An old temple, where the Kauravas and Pandvas played dice and lost their kingdom, is on the southern outskirts of Jansath and is known as "Mahadev ka Mandir".

The area has one of the largest concentrations of Sayyids in India. The upper Doab was controlled by the Sayyids of Barha. The influential Sayyid brothers, Sayyid Hassan Ali Khan and Sayyid Hussain Ali Khan, controlled the Mughal emperors from 1713 to 1720 are from Jansath. At the time Muzaffarnagar was part of the Barah country as it was intimately connected with the Barah Sayyids, who became de-facto rulers of the Mughal empire in the 1710s. The Indian Muslim inhabitants of Jansath were heavily recruited in the Mughal army since the time of Akbar, and the personal armies of the Sayyid Brothers recruited only Indian Muslims from Barha.

The Sayyid Brothers were killed through a conspiracy by Mughal Emperor Muhammad Shah with the help of Asaf Jah I, who later became the first Nizam of Hyderabad. In 1722, after the poisoning of Hassan Ali Khan, orders were given to lay waste to the Barah country but the Sayyid tribesmen offered stubborn resistance and "broke the teeth of the Mughals".

In 1737, Jansath was attacked by the Mughal government. The Wazir Qamruddin Khan had been alarmed at their reputation, seeing that "the snake was scotched and not killed". Sayyid Saifuddin Ali Khan, the younger brother of the two former king-makers, Qutb-ul-Mulk and Ihtisham-ul-Mulk, had been residing in Jansath in retirement after the death of the brothers. The Wazir was determined to provoke the Sayyids into some form of rebellion so as to give him the colour to the action he intended to take. For this purpose, he dispatched Marhamat Khan to the Saharanpur district, resuming the jagir of the Barha Sayyids. Marhamat Khan was a man of course and brutal manners, and used unnecessary violence and cruelty, that the Sayyids rose en-masse and put Marhamat Khan and his followers to death. The Wazir was delighted at this opportunity, and raised an army to sack Jansath. A number of 3300 Sayyids faced more than 30,000 Mughal troops, where Saifuddin Khan was killed. Sayyid Saifuddin Ali Khan was buried in Jansath near Karbala.

Jansath has several old monuments including the house of Sayyid brothers which is called "Rang Mahal". The entrance is called "Bada Darwaza". Rang Mahal is under the care of the descendants of Sayyid Brothers. Jansath has several other old monuments like Sheesh Mahal, Rang Mahal, Moti Mahal, Badi and Choti Haveli in Jannatabad & Mahadev Mandir.

Khan Bahadur Syed Muzaffar Ali Khan, the author of the book "Tareeq E Sadaat Barha" was from Jansath. He was the founder & the first Chairman of the Shia Conference.

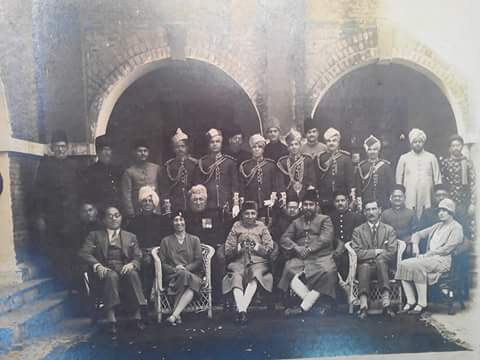
Khan Bahadur Abdullah Khan of Jansath with Liaqat Ali Khan the Nawab of Karnal (later Pakistani Prime Minister)

The other well known figure from Jansath is Moraad Ali Khan, who won a Gold Medal in Double trap shooting at the Commonwealth Games in Manchester in 2002. He also won a Gold Medal in the Asian Championship in Chengdu, China in 1995. He won several other medals in international championships and was also 7 times National Champion. He was given the Arjun Award in 1998.
