= Daud Khan Panni =

Mughal noble and military commander

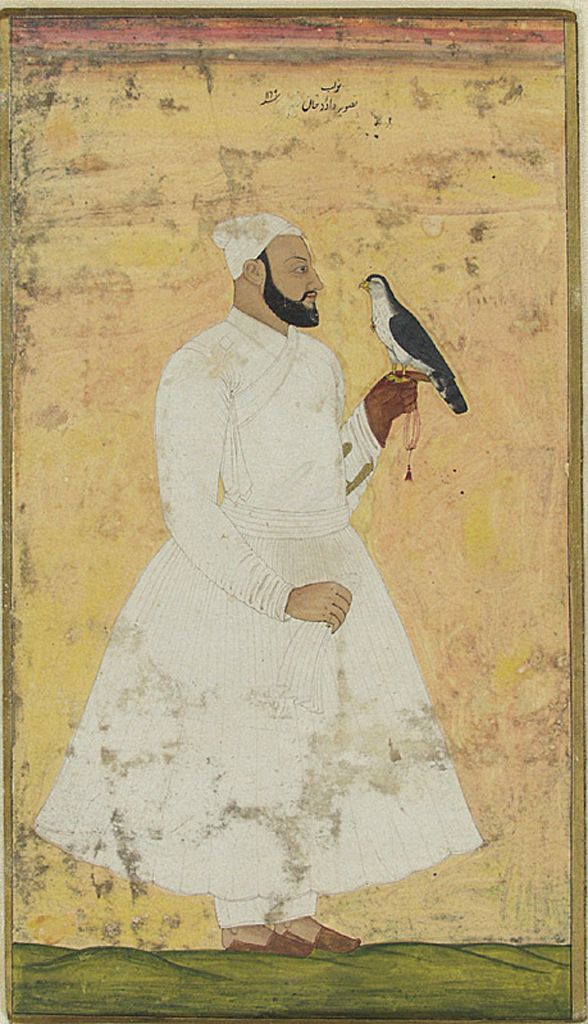
- Portrait of Nawab Daud Khan, Mughal India, portrayed in Hyderabad, Deccan, India (1756)

Naib Faujdar of the Carnatic
- In office 1701–?
- Monarch: Aurangzeb

Naib Subahdar of the Deccan
- In office 1710–1713
- Monarchs: Bahadur Shah I, Jahandar Shah

Subahdar of Gujarat
- In office 1713–1715
- Monarch: Farrukhsiyar
- Preceded by: Shahamat Khan
- Succeeded by: Ajit Singh

Personal details
- Died: 6 September 1715 near Burhanpur
- Relations: A daughter of Jaswantsinghji of Dhrangadhra (wife); Ranmast Khan (paternal uncle); Sulaiman Khan (brother); Ibrahim Khan (brother)
- Parent: Khizr Khan Panni (father)

Military service
- Battles/wars: Siege of Jinji Siege of Wagingera Mughal war of succession (1707–1709)

Daud Khan Panni (d. 6 September 1715) or simply Daud Khan, was a Pashtun nobleman and military commander of the Mughal Empire. Historians Muzaffar Alam and Sanjay Subrahmanyam characterise him as an important figure of Mughal history spanning the later years of emperor Aurangzeb, to the early rule of Farrukhsiyar.

As the deputy of distinguished official Zulfiqar Khan, Daud Khan Panni was prominently associated with Mughal interests in South India. He was particularly influential in the politics of the Carnatic region, which he governed in the early 1700s. Later in life, he was appointed governor of Gujarat under emperor Farrukhsiyar, serving briefly before his death in a battle against Sayyid Hussain Ali Khan. He is regarded to have played a significant role in the establishment of the Nawab of the Carnatic.

== Origins ==
Daud Khan's father was Khizr Khan Panni, an Afghan. Originally a merchant, he entered the service of the Bijapur Sultanate in 1665 and rose through its ranks. Khizr Khan was assassinated in 1676/1677 due to court intrigues that sprung in the aftermath of Ali Adil Shah II's death. Daud Khan had a paternal uncle named Ranmast Khan (born Shaikh Ali), an officer who defected from Bijapur to the Mughals in 1665. Sulaiman Khan and Ibrahim Khan were two brothers of Daud Khan.

== Career ==
=== Early career and faujdar of the Carnatic ===
Daud Khan entered the Mughal service in 1676/1677, shortly after the assassination of his father. This was the result of a Mughal-Bijapur battle centred on Naldurg Fort. Daud Khan and his brothers were stuck in this strategic fort through the course of the battle. Their initial loyalties are unclear, but Daud Khan and his siblings handed over the fort to the Mughals in exchange for a high appointment in the Mughal service. This was facilitated by their uncle Ranmast Khan, who was a member of the Mughal forces. Daud Khan was given a mansab (rank) of 4000, as well as a jagir in Tembhurni.

Daud Khan would then serve under Ranmast Khan, who went on to achieve fame as a Mughal officer. In 1682, Daud Khan, Ranmast Khan, and brother Sulaiman Khan received khilat (robes of honour) from emperor Aurangzeb in the Deccan. Ranmast Khan died in 1691 leading a battle at Wagingera; resultantly, Daud Khan and his family received some of his land-holdings, as well as increases in rank.

Later, Daud Khan Panni was attached to the retinue of Mughal general and nobleman Zulfiqar Khan. He rose to become his patron's immediate deputy, and accompanied him on his Deccan campaigns. He is known to have participated in the Siege of Jinji. When Zulfiqar Khan won this battle in 1698 and conquered Jinji Fort, he was recalled to the emperor's camp in northern India. Since Zulfiqar Khan was the faujdar (military commander) of the Carnatic, in his absence Daud Khan was appointed naib (deputy) faujdar of the Hyderabad-Carnatic. In 1701, he was also given the same command of the Bijapur-Carnatic, making him the effective administrator of the entire Carnatic region. He took up residence in Arcot following this promotion, which served as his base of operations.

Between 1701-1704, Daud Khan led several successful campaigns against local paligars and rajas in the Carnatic, such as the Tanjore Maratha king, in order to impose Mughal authority and extract tribute. Around this period, Daud Khan also placed pressure on European presences in the region. On several occasions, he threatened the East India Company settlement of Madras, even besieging it in 1702 and extracting significant tribute. He returned to pressure Madras in 1706. Similarly in 1704, he objected to the erection of fortifications at the French town of Pondicherry, on the grounds that it was under Mughal jurisdiction, and in 1706 he threatened to march on the town - this prompted the governor to present him a sum of 10,000 rupees. On the other hand, in 1701 he invited the Dutch East India Company to occupy the abandoned port of Kunjimedu.

During his visits to pressure Madras, Daud Khan resided in the Portuguese town of São Tomé, where he built a residence and established local connections. He is also known to have harboured plans to fortify and develop the town, though these never came to fruition.

In 1704, emperor Aurangzeb additionally assigned him to the deputy governorship of Hyderabad Subah (under the absentee governor prince Kam Bakhsh), replacing Rustam Dil Khan, in order to combat rising Maratha insurgency in the region. His mansab was raised to 6000. Daud Khan was not happy with this assignment due to existing pressures from administering the Carnatic, and occupied the office for only a year before being called to serve the emperor in the Siege of Wagingera. In the year 1705, Rustam Dil Khan officially took back this post.

=== Post-Aurangzeb era ===
The death of Aurangzeb in 1707 spawned a succession struggle, causing Daud Khan to leave the Carnatic for northern India. Along with Zulfiqar Khan, he allied with prince Azam Shah for the succession. Though Azam Shah was defeated, Daud Khan and Zulfiqar Khan continued to have successful careers under the victorious Bahadur Shah. Daud Khan played an important role in consolidating Bahadur Shah's kingship in 1709. That year, Bahadur Shah marched on his brother Kam Bakhsh, who claimed independent rule in the Deccan. Daud Khan and his subordinates brought the battle to a close when they captured the wounded Kam Bakhsh, by encircling him and his elephant.

Following Kam Bakhsh's defeat and death, the governorship of the Deccan was given to Zulfiqar Khan. Daud Khan consequently served as naib subahdar (deputy governor) from 1710. His mansab was raised to 7000. He was also made governor of the provinces Berar, Bijapur, and Aurangabad. With his appointment to the Deccan provinces, Daud Khan's activities shifted away from the Carnatic. During this time, the Mughal Deccan faced significant raids from Maratha armies, which Daud Khan combated to limited success. This caused Daud Khan to negotiate a pact with the Maratha ruler Shahuji, granting the latter the right to collect chauth and sardeshmukhi (Maratha taxes) in return for restoration of order. This was a definitive departure from the policies of Aurangzeb, and a handover of 35% of the Deccan's revenue. Historian Satish Chandra suggests that this pact had tacit imperial approval. Daud Khan continued to hold his deputy governorship during the brief reign of Bahadur Shah's successor, Jahandar Shah.

In 1713, Farrukhsiyar ascended the Mughal throne, and Zulfiqar Khan was killed. Daud Khan was transferred the same year to the governorship of Gujarat. During his tenure, the provincial capital Ahmedabad saw a severe riot (dated 1714) involving the festival of Holi. Daud Khan sent troops to subdue it, and though the perpetrators were successfully imprisoned, they were later released by oppositional factions of the imperial court. In 1715, Farrukhsiyar appointed Sayyid Hussain Ali Khan, one of the Sayyid brothers and an integral power-broker of Delhi, to the governorship of the Deccan as a means of distancing him from court politics. Farrukhsiyar transferred Daud Khan to the governorship of Burhanpur province (Khandesh Subah) on 3 May 1715, and secretly instructed him to resist Hussain Ali Khan, offering the governorship of the Deccan as a reward if the latter was killed. The two confronted each other in battle near Burhanpur, with Husain Ali Khan's forces outnumbering those of Daud Khan. Daud Khan Panni was killed by a bullet on 6 September 1715. His body was paraded on an elephant.

== Personal life ==
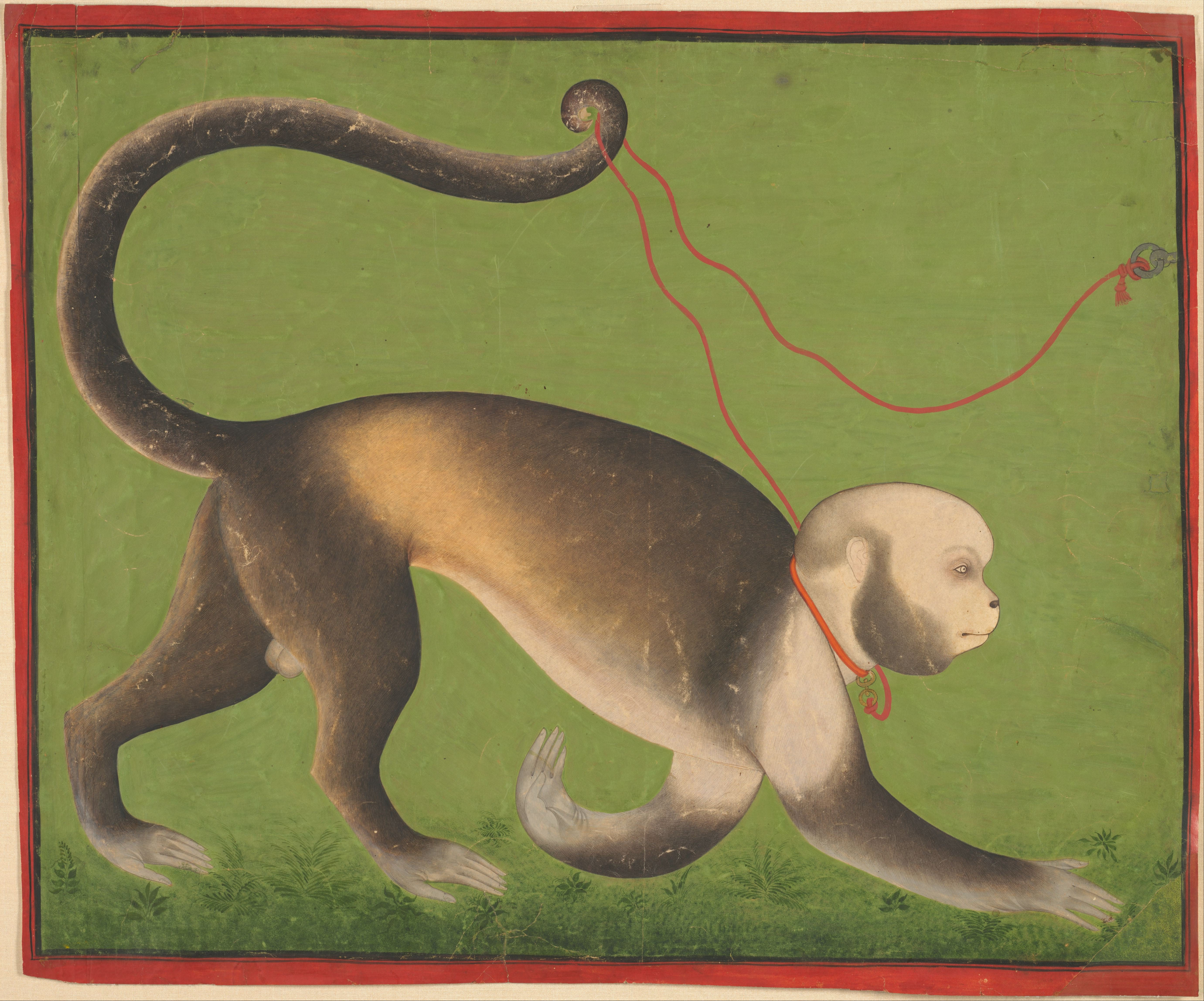
Portrait of Daud Khan's pet monkey, c. 1705, Art Institute of Chicago

Daud Khan Panni was childless, which was the subject of gossip in contemporary chronicles. The traveller Manucci recorded stories of Daud Khan immediately killing newborns that his wives/concubines birthed, though some scholars have dismissed this as rumor. He is known to have married his cousin, a daughter of Ranmast Khan, but she became estranged from him. Daud also married a daughter of Rawal Jaswantsinghji of Dhrangadhra in 1714-15 during his governorship in Gujarat.

Daud Khan harboured a notable interest in animals. He maintained a mobile animal establishment termed a shikarkhana, which consisted of numerous species of wildlife. He is also known to have procured a rare kind of monkey from a Dutch Jew, and when the monkey later died, he punished its caretakers severely.

== Legacy ==
Daud Khan's tenure in the Carnatic resulted in the establishment of a Mughal administration in the area. When his political activities shifted away from the region, this left a leading subordinate, the diwan Saadatullah Khan, to assert greater control. He established an autonomous ruling dynasty in the wake of the declining Mughal Empire, becoming the first Nawab of the Carnatic. This dynasty contributed to the development of British power in India.

== Bibliography ==
- Archambault, Hannah (2018). Geographies of Influence: Two Afghan Military Households in 17th and 18th Century South India (Thesis). UC Berkeley.
- Chandra, Satish (2002). Parties and politics at the Mughal Court, 1707-1740 (4th ed.). New Delhi: Oxford University Press. ISBN 0-19-565444-7. OCLC 50004530.
- Alam, Muzaffar; Subrahmanyam, Sanjay (2011). "Trade and Politics in the Arcot Nizāmat (1700–1732)". Writing the Mughal World. Columbia University Press. pp. 339–395. doi:10.7312/alam15810-010. ISBN 9780231527903.
- Watson, John W. (1889). Gazetteer of the Bombay Presidency. Vol. VIII: Kathiawar. Bombay: Government Central Press.
