= Siege of Jinji =

1690–1698 siege

- Part of Deccan wars
Date	October 1690 – 8 January 1698
Location	Jinji Fort (present-day Tamil Nadu, India)
Result	Mughal victory

Commanders and leaders
Zulfiqar Khan; Kam Bakhsh; Asad Khan; Daud Khan Panni; Dalpat Rao Bundela	Rajaram I; Dhanaji Jadhav; Santaji Ghorpade

Strength
26,000	7,000–8000 (garrison); 10,000–30,000 (reinforcements)

The siege of Jinji (1690–1698) was a protracted conflict between the Mughal Empire and the Maratha kingdom, wherein the triple-hill fortress of Jinji (in modern-day Tamil Nadu, India) was besieged by a large Mughal force in order to capture the embedded Maratha king Rajaram I. Led by Mughal general Zulfiqar Khan under the orders of Mughal emperor Aurangzeb, the siege was the focal point of the Mughal-Maratha wars during this decade; lasting almost eight years, it represented the lengthiest of any siege mounted in Mughal history. The strength of the hill-fort, constant disruption of Mughal supply lines by Maratha forces, and dissent within Mughal ranks contributed to the length of the siege. Though the fortress finally capitulated, Rajaram evaded capture, establishing himself instead at the hill-fort of Satara. The conquest of Jinji gave the Mughals control over the south-eastern Coromandel districts.

== Background ==
=== Political landscape ===
The ongoing war between the Mughals and Marathas reached an inflection point in the late 1680s. Mughal forces captured the Maratha king Sambhaji in February 1689 while he was en route from Panhala to the Maratha capital Raigad. He was brought to Mughal emperor Aurangzeb's imperial camp and executed. Sambhaji's younger brother Rajaram was hastily crowned at Raigad. Raigad was besieged and captured in 1689 by Mughal general Zulfiqar Khan, son of Aurangzeb's wazir (chief minister), but Rajaram fled to the extreme south in the guise of a yogi, with the help of Maratha chieftains Dhanaji Jadhav and Santaji Ghorpade. He found refuge in Jinji fortress, controlled by his half-brother the Raja of Thanjavur. Here he was crowned and set up court with nobles that had accompanied him.

By this point, the Mughals had annexed most of the Maratha kingdom and seized its treasure, and the Maratha state seemed to be deteriorating. In addition, earlier that same decade the Mughals had annexed the last remaining Deccan sultanates, the Bijapur and Golconda sultanates, adding vast tracts of land, resources, and treasure to the Mughal polity. At this point it seemed to many in the Mughal administration that Mughal authority in the Deccan had been consolidated. However, Maratha chiefs continued to harass Mughal holdings in the north, making it difficult for Mughal governors to protect their districts and collect taxes. Instead of concluding the empire's Deccan conquests, Aurangzeb chose to launch a campaign against Rajaram, both in order to quell the rebellions of Maratha chiefs definitively, as well as to annex the Carnatic region.

=== Jinji ===
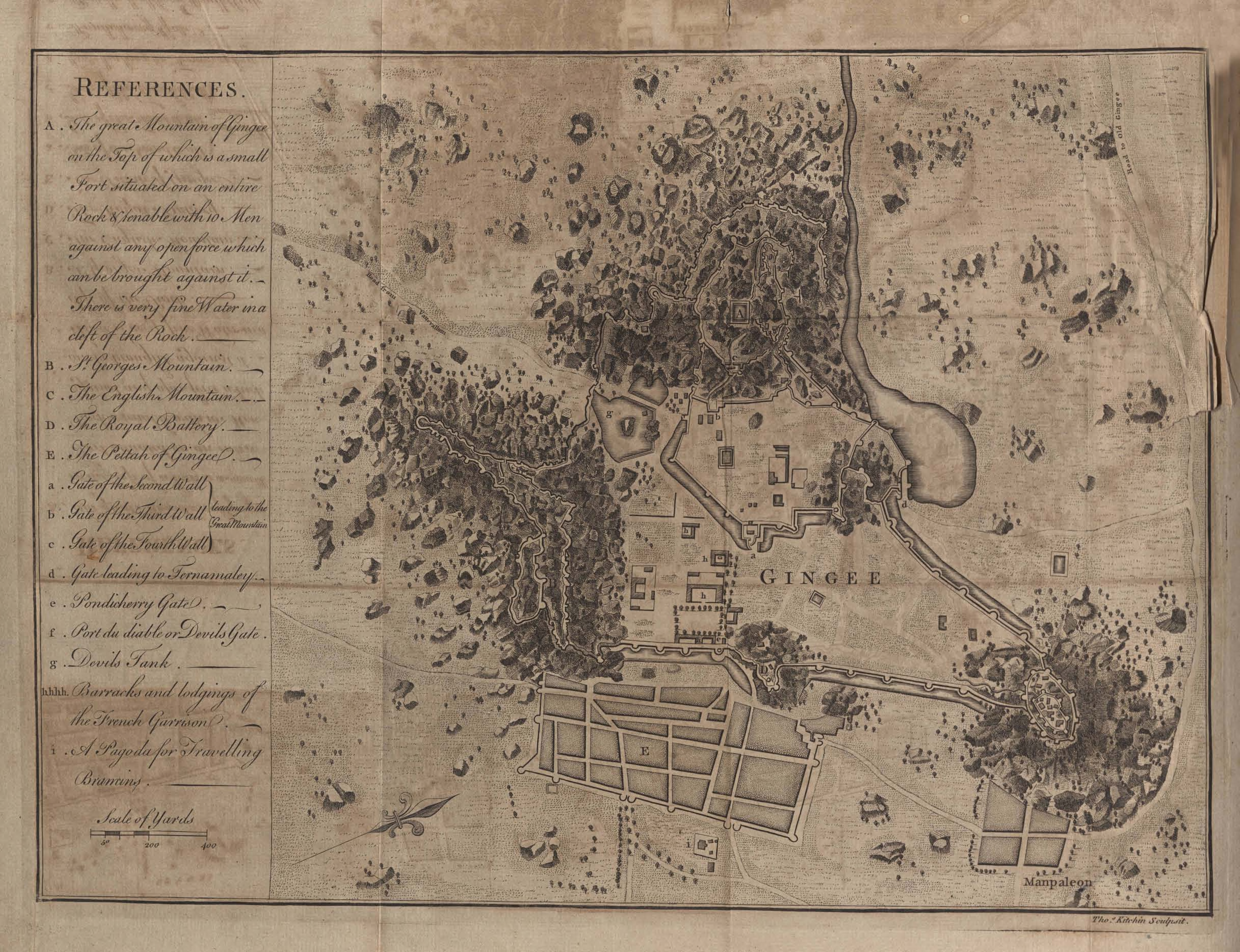
Contemporary map of Jinji, from the 18th-century work A History of the Military Transactions of the British Nation in Indostan

The fortress of Jinji lay between Arcot and Tiruchirappalli. It was notable for its size, impregnability, and domineering position. The fortress formed a triangle out of three hills, each hosting a rock fort. Each of these three forts was made up of granite walls measuring nearly 5 kilometres (3.1 mi) in circumference and at heights of 50-150 metres. The entire fortress of Jinji was also surrounded by mountains, making it difficult to reach for any army. In addition to its impregnability, the fortress was also well-supplied; it contained several granaries, two steady springs of freshwater, and three reservoirs. Therefore, the fortress of Jinji was well-suited to withstand a lengthy siege. It was originally a notable political centre in the 15th and the 16th centuries when it was occupied by Telugu Nayakas, drawing the attention of European observers for its immense size and strength. In 1649, the fortress was taken by the Sultanate of Bijapur and was subsequently captured by Maratha ruler Shivaji I around 1677. It remained under the control of the Bhonsle dynasty when Rajaram arrived there seeking refuge.

== Siege ==
=== Preparations ===
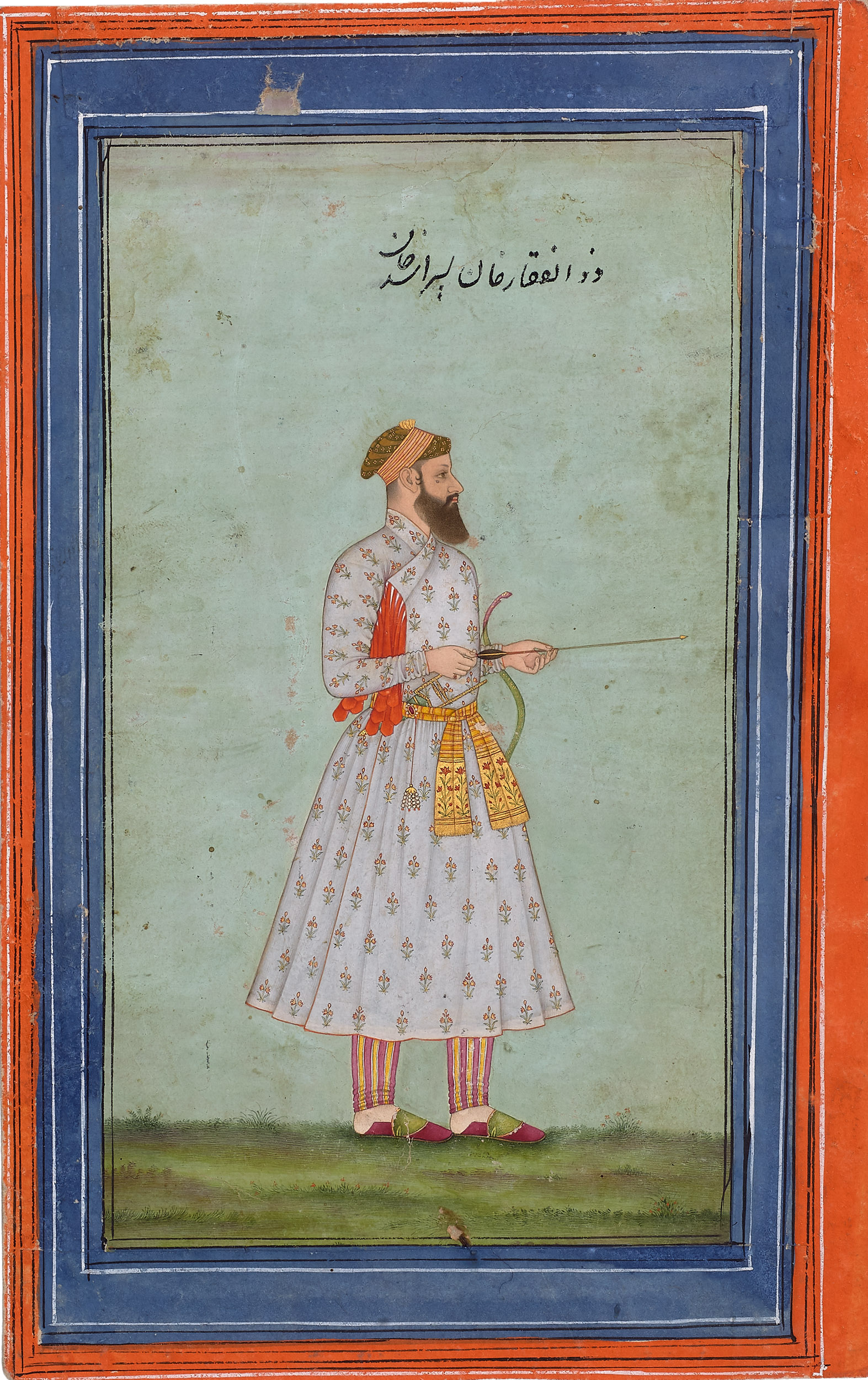
Zulfiqar Khan, commander of the siege over the course of nine years

Aurangzeb gave the command of a large army to Zulfiqar Khan, dispatching him to Jinji. As the army marched south, the emperor via correspondence with Zulfiqar Khan and Ali Mardan Khan (faujdar of the Carnatic), came to an agreement around November to finance this massive army from land revenues derived from a mix of sources; land formerly used by the Golconda Sultanate to support their armies, land held by Zulfiqar Khan, and lands detached from the Mughal khalisa (crown lands). The imperial wazir and Zulfiqar Khan's father, Asad Khan, took control of the towns Cuddapah and Kurnool in order to secure supply lines from the north. A supply line was established stretching from the emperor's camp in Galgali which was 55 kilometres (34 mi) southwest of Bijapur, through the base of Cuddapah, to the siege camp at Jinji. Ali Mardan Khan was also tasked with directing funds and supplies from the north to the army via Kanchipuram.

The siege army arrived at Jinji around October 1690. According to European sources, the force numbered around 26,000, consisting of 10,000 Mughal cavalry, 8,000 Bundela musketeers, and 8,000 local soldiers from the Carnatic. Additionally present for support were around 100 elephants as well as 2,000–4,000 camels for carrying supplies. The army was equipped with around 130 cannons. 500 maunds of gunpowder were purchased from the British at Fort St. George. Zulfiqar Khan would remain the main commander through the course of the siege. His chief officers mainly consisted of Irani and Afghan commanders that had previously served the Deccan Sultanates (for example Daud Khan Panni) as well as some Hindus, Marathas, and Deccanis. The Maratha garrison at Jinji numbered 7,000-8,000 troops.

=== Phase I ===
Mughal forces had encircled the fortress by the first year of the siege, but not effectively due to its immense size. Rajaram had the support of his relative the Raja of Thanjavur, and Maratha reinforcements regularly harassed the Mughal siege forces, enabling provisions to be brought to the fortress. After the completion of a year of the siege (around 1692), Aurangzeb appointed the Mughal prince Kam Bakhsh as supreme commander of the siege, sending him with a large army and Asad Khan, wazir of the empire and father of Zulfiqar Khan. The arrival of these Mughal reinforcements did not improve the Mughal position. At the close of the second year of the siege, Maratha generals Dhanaji and Santaji arrived with a force of 30000, cutting off the Mughal siege army's supply lines completely, isolating them. This practice would repeat itself over the year 1693, as Rajaram managed to recruit more Maratha forces. This kept the Mughal forces cut off from communication and led Zulfiqar Khan to perform raids and excursions on neighbouring kingdoms to collect tribute. The Mughal army had also damaged their artillery through overcharging of volleys, rendering the besiegers to be the besieged. Dhanaji and Santaji also captured the Mughal faujdar Ali Mardan Khan, leading to an administrative shift where Zulfiqar Khan was made the administrator of the Carnatic in addition to his responsibility as war general.

The isolation of the Mughal forces at Jinji led to the proliferation of rumours among camp that the aging emperor Aurangzeb had died. This encouraged prince Kam Bakhsh to enter into peace negotiations with Rajaram in the spring of 1693. He also made plans to take over the imperial army for a potential war of succession. Upon discovery by Zulfiqar Khan and Asad Khan, who were already backfoot on the siege lines, they readily arrested the prince. They retreated to the Mughal base at Wandiwash, 50 kilometres (31 mi) north of Jinji. Thereafter Asad Khan took Kam Bakhsh to the imperial camp, where the emperor pardoned Kam Bakhsh, treating him with relative leniency. However, Kam Bakhsh would never be deployed in the field again, making Jinji his first and last stint in a commanding military role. Historian Munis Faruqui highlights the arrest as a violent example of the nobility's loyalty to Aurangzeb clashing with the interests of the princes.

=== Phase II ===
For the next four years of the campaign, Zulfiqar Khan used Wandiwash as a base to consolidate Mughal authority in the environs of Jinji. The Raja of Thanjavur was made to agree to stop supporting Rajaram through military confrontation. Zulfiqar Khan resorted to foraging and tribute in the absence of consistent supplies from the north, much like the practices of the Maratha forces themselves. The activities of both forces rendered the Coromandel a constant warzone, forcing its inhabitants to flee to fortified European towns, and devastating cultivation in the Carnatic region. Rumours had spread that Zulfiqar Khan was forestalling decisive military action against the fortress due to collusion with Rajaram, though it is also possible that Maratha predations prevented him from taking action. By 1697, Rajaram had run out of funds and was facing political pressure and factionalism. Though he reached out to Aurangzeb for peace talks, the latter refused and demanded complete submission.

=== Capitulation ===
In 1697, Aurangzeb gave the order for an all-out attack on Jinji fortress. Mughal forces captured the outer forts, making their way up the hills. Ahead of the final assault, Rajaram escaped to Vellore fort. Within a matter of days, Mughal forces, namely Afghan and Bundela climbers, scaled the walls and met with a diminished garrison; the fortress was captured on 8 January 1698. The assaults leading up to the fort's capture were led by Zulfiqar Khan's officers Daud Khan Panni and Dalpat Rao Bundela. According to rumours of the time, Rajaram's timely escape was because Zulfiqar Khan or other Mughal officers warned him, possibly foreseeing that a working relationship was necessary with the Marathas after Aurangzeb's death.

== Aftermath ==
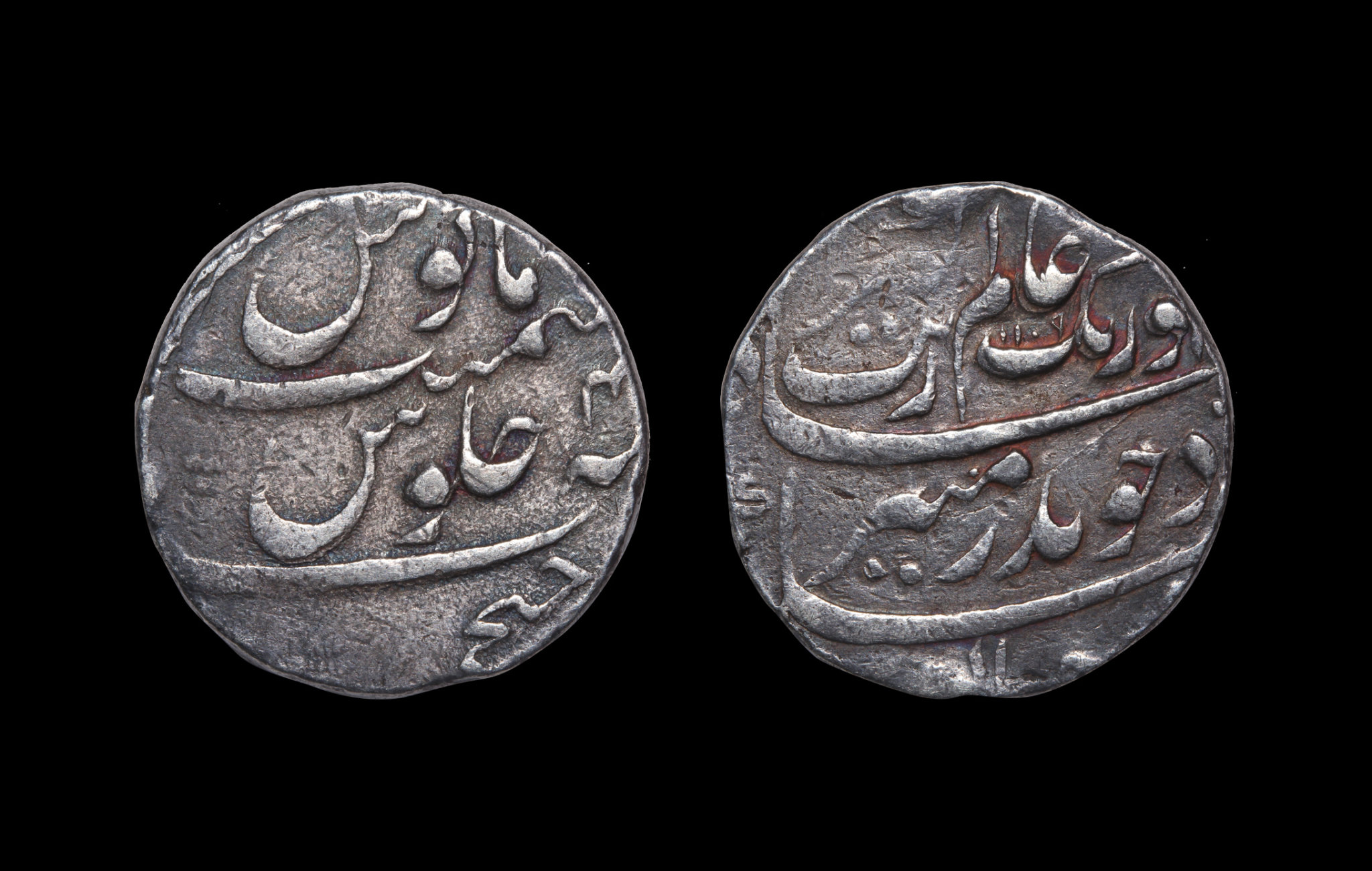
Silver coin struck at Jinji under Aurangzeb's rule

With the capitulation of the fortress, Mughal forces managed to capture unharmed four of Rajaram's queens, three of his sons, and two daughters, who were sent to the imperial camp. The conquered fortress was styled "Nusratgarh" (lit. 'Fort of Victory') after Zulfiqar Khan's title "Nusrat Jung". The Mughal conquest of Jinji added seven districts to the Mughal holdings in the Carnatic region. A year after the conquest, Zulfiqar Khan returned to the imperial camp. He was rewarded with an increase in rank. His deputy Daud Khan Panni was made deputy faujdar of the Carnatic and would go on to campaign actively in the conquered regions to enforce submission to the emperor's authority. The devastation on the countryside wrought by the prolonged siege led to Jinji losing its political and economic status. It served as a mint city under Mughal rule.

Following his escape, Rajaram travelled north and set up his court at Satara in the Maratha heartland around 1698. His escape angered Aurangzeb and led him to personally declare war on the Marathas, aimed at eventually targeting Satara. Hence the capitulation of Jinji led to the focus of the Mughal-Maratha war shifting northwards again. Rajaram campaigned in the Western Deccan against the Mughal provinces of Berar and Khandesh, exacting tribute and chauth, but died in 1700. Aurangzeb would capture many more Maratha forts until his death in 1707, after which the Mughals quickly lost their holdings in the central Deccan, giving rise to the development of independent polities.
