= Munim Khan II =

Grand Vizier of the Mughal Empire from 1707 to 1711

Grand Vizier of the Mughal Empire
- In office 1707 – February 1711
- Leader: Bahadur Shah I
- Preceded by: Asad Khan
- Succeeded by: Hidayatullah Khan

Personal details
- Born: 17th century Bhimber, Mughal Empire (present-day Bhimber)
- Died: February 1711 Near Delhi, Mughal Empire
- Relations: Sultan Beg Barlas (father)
- Children: Khanazad Khan; Mahabat Khan, Third Bakhshi of Mughal Empire

Military service
- Years of service: Before 1700–1711
- Rank: Grand Vizier
- Battles/wars: Mughal war of succession (1707-1709); Rajput Rebellion (1708-1710); First Battle of Lohgarh
- Allegiance: Mughal Empire

Munim Khan II was the Grand Vizier of the Mughal Empire from 1707 to 1711, during the reign of Mughal emperor Bahadur Shah I.

== Background ==
Munim Khan was the son of Sultan Beg Barlas, who was the kotwal of Agra and held a subordinate post in Kashmir. Muhammad Munim and his father returned to Kashmir, but after his father's death Muhamamd Munim went to the Deccan in search of service. In Aurangzeb's reign Munim Khan was made faujdar of Jammu and also the governor of Punjab as an agent of the prince Muhammad Muazzam (later Bahadur Shah I), whose mother was the daughter of a Jarral chieftain in Rajauri, Kashmir. Munim Khan was born in the small town of Bhimber, and was not considered to belong to either of the Irani or Turani parties. Muzaffar Alam connects him with a section of new nobles, especially of Indian Shaikhzada origin, who had been raised by Bahadur Shah I in order to counter the influence of the family of the former Wazir, Asad Khan, a noble of Persian origin. However, Munim Khan was most likely a Muslim Rajput.

== Career ==
During the War of Succession, Munim Khan secured for Muhammad Muazzam the path between Lahore and Delhi. He was later made governor of Lahore. He was instrumental in his rise to the throne. After Aurangzeb's death, Asad Khan had not followed the order of Aurangzeb of giving power to Muhammad Muazzam. However, Muazzam marched to Delhi and proclaimed himself king in 14 March 1707, with the title of Bahadur Shah I. The son of Munim Khan, Khanazad Khan, provided the munitions for war and Munim Khan secured the treasury of Delhi with Sayyid Amjad Khan and posted his own men at the gates. Bahadur Shah defeated the rival contenders to the throne at the Battle of Jajau, and bestowed new ranks and titles on his supporters, with Munim Khan appointed as his Grand Vizier. Bahadur Shah avowed that all his success was owing to his exertions and devotion, and raised him to the highest rank with the title of Khan-i-Khanan. He rose as the most powerful official in Bahadur Shah's court. His son Mahabat Khan became the third Bakhshi.

=== Tenure as Grand Vizier ===
The Rajputs had taken advantage of the death of Aurangzeb by attacking the imperial territories in Ajmer. There was a sharp difference of opinion between Bahadur Shah and Munim Khan on one hand, and Zulfiqar Khan on another, on how to deal with the Rajput rebellions. The latter wanted to conciliate the Rajas by not only readmitting their homelands, but restoring them to high administrative posts, while Munim Khan II was of the opinion that the homelands of the Rajputs should be distributed among the Mughal nobles as part of the Diwan-i-Khalisa (crown lands). Although the Mughals defeated the first Rajput rebellion, another uprising started during Bahadur Shah's campaigns in the Deccan. Munim Khan led an attack of the Sikhs, but failed to capture the Guru, for which he was reprimanded by Bahadur Shah I.

=== Patronage ===
Munim Khan was known for his patronage of the Indian Shaikhzadas. When Ruh-ul-Amin Khan of Bilgram reportedly entered state service with only 60 horsemen and foot soldiers, the Wazir Munim Khan created him a mansab of 6000 and made him his close associate. The rise of Muhammad Murad Kashmiri(later Itiqad Khan), the favorite of the later emperor Farrukhsiyar, originally began through his old friend Munim Khan, who obtained for him a high post and the title of Wakalat Khan.

== Death ==
He died in February 1711 following a brief illness. On his death, Hidayatullah Khan Kashmiri succeeded him as the Wazir of the Mughal empire.
