= Zulfiqar Khan Nusrat Jung =

Mughal noble and general (1649/1657–1713)

Itiqad Khan Nusrat Jung Zulfiqar Khan
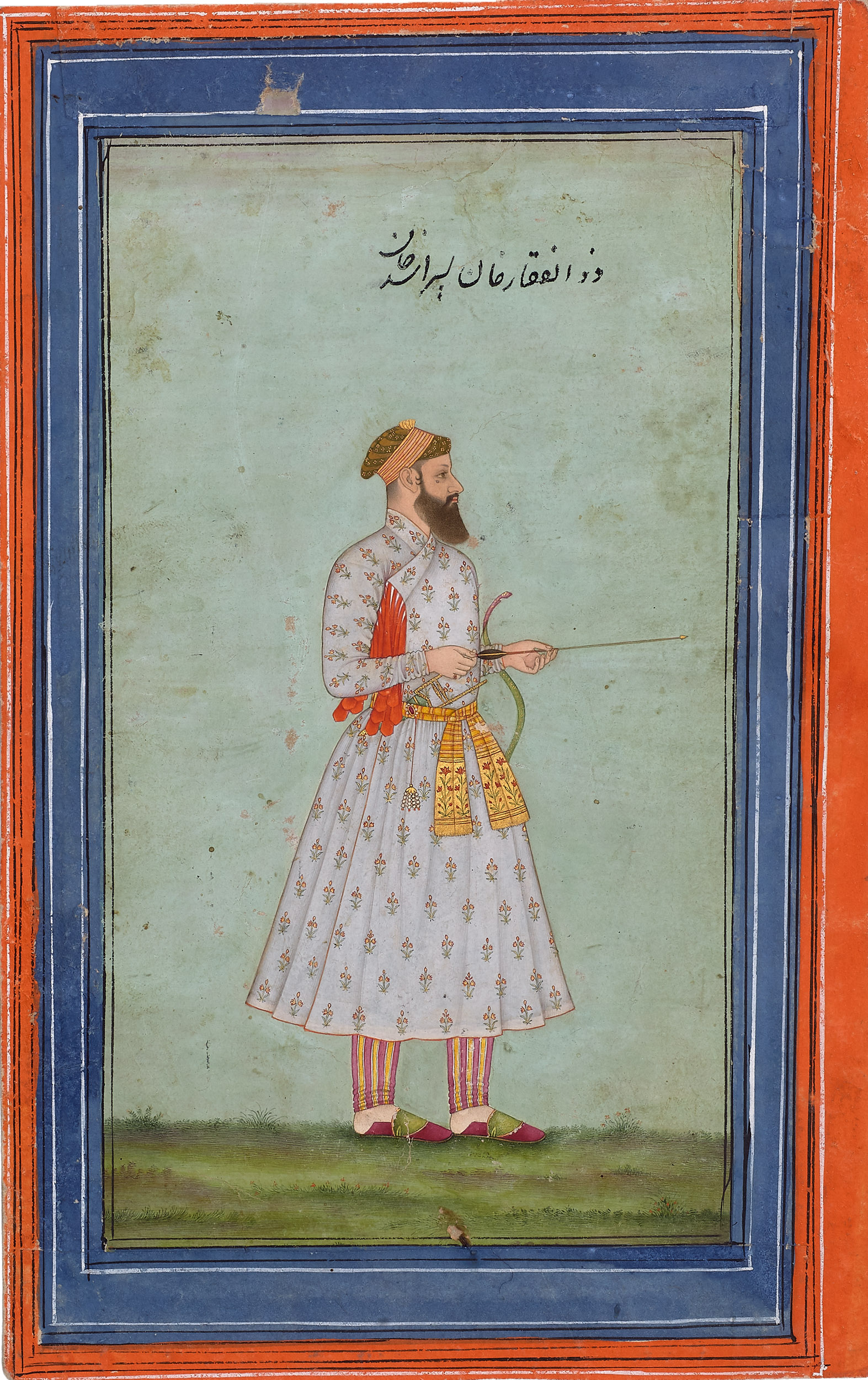
- Portrait of Zulfiqar Khan, c. 1690

Faujdar of the Carnatic
- In office 1692–?
- Monarch: Aurangzeb
- Deputy: Daud Khan Panni
- Preceded by: Ali Mardan Khan

Mir Bakhshi of the Mughal Empire
- In office 1702–1712
- Monarchs: Aurangzeb; Bahadur Shah I
- Preceded by: Bahramand Khan
- Succeeded by: Kokaltash Khan

Viceroy of the Deccan
- In office 1709 – 11 February 1713
- Monarchs: Bahadur Shah I Jahandar Shah
- Deputy: Daud Khan Panni

Wazir of the Mughal Empire
- In office 1712 – 11 February 1713
- Monarch: Jahandar Shah
- Preceded by: Munim Khan

Personal details
- Born: Muhammad Ismail c. 1649/1657
- Died: 11 February 1713
- Parent(s): Asad Khan (father); Mehrunissa Begum (mother)

Military service
- Battles/wars: Battle of Raigarh (1689); Siege of Gingee (1690-1698); Siege of Wagingera (1705); Battle of Jajau (1707)

Muhammad Ismail (1649/1657 – 11 February 1713), known by his title Zulfiqar Khan, was a leading noble and military general of the Mughal Empire. His father was Asad Khan, wazir (prime minister) to Mughal emperor Aurangzeb. During Aurangzeb's reign, Zulfiqar Khan led several military campaigns in pursuit of the emperor's ambitions in the Deccan and South India, notable of which is the Siege of Jinji. He held the post of mir bakhshi (paymaster general), appointed towards the later part of Aurangzeb's reign, and was made governor of the Deccan by emperor Bahadur Shah I. These positions helped make Zulfiqar Khan the most powerful noble in the empire by the early 1700s.

For his role in engineering the accession of emperor Jahandar Shah, Zulfiqar Khan has been termed the first kingmaker in Mughal history. During this emperor's brief reign, Zulfiqar Khan served as wazir (prime minister) and acted as effective ruler of the empire, before being executed in 1713 by claimant to the throne Farrukhsiyar.

== Early life ==
Zulfiqar Khan was born as Muhammad Ismail. According to historian Satish Chandra, he was born in 1649, while William Irvine states he was born in 1657. His father was Asad Khan, who would later become Aurangzeb's long-serving wazir (prime minister) and a leading figure in Mughal politics. Patrilineally, Muhammad Ismail belonged to an Iranian family - his grandfather Khanlar had moved to India after his great-grandfather Zulfiqar Khan, the beglar begi of Safavid Shirvan, was executed around 1600 by Iran's emperor Shah Abbas I. Muhammad Ismail's mother was Mehrunissa Begum, daughter of Asaf Khan, wazir during the reign of Shah Jahan.

As a child, Muhammad Ismail was formally incorporated into the Mughal nobility through the grant of a mansab (rank). In 1677, he was married to a daughter of Mughal noble Shaista Khan, and awarded the title 'Itiqad Khan' (lit. 'The Trustworthy Lord').

== Career ==
=== Reign of Aurangzeb ===
In 1689, Muhammad Ismail (now entitled Itiqad Khan) succeeded in capturing the Maratha fort of Raigad, upon the orders of Aurangzeb. The main objective of the battle was to capture the Maratha king Rajaram Bhonsle, but Rajaram managed to escape to the fort of Jinji. On the other hand, Itiqad Khan did manage to capture the family of Sambhaji, Rajaram's predecessor; his young son Shahu would become a key asset in the Mughal struggle against the Marathas. A large amount of treasure was also procured from the fort. For this success, Muhammad Ismail's rank was increased, and he was awarded the title 'Zulfiqar Khan'.

From the late 1680s onwards, the nobility of Aurangzeb's court was split into two major factions; one was led by Zulfiqar Khan and his father Asad Khan. The other faction was led by Ghaziuddin Khan, Chin Qilich Khan, and Muhammad Amin Khan. The defining difference between the two sides was the question of how to deal with the Marathas; Zulfiqar Khan and his faction generally espoused a conciliatory approach, while the other side insisted on a more hardline attitude.

In 1690, Zulfiqar Khan was assigned to command the Siege of Jinji by Aurangzeb, in order to pursue the escaped Rajaram. Mughal prince Kam Bakhsh was also assigned to the command in 1691. The siege proved difficult due to the strength of the fort and frequent supply line disruptions by the Marathas, resulting in slow progress. In 1693 Kam Bakhsh opened negotiations with Rajaram against Aurangzeb's orders; Zulfiqar Khan and his father Asad Khan arrested him upon uncovering this. The siege continued through the decade - during this time, Zulfiqar Khan gradually built local connections with Deccani nobility. Beginning in 1690, he also led periodic raids on the kingdoms of Tanjore and Trichinopoly, pocketing major portions of the wealth gathered. In 1692, he was appointed by Aurangzeb as faujdar of the Carnatic (formerly a southern province of the Golconda Sultanate) following the capture of Ali Mardan Khan, the previous faujdar and provincial diwan of the region, by Maratha forces. This represented a shift in the Mughal administration of the Carnatic to a system that was purely military-controlled.

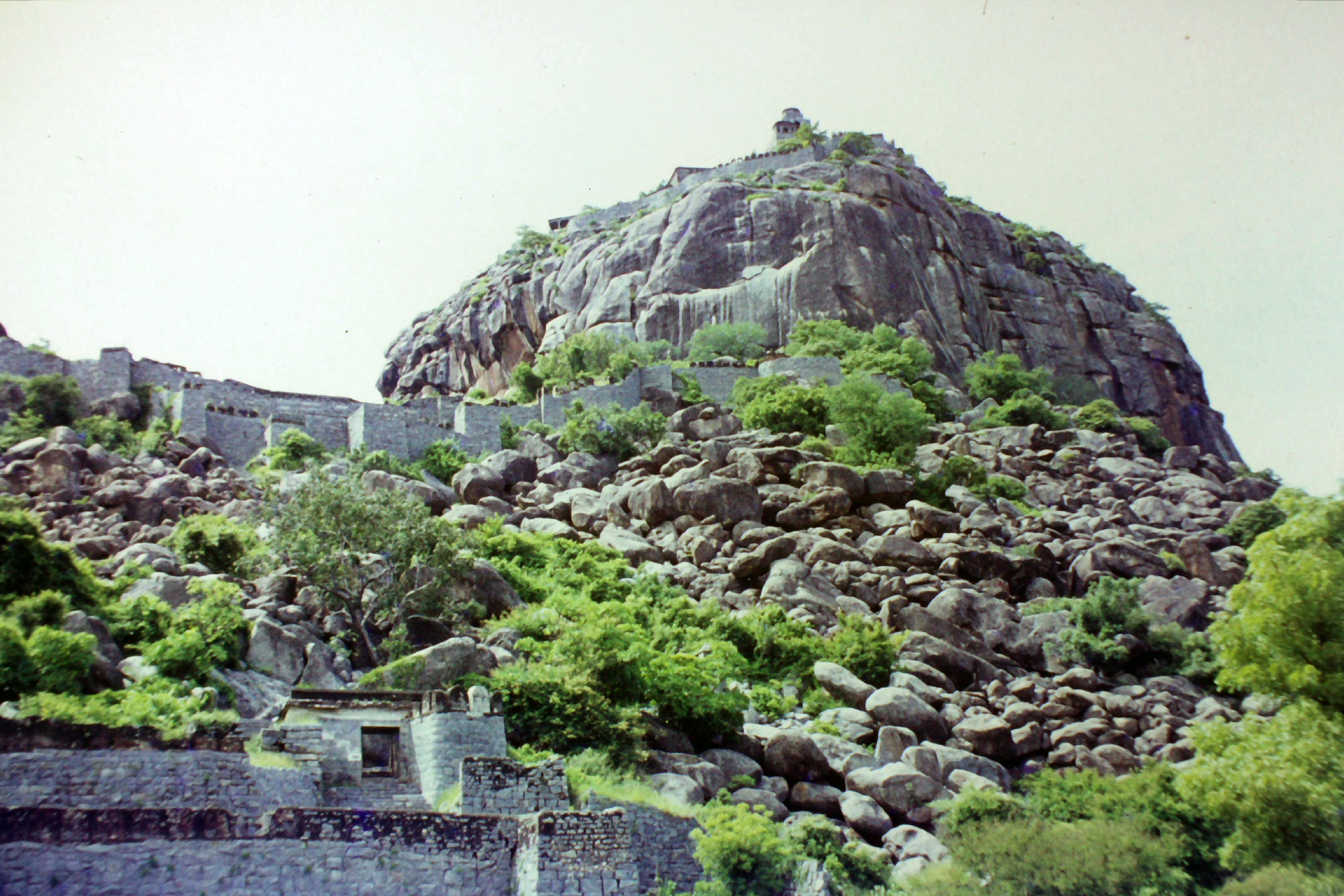
View of the Jinji Fort, whose capture earned Zulfiqar Khan the title 'Nusrat Jung'

The lengthy duration of the Siege of Jinji led contemporary observers to accuse Zulfiqar Khan of collusion with the enemy. In 1698, Jinji fort finally fell, but Rajaram once again evaded capture. Zulfiqar Khan had his rank raised, and was awarded the title 'Nusrat Jung'; the fort was styled 'Nusratgarh'. Zulfiqar Khan was recalled to the emperor's camp, and his close subordinate Daud Khan Panni served as deputy faujdar of the Carnatic in his absence.

Following this event, Zulfiqar Khan was sent on several pursuits to combat Maratha insurgency. In 1702, he was appointed mir bakhshi (paymaster general) of the empire following the death of the incumbent, Bahramand Khan. This made him one of the most highly ranked figures of the empire after his father. His next notable military campaign was in 1705 at the Siege of Wagingera, where he assisted emperor Aurangzeb in turning the tide of the battle against Pidia Nayak. However, Pidia Nayak escaped, and Aurangzeb suspected Zulfiqar Khan of taking bribes from him. Nevertheless, for his assistance his rank was further raised.

Aurangzeb died in 1707, and a war of succession broke out between his sons. Zulfiqar Khan and his father Asad Khan reluctantly sided with prince Azam Shah. Azam Shah's army faced that of prince Muhammad Mu'azzam in the Battle of Jajau the same year. Amidst severe losses on Azam's side, Zulfiqar Khan advised a retreat - however, Azam pressed on. Zulfiqar Khan deserted Azam and fled to Gwalior, sustaining minor injuries, while Azam was killed.

=== Reign of Bahadur Shah ===
Muhammad Muazzam ascended the throne as emperor Bahadur Shah in 1707. Zulfiqar Khan (along with other nobles) was invited to the court and reconciled, despite siding with Azam in the war of succession, in keeping with Mughal tradition. While his father Asad Khan lost the post of wazir to Munim Khan, Zulfiqar Khan himself had his rank raised, and he was reconfirmed in his post of mir bakhshi. In 1709, Zulfiqar Khan was also awarded the governorship of the Deccan (he served in absentee, with Daud Khan Panni acting as his deputy), following Bahadur Shah's defeat of his brother Kam Bakhsh. These posts were highly influential and lucrative, giving Zulfiqar Khan unprecedented power for a noble, and making him one of the most significant men in the Mughal empire. In his capacity as governor of the Deccan, Zulfiqar Khan sought to introduce conciliatory policies with the Marathas, centred around recognizing Shahu as the rightful Maratha king (as Aurangzeb had intended). However, Bahadur Shah did not take this advice, inviting further Maratha raids and attacks, commanded by Shahu.

In 1710, Zulfiqar Khan was able to negotiate partial control over the grant of mansab (rank) to nobles, restricting the authority of the emperor himself. Zulfiqar Khan also sought the position of wazir for his family, as his father no longer occupied the post; he constantly moved against the incumbent Munim Khan until the latter's death in 1711. Zulfiqar Khan thereupon insisted that the position of wazir should go back to his father Asad Khan - this was rejected, since it entailed that a single family would occupy three incredibly powerful posts of the empire. Zulfiqar Khan prevented the emperor from appointing a wazir for the remainder of his reign, and the duties of the post lay split between multiple officials. Historian Munis Faruqui uses these examples to point out Zulfiqar Khan's rising power, at the expense of Bahadur Shah's regnal authority.

In 1712, Bahadur Shah fell ill and lay on his deathbed, which triggered a war of succession between his sons. The most powerful prince was Azim-us-Shan, who had wielded considerable influence at Bahadur Shah's court, and commanded significant wealth as governor of Bengal. The other three contenders for the throne were Jahan Shah, Rafi-us-Shan, and Jahandar Shah, of whom the latter was the weakest. Zulfiqar Khan, now the most powerful noble in the empire, was able to orchestrate the victory of Jahandar Shah. He created an alliance between the three princes and aided them in defeating Azim-us-Shan, and then supported Jahandar Shah in killing off the remaining princes. By single-handedly engineering the accession of the weakest prince at the expense of the strongest, Zulfiqar Khan had made Jahandar Shah's claim to the throne completely dependent on himself. For his actions, Munis Faruqui calls Zulfiqar Khan the first 'kingmaker' in Mughal history. According to Richard Eaton, this set the precedent for the practice of power brokers hoisting Mughal puppet rulers onto the throne, such as the example of the Sayyid brothers and Farrukhsiyar.

Chronicles indicate that Zulfiqar Khan had ambitions to centre the administration of the empire around a single wazir (a post he sought for himself) while the reign of the empire was split between princes; this may have been the basis of the alliance between princes, though Abhishek Kaicker suggests that this may instead have been a fictional device used by future chroniclers to make sense of the events surrounding the war of succession.

=== Reign of Jahandar Shah ===
Jahandar Shah ascended the throne a month after Bahadur Shah's death in 1712. Upon his accession, he raised Zulfiqar Khan to the position of wazir of the empire; the post of mir bakhshi passed to Kokaltash Khan, the emperor's foster-brother. Due to Jahandar Shah's dependence on Zulfiqar Khan, the latter wielded effective power over the empire, marking the first time in Mughal history that the emperor relinquished control. Zulfiqar Khan also continued to hold absentee governorship of the Deccan, administered by his deputy Daud Khan Panni.

As effective ruler, Zulfiqar Khan attempted to build bridges with the Rajputs, Sikhs, and Marathas, who had become increasingly estranged from the empire. He abolished the jizya (religious tax), and awarded prestigious positions to Rajput rulers Jai Singh II and Ajit Singh. He continued conciliatory policies with the Marathas he had instituted as governor of the Deccan, and formally recognized Shivaji II. Such policies were well received by these groups. However, Zulfiqar Khan held a precarious position in the court, failing to win the support of key nobles such as Chin Qilich Khan and Muhammad Amin Khan, as well as those in the emperor's close circles, such as Lal Kunwar. Zulfiqar Khan's power and authority caused the emperor Jahandar Shah himself to conspire against him out of fear, as the latter attempted to appoint his own associates to key positions of the empire. Additionally, Zulfiqar Khan faced an eroding tax administration system, which had worsened during Bahadur Shah's reign.

Jahandar Shah's reign, and Zulfiqar Khan's administration, was brief; a son of the deceased prince Azim-us-Shan named Farrukhsiyar launched a rebellion with the support of the Sayyid brothers. With an underpaid and ill-organized army, Jahandar Shah was soundly defeated in Agra, January 1713.

== Death ==
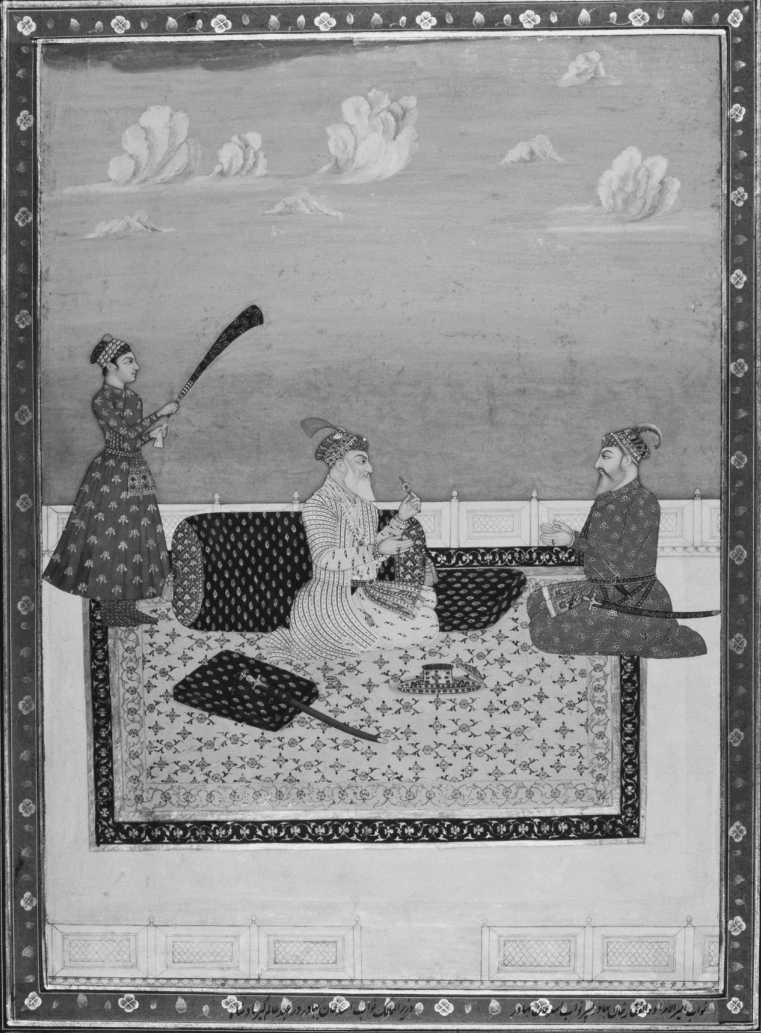
Zulfiqar Khan and his father Asad Khan in debate on what to do with captive emperor Jahandar Shah

Following defeat, Jahandar Shah arrived in Delhi at Asad Khan's house, seeking protection with him and Zulfiqar Khan. However, the two decided to turn over the emperor to Farrukhsiyar, in hopes of securing favour with the latter. This decision was the subject of scrutiny in several chronicles of the period, though many accounts of the rationale behind the decision are likely fictional. The strategy did not pay off, and Zulfiqar Khan was executed by Farrukhsiyar on 11 February 1713, despite assurance otherwise. The bodies of Zulfiqar Khan and Jahandar Shah were paraded on elephants in Delhi, and left to rot in front of the Delhi Gate. According to William Irvine, Zulfiqar Khan was then buried by a gate of Humayun's Tomb in Delhi, and a few years later a tomb was constructed at the site by Sayyid Hussain Ali Khan.

== See also ==
- Carnatic Sultanate
- Nawabs of Arcot

== Bibliography ==
- Chandra, Satish (2002). Parties and politics at the Mughal Court, 1707-1740 (4th ed.). New Delhi: Oxford University Press. ISBN 0-19-565444-7. OCLC 50004530.
- Irvine, William (1971). Later Mughals. Atlantic Publishers and Distributors.
- Faruqui, Munis D (2012), Princes of the Mughal Empire, 1504-1719, Cambridge: Cambridge University Press, ISBN 978-1-139-52619-7, OCLC 808366461
