= Inayatullah Kashmiri =

18th-century Mughal noble

Inayatullah Kashmiri was a prominent Mughal noble of Kashmiri descent in the early 1700s, in the position of the Diwan-i-Tan-o Khalisa.

Inayatullah Khan's father was Mirza Shukrullah, and his ancestors were from Kashmir . Inayatullah was the father of Hidayatullah Khan, the Grand Vizier of Bahadur Shah I. He was himself one of the descendants of Qazi Musa Shahid. In 1712, Inayatullah Khan was made the personal governor of Kashmir, where he led a campaign to subdue the Bomba tribal leader, Muzaffar Khan, who had seized the Drava and Karnah districts of Kashmir. Jahandar Shah died while Inayatullah Khan was engaged in the rebellion. Inayatullah Kashmiri's governorship in Kashmir was cancelled with the accession of Farrukhsiyar, who had appointed his father-in-law, Mir Muhammad Taqi Hussaini Saadat Khan, another Kashmiri as the governor. Later, Farrukhsiyar made Inayatullah Khan the Diwan-i-Tan-o-Khalsa and the Khan-i-Saman, in order to gain his support against the Sayyid Brothers. In the reign of Farrukhsiyar, Inayatullah was responsible for the re-imposition of Jizyah after the death of Aurangzeb:

"Inayatullah has placed before me a letter form the Sherif of Mecca urging that the collection of jizya is obligatory according to our Holy book. In a matter of faith, I am powerless to interfere."

In 1717 he was re-appointed the governor of Kashmir. He set fire to the Hindu area of Srinagar and forbade the Pandits from wearing turbans. Inayatullah Khan raised an army in order to overthrow the Sayyid Brothers, during the nominal rule of Shah Jahan II, but was seized at Delhi and thrown into prison on June, 1719. In 1724 Inayatullah Khan was re-appointed as governor of Kashmir for a third time. Inayatullah Khan died in 1727. He is known to have six sons :

- Diya Ullah Khan, was appointed Diwan of Akbarabad in 1705. He had two sons, both of whom moved to Hyderabad: the older, Thana Ullah Khan, a son-in-law of Mubariz Khan, was the briefly governor of Bijapur under Asaf Jah I, and Aman Ullah Khan;
- Hidayatullah Khan, his second son and the Grand Vizier of the Mughal Empire;
- Kifayat Ullah Khan;
- Atit Ullah Khan, who was given the title of Inayatullah Khan and succeeded his father as governor of Kashmir;
- Ubaydullah Khan;
- Abdullah Khan Mansur-ad-Dawlah
- A daughter, married to Mubariz Khan Imad-ul-Mulk, and had five sons and one daughter from this marriage.
