= Hidayatullah Khan =

Grand Vizier of the Mughal Empire from 1711 to 1713

Grand Vizier of the Mughal Empire
- In office 1711–1713
- Preceded by: Munim Khan II
- Succeeded by: Zulfiqar Khan

Personal details
- Parent: Inayatullah Kashmiri

Hidayatullah Khan, also known as Wazarat Khan, was the Grand Vizier of Bahadur Shah I.

He was born as the son of Inayatullah Kashmiri. After his appointment as Wazir, he was known as Wazarat Khan, After a short time, Wazarat Khan asked for the title of Saadullah Khan which was the title of the most renowned Wazir of Shah Jahan. The Emperor replied, "It is not easy to be a Sadullah Khan, let him be known as Saidullah Khan." Nonetheless, he was popularly known by the name of Saadullah Khan.
