= Jafar Zatalli =

Mir Muhammad Ja’far Zattali میر محمد جعفر زٹلی
- Born: 1658; Narnaul, Subah of Delhi, Mughal Empire
- Died: 1713 (aged 54–55)
- Cause of death: Strangling
- Occupations: Poet; Satirist; Humorist
- Era: Late Mughal Period
- Known for: Urdu poetry; Politcal satire

Mir Muhammad Ja'far Zatalli (Urdu: میر محمد جعفر زٹلی), usually written as Jafar Zatalli, was an Indo-Persian poet and prose writer from Mughal Delhi who is often considered as the first satirist in the Urdu language. He adopted the pen name "ZatalIi", which means babbler of nonsense.

Zatalli is known for his scathing, profane diatribes criticizing the Mughal elite of his time through poems and parodies. One of his famous works includes 'Gandu-Nama', which is a poem mocking the then Mughal Emperor Bahadur Shah I. Zattali was strangled to death with a shoelace on the order of Emperor Farrukhsiyar for attacking the emperor in one of his poems.

== Personal life ==
Not much is known about Jafar Zatalli's early life. Most sources state that he was born in 1658 in the city of Narnaul near Delhi, modern-day Haryana, and belonged to a Syed family of Shia Muslims. Zatalli's formative years were marked by the decline of the Mughal Empire. So, his poetry was heavily influenced by the political and cultural milieu of Delhi during that time.

== Career ==
Zatalli wrote in Rekhta, which is usually considered the early form of Urdu. He began his work during the time of Aurangzeb whom he portrayed ambivalently. While he criticized the emperor in his writings at times, he also praised Aurangzeb and showed a degree of deference for him. Once, an elderly statesman complained to Aurangzeb about Zatalli's satire making fun of his marriage. Aurangzeb dismissed the man's concern, saying that Zatalli had written satire about him too, and that he was harmless.

=== Social commentary ===
In the following years, Zatalli intensified his criticism and mockery of the upper echelons of society. He attacked royal nobility, clergymen and Mughal officials for their corruption and moral decay, which he deemed responsible for the downfall of his homeland. His crude and vulgar language made him a controversial figure even during his life.

He once pilloried Prince Kam Baksh in a couplet where he made fun of the prince by saying he ought to engage in the act of bestiality. A few years later, he wrote an even more vulgar and audacious poem titled Gandu-Nama in which he attacked Bahadur Shah I as a sodomite.

=== Style ===
Zatalli is characterized as a lampoonish and iconoclastic Urdu poet and writer who directly criticized famous, important personalities of his time. That is why many historians of Urdu literature considered him to be the first satirist of the language.

== Death ==
Jafar Zatalli was reportedly strangled to death with a shoelace for a satirical couplet ridiculing the newly crowned Mughal emperor Farrukhsiyar. After Farrukhsiyar minted a coin bearing an inscription exalting himself, Zatalli mocked him, writing that peas and pulses were the prevailing currency under an emperor who killed with a shoelace. Enraged by this, Farrukhsiyar ordered Zatalli's execution. Zatalli was killed in Delhi sometime between 1713 and 1716.
