= Asad Khan (Mughal noble) =

Mughal noble (1626/1631–1716)

Asaf-ud-Daula Asad Khan
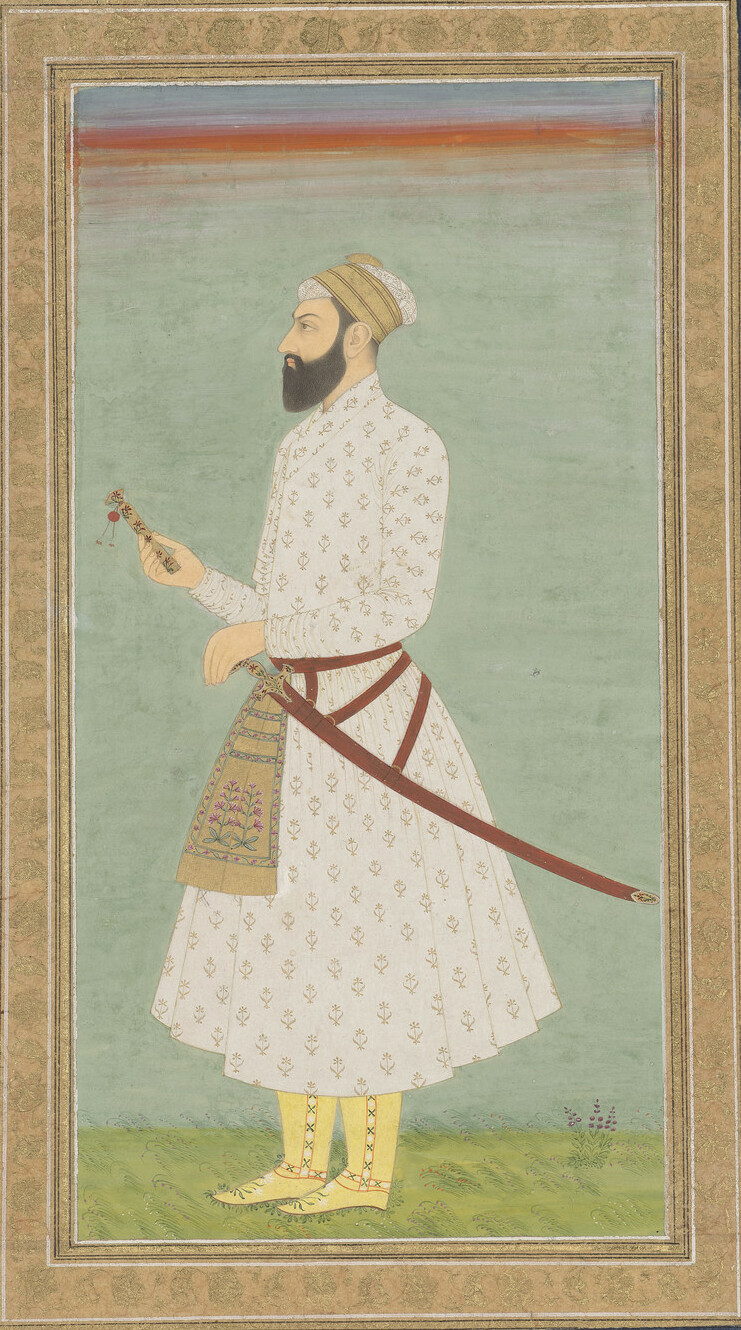
- Portrait of Asad Khan in the Royal Collection, c. 1700

Wazir of the Mughal Empire
- In office 1676–1707
- Monarch: Aurangzeb Alamgir

Vakil-i-Mutlaq of the Mughal Empire
- In office 1707–?
- Monarchs: Bahadur Shah I, Jahandar Shah

Subahdar of Gujarat
- In office 1712–?
- Monarch: Jahandar Shah

Personal details
- Born: Muhammad Ibrahim c. 1626/31
- Died: 15 June 1716 (aged 84–90)
- Children: Zulfiqar Khan Nusrat Jung; Inayat Khan
- Parent: Zulfiqar Khan Qaramanlu

Military service
- Battles/wars: Siege of Jinji

Asad Khan (c. 1626/1631 – 15 June 1716), born Muhammad Ibrahim, was a high-ranking noble of the Mughal Empire during the reigns of Aurangzeb and Bahadur Shah. He is known for his tenure as the wazir (prime minister) of emperor Aurangzeb in the period 1676–1707, and was an important player in Mughal court politics.

== Early life ==
Asad Khan was born around 1626 or 1631 as Muhammad Ibrahim, into a prestigious family of Safavid Iran. His grandfather, named Zulfiqar Khan, was beglar begi of Shirvan during the reign of the Safavid king Shah Abbas I. However, he was executed around 1600 by Shah Abbas, and the family fell out of favor.

Subsequently, Asad Khan's father Khanlar, known by the title Zulfiqar Khan Qaramanlu, migrated to India around the end of Mughal emperor Jahangir's reign. He was accepted in the court of emperor Shah Jahan and married the daughter of Sadiq Khan, brother-in-law to Mughal noble Asaf Khan. Asad Khan was born to them as Zulfiqar Khan Qaramanlu's eldest son.

== Career ==
Asad Khan entered Mughal imperial service in 1654, during the 27th year of Mughal emperor Shah Jahan's reign. Under Shah Jahan's successor Aurangzeb, Asad Khan occupied the post of second bakhshi (paymaster) until 1670, when he was made deputy to the wazir. He held this position until 1676, when he became wazir himself.

From the 1680s onwards, nobles of Aurangzeb split into two main factions; Asad Khan and his influential son Zulfiqar Khan emerged as the leaders of one side, while Ghaziuddin Khan and Chin Qilich Khan headed the other. These factions determined noble politics towards the end of Aurangzeb's reign.

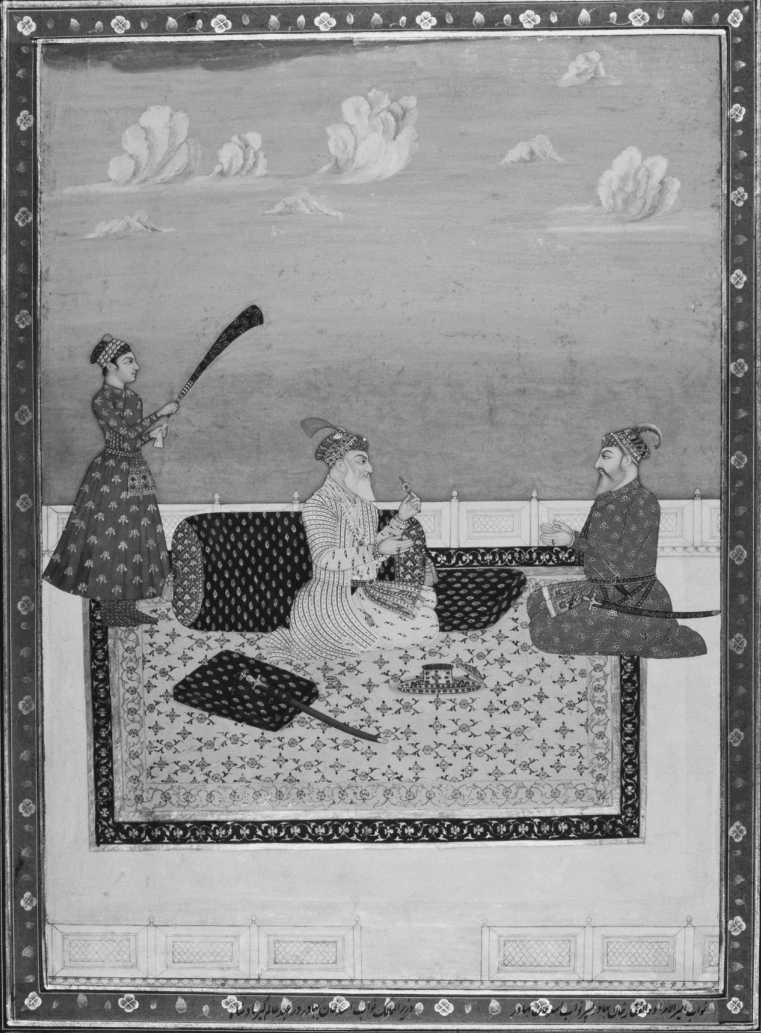
Painting of Mughal nobles Asad Khan and son Zu'l Faqar Khan, in debate on what to do with captive emperor Jahandar Shah.

From 1684, Asad Khan served in the Deccan. He seized the towns of Kurnool and Cuddapah in order to secure supply lines to facilitate the Siege of Jinji, which was led by his son Zulfiqar Khan. In 1691, Aurangzeb sent Asad Khan and the prince Kam Bakhsh to Jinji to aid Zulfiqar Khan in the siege. Upon difficulties securing the fort, Kam Bakhsh discreetly opened negotiations with the enemy against Aurangzeb's direct orders. Asad Khan and his son learned of this and readily arrested him; he was then mistreated, and Asad Khan is known to have abused Kam Bakhsh directly. Aurangzeb thereupon threatened to relieve Asad Khan of the wazir position, but never acted on this. Munis Faruqui underlines this event as illustrative of how Aurangzeb protected his nobles, sometimes at the expense of the royal princes.

Aurangzeb in his last will is thought to have appointed Asad Khan as wazir indefinitely after his demise. In the succession struggle following Aurangzeb's death, Asad Khan and his son allied with prince Azam Shah. However, prince Muhammad Muazzam defeated him in the Battle of Jajau and ascended the throne as Bahadur Shah. As emperor, Bahadur Shah sought to weaken the influence of Asad Khan and Zulfiqar Khan by giving the position of wazir to Munim Khan, ending Asad Khan's tenure as wazir in 1707. Asad Khan was instead given the high position of Vakil-i-Mutlaq, which had not been in use since the reign of Shah Jahan. This was to the discontent of Asad Khan, and he was still able to negotiate partial control over the post of wazir. Asad Khan's rank was also increased to 8000 horses, and he was granted the title Asaf-ud-Daula.

in 1712, Bahadur Shah was succeeded by his son Jahandar Shah, under whom Asad Khan remained wakil-i-mutlaq. He was also made governor of Gujarat, although he held this position in absentee. The following year, Jahandar Shah was defeated in battle by Farrukhsiyar, and sought refuge at Asad Khan's household. Asad Khan and his son Zulfiqar Khan, despite having supported Jahandar Shah uptil then, decided to turn over Jahandar Shah to the new emperor. However, Farrukhsiyar was mistrustful of Asad Khan and had his son killed. Asad Khan then spent the rest of his life in obscurity, and died on 15 June 1716.

== Family ==
Asad Khan was married to Mehrunissa, daughter of Asaf Khan. Zulfiqar Khan was born to them in the year 1657; he was married to a daughter of noble Shaista Khan in 1677. Asad Khan had another son from his wife Nawal Bai named Inayat Khan, who was married to the youngest daughter of Abul Hasan Qutb Shah, the last ruler of the Golconda Sultanate. Asad Khan also had a daughter who was married to Khuda Bandah Khan, son of noble Shaista Khan. Of his sons, Zulfiqar Khan had no children. Inayat Khan went insane in his last days, and died in Delhi living two sons: Salih Khan and Mirza Kazim. Salih Khan attained high rank in the reign of Jahandar Shah and was entitled Itiqad Khan, while Mirza Kazim ruined his reputation and career by his "association with dancers".
