= Rao Dalpat Bundela =

Rao Dalpat Bundela (died 14 June 1707) was a Bundela king of Datia-Orchha. One of Aurangzeb's trusted military commanders, he had a key role in the 1698 breach of the siege of Jinji fort. He was one of the commanders at the siege of Wagingera, the last battle personally supervised by Aurangzeb.

After Aurangzeb's death in March 1707, he joined his second son Muhammad Azam Shah. On 14 June 1707, he was killed at the Battle of Jajau, where he was "struck by a ball from a swivel-piece, which entered at the chin and came out at his back." At this battle, Bahadur Shah I emerged victorious.
