= Siege of Wagingera =

1704 siege by Mughals

Date	27 March – 18 May 1704 (1 month and 3 weeks)
Location	Wagingera Fort
Result	Mughal victory

Belligerents
Mughal Empire	Bedars

Commanders and leaders
Aurangzeb; Zulfikar Khan; Daud Khan Panni; Asaf Jah I Rao Dalpat Bundela	Pedda Pidia Nayak

Strength
Total: 40,000	Total: 9,000

During the final siege of Wagingera, the Mughal Emperor Aurangzeb sent for Zulfiqar Khan Nusrat Jung who arrived on March 27, and the next day attacked Lal Tikri Hillock which was lost to the Bedars in the early days of the siege and retook it. The Bedars retreated to the village at the foot of Talwargera and began operating from behind its mud wall. Many Rajputs fell in this daring attack. But Zulfiqar Khan Nusrat Jung did not stop there. He sent Rao Dalpat Bundela to another mound which was taken and the Bedars fled to the village of Dhedpura, where he was ambushed. But Zulfiqar Khan Nusrat Jung held his position. A few days afterwards Zulfiqar Khan Nusrat Jung made a strategic move and captured the wells from where the Bedars used to draw their water. He attacked Talwargera on April 27 taking the village.

== Siege ==
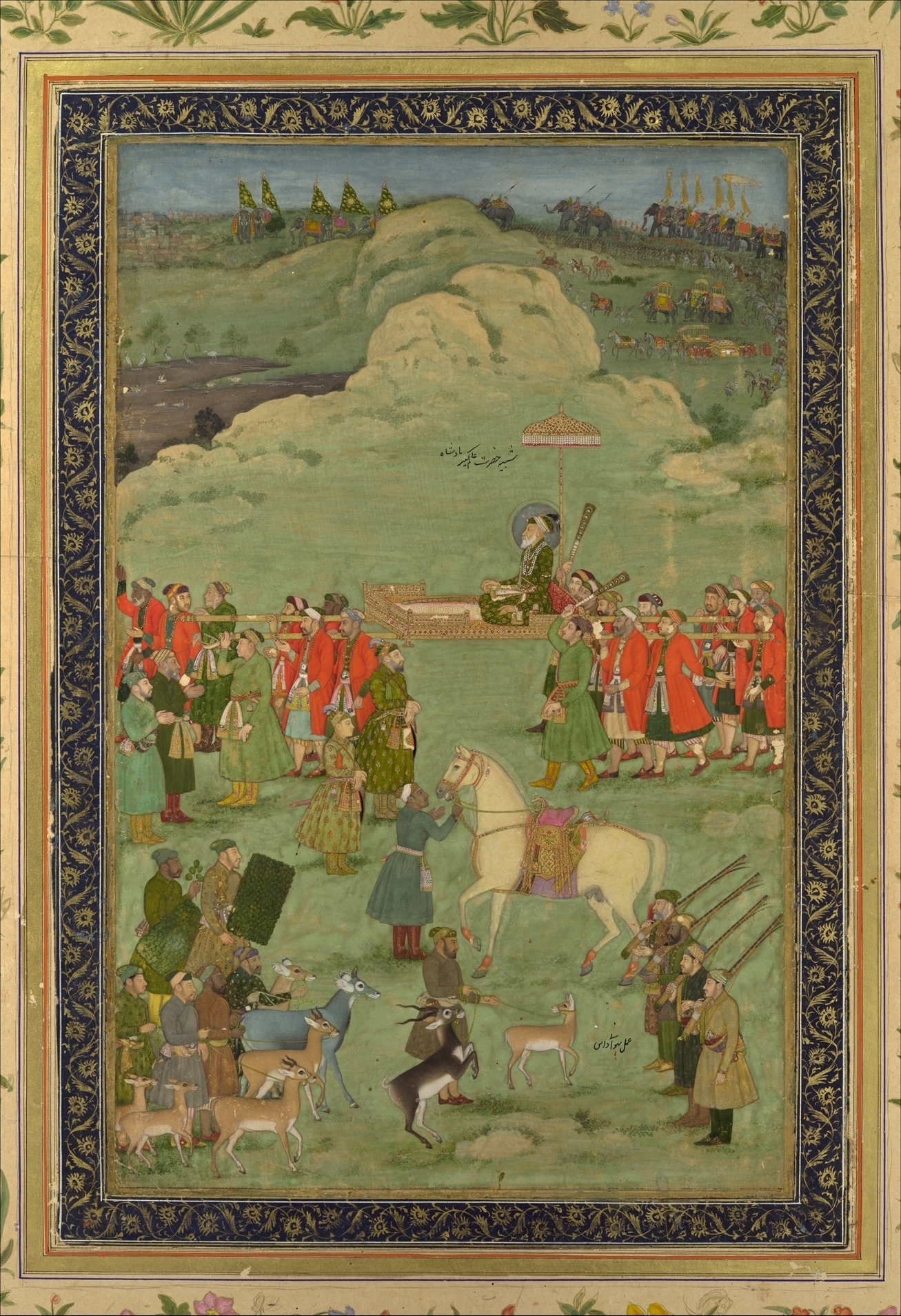
The Mughal Emperor Aurangzeb leads his final expedition (1705).

With the arrival of Zulfiqar Khan Nusrat Jung the Bedars were now hard pressed. The siege weapons were pushed forward to the fort, and on the day appointed for the assault, Mughal Emperor Aurangzeb mounted his horse to take part therein, and took his position at a cannon-shot distance from the fort. The enemy was overpowered, and some positions were captured. Being greatly dispirited, Pedda Pidia Nayak, commander of the fort, directed his people to take their wives and children, their jewels, and whatever they could carry, and after setting fire to the temple and other buildings, they went out from another gate, and by some outlets which had been prepared for such an occasion, they made their way to the Maratha army, in parties, in the dark of night.

The conflagration in the fort and the cessation of the firing made the Mughals aware of their flight. A party of men entered, and found only disabled and wounded persons who were unable to fly. On the 14th day of Muharram, the Mughal Army took possession of the place after a siege of three months. The name Wagingera was changed to Fort Rahman Bakhsh. The Mughal Army then retired to pass the rainy season at Deogaon, three or four kos from the River Krishna.

Mughal Emperor Aurangzeb bestowed upon Asaf Jah I the title of "Chin Kilich Khan" (boy swordsman) for surviving an attack that blew off three of his horse's legs during the Siege of Wagingera Fort. He was also gifted a female elephant now aged 20. For fighting on and capturing the fort he was raised to rank of 5000 horse and awarded 15 million dams, a jeweled sabre and a third elephant.

== Aftermath ==
A plaque embedded on the wall to the entrance of the fort reads in Persian:

By command of the emperor, defender of faith, Abul Muzaffar Muhy-ud-Din Muhammad Aurangzeb Alamgir, king, conqueror of the universe, may Allah preserve his country forever.

- signifying the fall of the fort in 1705.

By now the elderly Emperor was exhausted and returned to Ahmednagar on January 31, 1706. The siege of Wagingera would be his last battle. He died in 1707 and was succeeded by his son Bahadur Shah I.

== See also ==
- Zulfiqar Khan Nusrat Jung
- Asaf Jah I
