= Udaipuri Mahal =

Concubine of Mughal emperor Aurangzeb (died 1707)

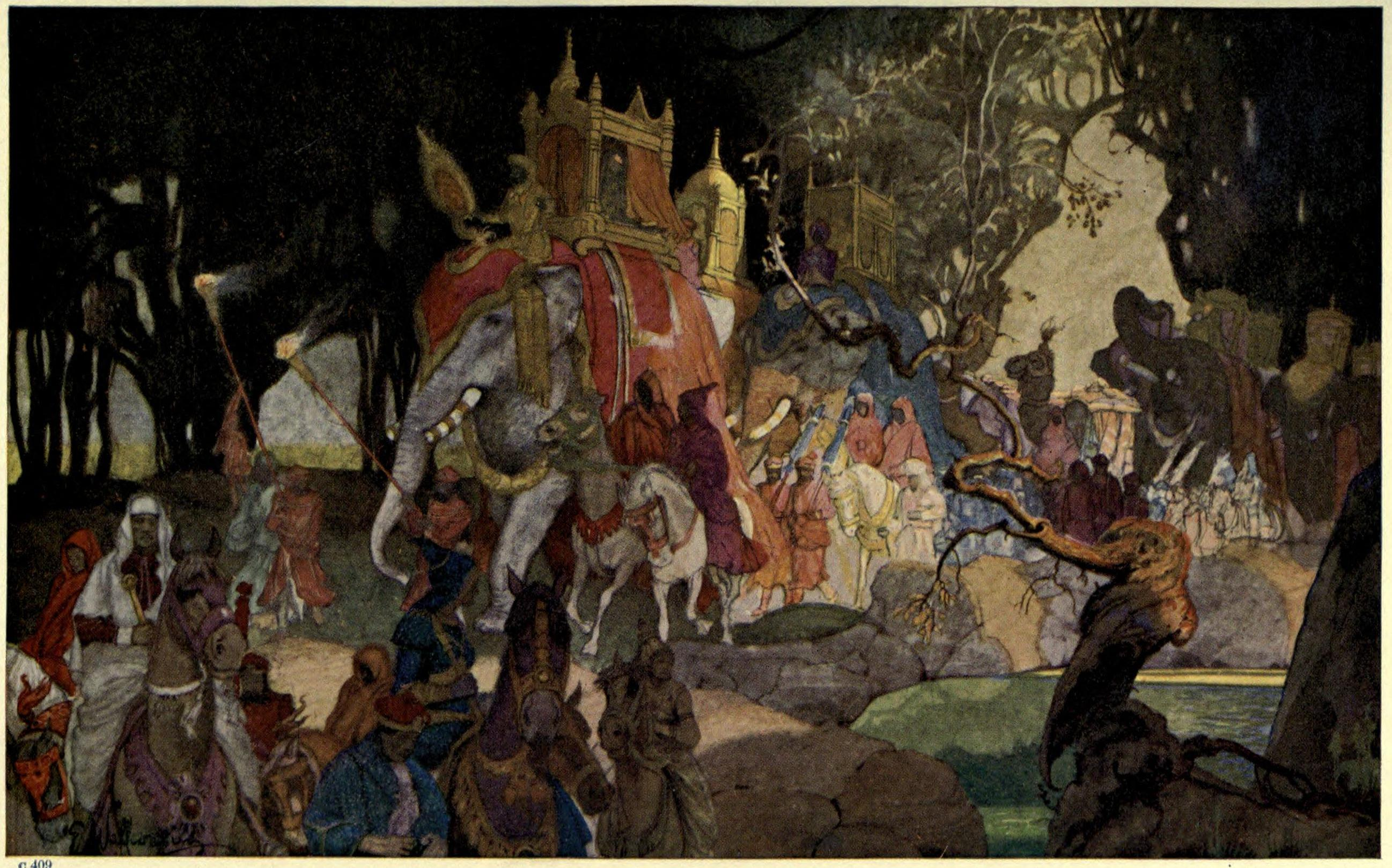
- Died: July 1707; Gwalior, Mughal Empire
- Burial: Shrine of Qutb-al Aqtab, Delhi
- Consort: Aurangzeb
- Issue: Muhammad Kam Bakhsh
- Religion: Islam

Udaipuri Mahal (Persian: اودے پوری محل; died July 1707) was a consort of the Mughal emperor Aurangzeb.

== Life ==
Described as 'the darling of Aurangzeb's old age', Udaipuri Mahal had been a slave girl in the harem of Aurangzeb's elder brother Prince Dara Shikoh, and before entering the harem, she had been a dancing girl.

She was either from Kashmir, or from nearby Udaipur, or as stated by her contemporary, the Venetian traveler Manucci, she was a Georgian Christian. Other sources have stated Armenia or Circassia. Ever since the reign of Emperor Akbar, it had been ordained that the names of the women of the imperial Mughal harem should not be mentioned in public, they should be designated by some epithet, derived either from the place of their birth or the city or country where they had entered the imperial harem.

She was described as having red hair that captivated Aurangzeb, and loved him deeply. This made Aurangzeb's other wives and concubines jealous of her. She gave birth to their son Prince Muhammad Kam Bakhsh on 7 March 1667. She was an alcoholic.

In 1678, she accompanied Aurangzeb to a war against the Rana of Chittor and the Raja of Marwar. In 1686, she was in Aurangabad or Ahmadnagar with Aurangzeb in his camp.

Udaipuri Mahal was an influential woman. She continued to influence Aurangzeb until his death, and it was the result of her influence that he pardoned many faults of his son Kam Bakhsh. Following the transfer of most of Aurangzeb's sons and grandsons, she continued to cultivate ties to Khidmatgar Khan, his successor Khwaja Ambar (who was also titled Khidmatgar Khan after 1704), and other imperial eunuchs.

In a letter written by Aurangzeb in 1707 on his death-bed to Kam Bakhsh, he says "Udaipuri, your mother, who has been with me during my illness, wishes to accompany [me in death]." When Aurangzeb died, she grieved deeply, and died within four months at Gwalior, in July 1707. Bahadur Shah I carried out her dying wishes with regard to her household and gave her remains for burial in a grave close to the shrine of Qutb-al Aqtab, Delhi.
