= Mughal war of succession (1707–1709) =

1707–1709 civil war in the Mughal Empire

Mughal war of succession (1707–1709) Mughal Civil War
- Part of the Decline of the Mughal Empire
Date	3 March 1707 – 14 January 1709 (1 year, 10 months, 1 week and 4 days)
Location	Mughal Empire
Result	Bahadur Shah I victory
Territorial changes	Accession to the throne of Mughal Empire

Belligerents
Bahadur Shah I	Azam Shah	Kam Bakhsh

Commanders and leaders
Bahadur Shah I Jahandar Shah; Azim-ush-Shan; Farrukh-Siyar	Azam Shah †; Bidar Bakht †	Kam Bakhsh (DOW)

The Mughal war of succession (1707–1709) or the Mughal Civil War was a period of political disorder and armed conflict over succession in the Mughal Empire following the death of the sixth Mughal emperor Aurangzeb in March 1707. His three sons fought among themselves with Bahadur Shah I being the only survivor and taking the throne.

== History ==
Emperor Aurangzeb died on 3 March 1707 in Ahmednagar after a 49-year reign without having formally declared a crown prince. His three sons Bahadur Shah I, Muhammad Azam Shah, and Muhammad Kam Bakhsh fought each other for the throne. Azam Shah declared himself successor to the throne, but was defeated in battle by Bahadur Shah. In the meantime Kam Bakhsh moved to Bijapur where he established his own empire. His forces were later engaged in battle by Bahadur Shah's army and Kam Bakhsh died of his wounds sustained in battle.

=== Principals ===
- Prince Muazzam at Jamrud along with his sons Prince Jahandar Shah, Prince Azim-ush-Shan at Bengal, Prince Rafi-ush-Shan at Malakand Fort, Prince Jahan Shah at Agra Fort, Muzzam Rule (Kabul Subah, Bengal Subah, and Malakand Fort). Consort – Nizam Bai (daughter Of Raja of Amber).
- Prince Azam Shah at Ahmednagar His sons Prince Bidar Bakht at At Gujarat, Prince Jawan Bakht At Gujarat, Prince Sikandar Along his father, Prince Wala Jah at Belapur Fort in Deccan Subah, Azam Rule (Gujarat, and Mirza Part of Deccan). Consort – Sabana Begum (daughter of Persian Ruler).
- Prince Kam Bakhsh At Bijapur with his All sons And Support by Aurangzeb queen consort Diwani Begum. Consort – Jamilat Begum (daughter of Sulan Nazir Mirza Of Bihar)

=== Conflict between Azam Shah and Bahadur Shah I ===
Aurangzeb left a will advising his sons to divide the empire among themselves. At the time of his death his eldest son Bahadur Shah I inhabited Jamrud, 12-miles west of Peshawar. His second son Muhammad Azam Shah lived in Ahmednagar. Khafi Khan suggested that whoever reached the capital city of Agra first would capture the throne. The distances to Agra from Jamrud and Ahmednagar were 715 and 700 miles, respectively.

Azam Shah and Bahadur Shah were involved in the Battle of Jajau, south of Agra, on 20 June 1707. Azam Shah and his three sons were killed in the battle and were buried with other royals in Humayun's Tomb in Delhi.

=== Conflict between Bahadur Shah and Kam Bakhsh ===
Bahadur Shah's half-brother, Muhammad Kam Bakhsh, marched to Bijapur in March 1707 with his soldiers. When the news of Aurangzeb's death spread through the city, the city's monarch, King Sayyid Niyaz Khan surrendered the fort to Baksh without a fight. Once on the throne, Kam Bakhsh proclaimed the Bakshi (general of the armed forces) Ahsan Khan. His advisor Taqarrub Khan was made chief minister. Kam Bakhsh proclaimed himself Emperor Kam Bakhsh – Protector of Faith (Padshah Kam Bakhsh-i-Dinpanah). He then conquered Kulbarga and Wakinkhera.

Taqarrub Khan formed a conspiracy to eliminate Ahsan Khan, alleging that meetings of Ahsan Khan, Saif Khan (Kam Bakhsh's archery teacher), Arsan Khan, Ahmad Khan, Nasir Khan and Rustam Dil Khan (all of them Kam Bakhsh's former teachers and members of the then court) to discuss public business were a conspiracy to assassinate Kam Bakhsh "while on his way to the Friday prayer at the great mosque". After informing Kam Bakhsh of the matter, he invited Rustam Dil Khan for dinner and had him arrested en route. Rustam Dil Khan was crushed under the feet of an elephant, Saif Khan's hands were amputated, and Arshad Khan's tongue was cut off. Ahsan Khan ignored warnings by close friends that Kam Bakhsh would arrest him, which then occurred and he was imprisoned and his property seized. In April 1708, Shah's envoy Malabar Khan came to Kam Bakhsh's court. When Taqarrub Khan told Kam Bakhsh that Malabar Khan intended to dethrone him, Kam Bakhsh invited the envoy and his entourage to a feast and executed them.

In May 1708, Bahadur Shah sent a letter to Kam Bakhsh warning that he hoped would prevent him from proclaiming himself an independent sovereign. Bahadur Shah then began a journey to the Tomb of Aurangzeb to pay his respects to his father. Kam Bakhsh replied, thanking him "without either explaining or justifying [his actions]".

When Bahadur Shah reached Hyderabad on 28 June 1708, he learned that Kam Bakhsh had attacked Machilipatnam (Bandar) in an attempt seize over three million rupees worth of treasure hidden in its fort. The subahdar of the province, Jan Sipar Khan, refused to hand over the money. Enraged, Kam Bakhsh confiscated his properties and ordered the recruitment of four thousand soldiers for the attack. In July, the garrison at the Gulbarga Fort declared its independence and garrison leader Daler Khan Bijapuri "reported his desertion from Kam Bakhsh". On 5 November 1708 Bahadur Shah's camp reached Bidar, 67 miles (108 km) north of Hyderabad. Historian William Irvine wrote that as his "camp drew nearer desertions from Kam Bakhsh became more and more frequent". On 1 November, Kam Bakhsh captured Pam Naik's (zamindar of Wakinkhera) holdings after Naik abandoned his army.

On 20 December 1708, Kam Bakhsh marched towards Talab-i-Mir Jumla, on the outskirts of Hyderabad, with "three hundred camels, [and] twenty thousand rockets" for war with Bahadur Shah. He made his son Jahandar Shah commander of the advance guard, later replacing him with Khan Zaman. On 12 January 1709, Bahadur Shah reached Hyderabad and prepared his troops. Although Kam Bakhsh had little money and few soldiers left, the royal astrologer had predicted that he would "miraculously" win the battle.

At sunrise the following day, Bahadur Shah's army charged towards Kam Bakhsh. His 15,000 troops were divided into two bodies: one led by Mumin Khan, assisted by Rafi-ush-Shan and Jahan Shah, and the second under Zulfiqar Khan Nusrat Jung. Two hours later Kam Bakhsh's camp was surrounded, and Zulfiqar Khan impatiently attacked him with his "small force".

With his soldiers outnumbered and unable to resist the attack, Kam Bakhsh joined the battle and shot two quivers of arrows at his opponents. According to Irvine, when he was "weakened by the loss of blood", Bahadur Shah took him and his son Bariqullah prisoner. A dispute arose between Mumin Khan and Zulfikar Khan Nusrat Jung over who had captured them, with Rafi-us-Shan ruling in favour of the latter. Kam Bakhsh was brought by palanquin to Bahadur Shah's camp, where he died the next morning.

== See also ==
- Mughal war of succession (1658–1659)
- Mughal war of succession (1712–1720)
