= List of Mughal grand viziers =

Grand Wazir of the Mughal Empire

Grand Vizier of Hindustan
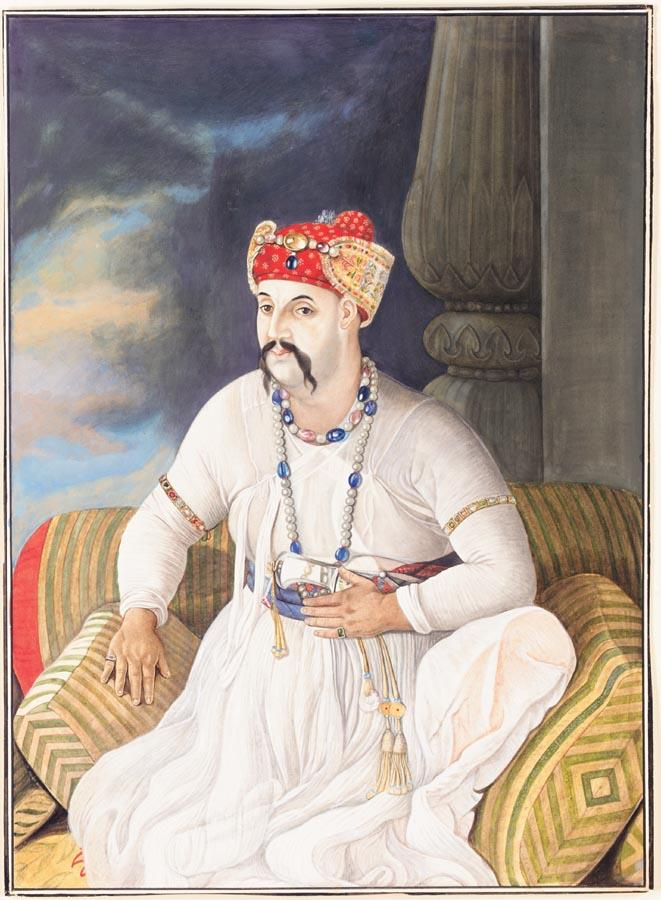
- Last to hold office Asaf-ud-Daula
- Appointer: Mughal emperor
- Formation: 21 April 1526
- First holder: Amir Nizamu-d din Khalifa
- Final holder: Asaf-ud-Daula
- Abolished: 21 September 1797

The Grand Vizier of Hindustan (Persian: Vazir-ul-Mamalik-i-Hindustan) was the highest ranking minister in the Mughal Empire and the chief adviser to the emperor himself. The position acted as the de facto head of government of the Mughal Empire and had responsibility for leading the ministers of the Empire. This is the list of grand viziers (vazīr-e azam) of the Mughal Empire.

== History ==
The seniormost official under the Mughals, or the Prime Minister, held different titles such as Vakil, Vakil-us-Sultanat, Wazir, Diwan, Diwan-i-Ala and Diwan Wazir under different Mughal emperors. Under Babur and Humayun, the institution of the wazirat was not fully developed owing to a lack of an entrenched nobility and political upheaval. Nonetheless, individuals under both rulers did rise to positions equivalent to the position of prime minister and under Humayun reforms were first attempted to clarify the roles of Vakil and Wazir.

In the early years of Akbar's reign, the position of prime minister was first officially held by Bairam Khan as Vakil-us-Sultanat, and he exercised considerable influence over the emperor. Over time the power of the Vakil gradually declined, and during the reign of his successor Jahangir the role of Wazir replaced the Vakil as the most important officer in government. Mughal wazirs were specifically appointed from the ahl-i-qalam(men of the pen) as distinct from the ahl-i-saif(men of the sword). With the abolishment of the post of Wakil, the post was divided into the two offices of Wazir and Mir Bakhshi, where the chief Wazir was the head of the finance department, while the Mir Bakhshi was the head of the military department. These two offices were made jointly responsible for the administration by a system of signatures and counter-signatures. Until the death of Aurangzeb, the post of Wazir was never a threat to the monarchy as the Wazir could not act too independently. However, after the death of Aurangzeb, the pre-mughal tradition in India of the Wazir being the premier noble at the court and leading counsellor of the king apart from being the head of the financial administration had been re-established.

== List of grand viziers ==
Portrait	Name	Term of office		Notable events	Emperor
	Mir Khalifa	21 April 1526	17 May 1540	1st Battle of Panipat Battle of Khanwa	Babur (1526 – 1530) & Humayun (1530 – 1540)
	Qaracha Khan	1540	?	He was a governor of Qandahar and Humayun appoint him as Grand-Vizier of the Mughal State.	Humayun (1530 – 1556)
	Bairam Khan	1556	March/April 1560		Akbar-i-Azam اکبر اعظم (1556-1605)
	Munim Khan	1560	1561		Akbar-i-Azam اکبر اعظم (1556-1605)
	Ataga Khan	November 1561	16 May 1562	He was assassinated by Adham Khan	Akbar-i-Azam اکبر اعظم (1556-1605)
	Munim Khan	1562	1567		Akbar-i-Azam اکبر اعظم (1556-1605)
	None	1567	1573		Akbar-i-Azam اکبر اعظم (1556-1605)
	Muzaffar Khan Turbati	1573	1579	No Vakil was appointed after his appointment to governorship in Bengal from 1579 until 1589	Akbar-i-Azam اکبر اعظم (1556-1605)
	None Todar Mal(de-facto)	1579	1589		Akbar-i-Azam اکبر اعظم (1556-1605)
	Abdul Rahim	1589	?		Akbar-i-Azam اکبر اعظم (1556-1605)
	Abu'l-Fazl	?	22 August 1602		Akbar-i-Azam اکبر اعظم (1556-1605)
	Mirza Koka	?	1605		
	Sharif Khan	1605	1611		Jahangir جہانگیر (1605-1627)
	I'timad-ud-Daula	1611	1622		Jahangir جہانگیر (1605-1627)
	Asaf Khan	1622	1627/28		Jahangir جہانگیر (1605-1627)
	Wazir Khan	1627	1628		Shah Jahan شاہ جہان (1628-1658)
	Azam Khan	1628	1628		Shah Jahan شاہ جہان (1628-1658)
	Afzal Khan	1628	1639		Shah Jahan شاہ جہان (1628-1658)
	Islam Khan	1639	1645		Shah Jahan شاہ جہان (1628-1658)
	Sa'dullah Khan	1645	1656	Taj Mahal completed	Shah Jahan شاہ جہان (1628-1658)
	Mu'azzam Khan	1656	1657		Alamgir I عالمگیر (1658-1707)
	Jafar Khan	1657	1658		Alamgir I عالمگیر (1658-1707)
	Fazil Khan	1658	1663		Alamgir I عالمگیر (1658-1707)
	Jafar Khan	1663	1670		Alamgir I عالمگیر (1658-1707)
	None (Asad Khanas deputy vizier)	1670	1675		Alamgir I عالمگیر (1658-1707)
	Asad Khan	1675	1707	Mughal–Maratha Wars; Anglo-Mughal War	Alamgir I عالمگیر (1658-1707)
	Mun'im Khan	1707	1711		Bahadur Shah I بہادر شاہ (1707-1712)
	Hidayatullah Khan	1711	1712		Jahandar Shah جہاندار شاہ (1712-1713)
	Zulfiqar Khan	1712	1713		Jahandar Shah جہاندار شاہ (1712-1713)
	Qutb-ul-Mulk	1713	1720	Mughal throne occupied by a series of puppet rulers under the Syed brothers.	Farrukhsiyar فرخ سیر (1713–1719)
	Amin Khan	1720	1721		Muhammad Shah محمد شاہ (1719-1748)
	Nizam-ul-Mulk	1721	1723		Muhammad Shah محمد شاہ (1719-1748)
Roshan-ud Daula Zafar Khan	Roshan-ud-Daula	1724	1733		Muhammad Shah محمد شاہ (1719-1748)
	Itimad-ud-Daula	1733	1748	Battle of Bhopal; Nader Shah's invasion of Mughal Empire; Battle of Karnal; First invasion of Ahmad Shah Durrani; Battle of Manupur (1748)	Muhammad Shah محمد شاہ (1719-1748)
	Shuja-ud-Daula	1748	1753	Second invasion of Ahmad Shah Durrani; Third invasion of Ahmad Shah Durrani; Battle of Lahore (1752)	Ahmad Shah Bahadur احمد شاہ بہادر (1748-1754)
	Intizam-ud-Daula	1753	1754		Ahmad Shah Bahadur احمد شاہ بہادر (1748-1754)
	Imad-ul-Mulk	1754	1760	Black Hole of Calcutta; Battle of Plassey	Alamgir II عالمگیر دوم (1754-1759)
	Shuja-ud-Daula	1761	1775	Third Battle of Panipat; Battle of Buxar; Treaty of Allahabad	Shah Alam II شاہ عالم دوم (1760-1806)
	Majad-ud-Daula Abdul Ahad Khan Kashmiri	(defacto since 1773) 1775	1779		Shah Alam II شاہ عالم دوم (1760-1806)
	Mirza Najaf Khan	1779	1782		Shah Alam II شاہ عالم دوم (1760-1806)
	Afrasiyab Khan	1782	1784		
	Mahadaji Shinde	1785	1794		
	Daulat Rao Shinde	1794	1803		

== See also ==
- Mughal emperors
- Mughal Empire
