= Battle of Jajau =

Part of Mughal war of succession (1707)

- Part of Mughal war of succession (1707)
| Date | 20 June 1707 |
| Location | Jajau, Mughal Empire (present day Uttar Pradesh, India) |
| Result | Bahadur Shah I's victory |

Belligerents
| Mughals under Bahadur Shah I; Supported by Khalsa (Sikhs) | Mughals under Azam Shah |

Commanders and leaders
| Bahadur Shah I Muhammad Azim; Aghar Khan; Khanazad Khan; Saf Shikan Khan; Jahandar Shah; Azim-ush-Shan; Farrukhsiyar; Munim Khan II; Hasan Ali Khan Barha (WIA); Husain Ali Khan Barha (WIA); Nur-ud-din Ali Khan Barha †; Mirza Namdar Lucknowi †; Sayyid Husain Khan †; Sayyid Abu Said Khan †; Inayat Khan Thaheem †; Isa Khan Manj; Supported by Guru Gobind Singh; Bhai Dharam Singh; Kuldeep Singh | Muhammad Azam Shah †; Bidar Bakht †; Alivardi Khan; Jawan Bakht †; Sikandar Shan †; Wala Jah †; Ali Tabar †; Khan Alam Dakhvini †; Munawwar Khan; Zulfikar Khan; Asad Khan; Amanullah Khan †; Rao Dalpat Bundela †; Ram Singh Hada †; Mirza Sadr-ud-din Muhammad Khan; Tarbiyat Khan †; Mutallib Khan; Salabat Khan †; Aqil Khan †; Safawi Khan Bakhshi †; Shujat Khan †; Ibrahim Khan Tabrizi; Usman Khan; Matlab Khan (WIA); Khudabanda Khan (WIA); Muhammad Bakir †; Mir Atash †; Muhammad Ishaq †; Ibrahim Khan †; Ahmad Khan †; Darya Khan †; Sayyid Abdullah †; Sherani Khan †; Abdullah Beg †; Hazrat Quli Sistani †; Dilawar Khan †; Ibrahim Beg Babari †; Ismail Khan †; Sher Afkan Khan †; Mast Ali Khan †; Mir Nayaz †; Janbaz Khan †; Tari Khan † |

Strength
| 170,000 cavalry 195,000 infantry | 90,000 cavalry 40,000 infantry |

Casualties and losses
| 10,000 soldiers | 10,000 soldiers 12,000 cavalry |
- Azam Shah was buried in Khuldabad, and his 3 sons were buried in Humayun's Tomb, Delhi

The Battle of Jajau was fought between the two Mughal princes and half-brothers Bahadur Shah I and Muhammad Azam Shah on 20 June 1707. In 1707, their father Aurangzeb died without having declared a successor; instead leaving a will in which he instructed his sons to divide the empire between themselves. Their failure to reach a satisfactory agreement led to a military conflict. After Azam Shah and his three sons were killed in the Battle of Jajau, Bahadur Shah I was crowned the Mughal emperor on 19 June 1707 at the age of 63.

== Background and preparations ==
Azam was appointed as the heir-apparent (Shahi Aali Jah) to his father on 12 August 1681 and retained that position until Aurangzeb's death. Even before Aurangzeb died, Bahadur Shah I had made preparations for a battle for the Mughal throne. With the help of Munim Khan, the naib subahdar of Lahore, he gathered troops from local rulers in Beas and Satluj. He had built bridges and improved the roads between Lahore and Peshawar. He was also successful in persuading Rao Budh Singh (the king of Bundi) and Bijai Singh of Kachhwa to send their soldiers to him.

After a 49-year reign, the Mughal emperor Aurangzeb died in 1707. He left a will advising his sons to divide the empire between themselves. At the time of Aurangzeb's death, his eldest son, Bahadur Shah I, was stationed at Jamrud, 12 miles west of Peshawar. The next morning, Azam who had tarried outside Ahmednagar instead of proceeding to Malwa, arrived at the imperial camp and conveyed his father's body for burial at his tomb at Daulatabad. With the distance between Jamrud and Agra being 715 miles and the distance between Ahmednagar and Agra being 700 miles, whoever reached the capital city of Agra first would capture the Mughal throne.

On 20 May Bahadur Shah called upon Guru Gobind Singh to join him in the battle. The Guru agreed and sent Kuldeep Singh as a liaison officer. The Guru further sent 200 - 300 men under Bhai Dharam Singh.

With his children, Khujista Akhtar and Rafi-ush-Shan, Bahadur Shah reached Lahore and declared himself the Mughal ruler on 3 May 1707. After taking 28 lakh rupees, he left the city on 5 May 1707. By 1 June, he reached Delhi. Reaching the city, he visited the Nizamuddin Dargah and the shrine of Qutbuddin Bakhtiar Kaki. From the Red Fort, he took 30 lakh rupees, and on 3 June, he resumed his journey. By 12 June, he had reached Agra and camped in Poyah Ghat on the outskirts of the city. Baqi Khan Qul, commandant of the Agra Fort, surrendered the fort to Munim Khan, who subsequently sealed the treasury.

Bahadur Shah sent a letter to Azam Shah asking him to be content with Southern India, the part of India which had been willed to him by their father Aurangzeb. He also wrote that, if he was not happy with his part, then he was ready to give him the territories of Gujarat and Ajmer. He added that, if Azam Shah was not satisfied with this offer, he would have to use the "sword to decide" the monarch of the empire. In his reply, Azam wrote:

My share is from the floor to the roof of the house. Yours is from the roof to the firmament.

== Conflict ==
Realising that a battle could not be avoided, Bahadur Shah I marched towards Agra, having decided to fight a battle at Dholpur (34 miles from the city). Under his command, prince Azim-ush-Shan was dispatched with 80,000 horsemen, with 11 crore rupees that he had collected from Bengal, where he was the governor. He was ordered to capture the forts in Chambal (one mile from Dholpur).

As soon as Azam Shah heard that Bahadur Shah I had started preparing for a march towards Agra, he left the fort of Gwalior in charge of the wazir, Asad Khan. He crossed the Chambal at the Kamthra crossing and made for Dholpur. He made his son, Bidar Bakht, the commander of the vanguard of the troops. Leading 25,000 horsemen, he was accompanied by his brother, Mirza Wala-Jah, and other Rajput chiefs. When they neared Dholpur, Azam Shah made Bakht the commander of a further 65,000 horsemen and 40,000 infantry. The army was divided into four branches commanded by Bidar Bakht, Azam Shah himself, and his sons Ali Tabar and Wala Jah. Though the army did not have "large cannons" and "mortars", it possessed camel-guns and elephant-guns. Azam Shah was of the opinion that "an artillery fight was a stripling's pastime and the only real weapon was the sword".

On 17 June, Azam Shah and his battalion reached Mania near Dholpur. After this intelligence reached him, Bahadur Shah I reached Jajau and camped four miles from the city on 18 June. Taking advice from astrologers, he decided to strike on 20 June.

To collect water, on 20 June, Bidar Bakht and his men headed towards Jajau without knowing that Bahadur Shah was camped there. He came across a village where he found a flowing stream of water. To inform Azam Shah, he sent his messenger, Iradat Khan, to him with the message. When he returned, he informed Bidar Bakht that he had seen Bahadur Shah's advance tents. Khan Alam Dakhvini and Munavvar Khan, who were in charge of the central wing of the troops, were dispatched to attack the tents. Azim-ush-Shan's 500 elephants failed to mount a resistance against the invading forces. The attackers looted the tents and then set them on fire.

Unable to put up a strong fight, Azim-ush-Shan wrote to Bahadur Shah for reinforcements. He responded by sending Munim Khan and Jahandar Shah. Meanwhile, Zulfikar Khan, who was in charge of the left wing of Azam Shah's army, advised him to wait until the next day to start a full-fledged battle. However, Shah paid no heed. Seeing 50,000 horsemen approaching, Iradat Khan informed Azam Shah about their advance. In reply, he said that he was "coming to his son".

Bidar Bakht found it difficult to mobilise all of his men to fight since they were "scattered to plunder camp". The attacking force started raining arrows on them and discharging rockets at them. Khan Alam Dakhini charged Bahadur Shah's army with three hundred soldiers. He threw a spear towards Azim-ush-Shan seated in the howdah of the elephant. It missed him and instead hit his attendant, Jalal Khan. Dakhini was killed by an arrow as he attempted to jump on the prince's howdah. Jalal Khan boarded a separate elephant, and after he inflicted an injury on Munavvar Khan, Munavvar Khan's soldiers fled. This exposed the wing of Prince Wala-Jah. Seeing this, Amanullah Khan, who was in charge of a separate wing, hastened to render assistance. But his elephant was set on fire, and his troops fled, thinking that their leader was dead. This made Wala-Jah retreat from the battle.

After this confrontation, Bahadur Shah's Rajput chiefs attacked Zulfikar Khan. Though Khan's army was successful in repelling them, he was wounded in the leg. As Azim-ush-Shan's entire army charged Khan, he fled the battle. Khan was followed by Jai Singh Kchwa, who fled from Bidar Bakht's left wing. Even after the death of most of his commanders and soldiers and his two sons, Bidar Bakht and Ali Tabar, Azam Shah himself charged the enemy on his elephant. Court historian Kamraj, in Ibratnama, wrote that he was wounded "several times by arrows, but he paid no heed to the wounds". He was ultimately killed by a musket ball which struck him on his forehead, according to Mughal sources, it was Isa Khan Main, a zamindar who belonged to the Lakhi Jangal of Subah Lahore and was at the point of time serving with the troops of Prince Muizz-ud-din had killed Azam Shah.Sikh accounts state that Guru Gobind Singh killed Azam Shah with an arrow.

As soon as Bahadur Shah learned of his brother's death, he sent men to retrieve the corpse. They were attacked by Wala-Jah, but Wala-Jah fainted and died. Around 8 o'clock in the evening, Bahadur Shah's aide, Rustam Dil Khan, mounted the dead prince's elephant, beheaded the prince, and made his way to Bahadur Shah. However, instead of praises, he received reproaches for his action. His elephant was followed by two other elephants; the first one contained the dead body of Ali Tabar, the other one carried the dead prince's women, who were assured protection by Bahadur Shah.

== Aftermath ==
The Ibratnama estimates that 12,000 horsemen of Azam Shah lay dead on the battlefield. It further estimates that at least 10,000 infantry soldiers from both sides were dead. Khan Zaman and Khan Alam Dakhini's bodies were sent to Gwalior for burial. Ram Singh Hada and Rao Dalpat Bundela's bodies were sent to Nurabad for cremation. Azam Shah and his three dead sons were buried at Humayun's Tomb in Delhi.
