= Viceroy of the Deccan =

Mughal imperial official (1636–1724)

Mughal Empire Deccan Subah
- 1636–1724
- Status: Administrative division of the Mughal Empire
- Official languages: Persian; Hindustani
- Common languages: Telugu; Hindustani; Marathi; Kannada; Tamil; Konkani; Malayalam
- Government: Mughal provincial government
- History
  - Established: 1636
  - Hyderabad State became independent: 1724
Preceded by	Succeeded by
Deccan sultanates	Hyderabad State
- Today part of: India

Viceroy of the Deccan was the representative of the Mughal emperors in Deccan. Deccan consisted of six Mughal governorates (Subah): Khandesh, Bijapur, Berar, Aurangabad (currently known as Chhatrapati Sambhaji Nagar), Hyderabad and Bidar. Carnatic region was a subdivision which was partly administered by the governor of Bijapur and Hyderabad.

The domain of Viceroy of the Deccan extends from the Narmada River in the North to Trichinopoly in the South and Masulipatnam in the east to Bijapur in the west. Aurangabad was selected as the viceregal capital of Deccan where Aurangzeb resided until his death in 1707 AD, and the Asaf Jah I ruled from the very place until 1750 AD, when his capital was shifted to Hyderabad city and the domain of Viceroy of Deccan was renamed as Hyderabad Deccan.

== History ==
In 1636, Shah Jahan appointed Aurangzeb as the Viceroy of the Deccan.
