= Bakhshi (Mughal Empire) =

Military and intelligence official in the Mughal Empire

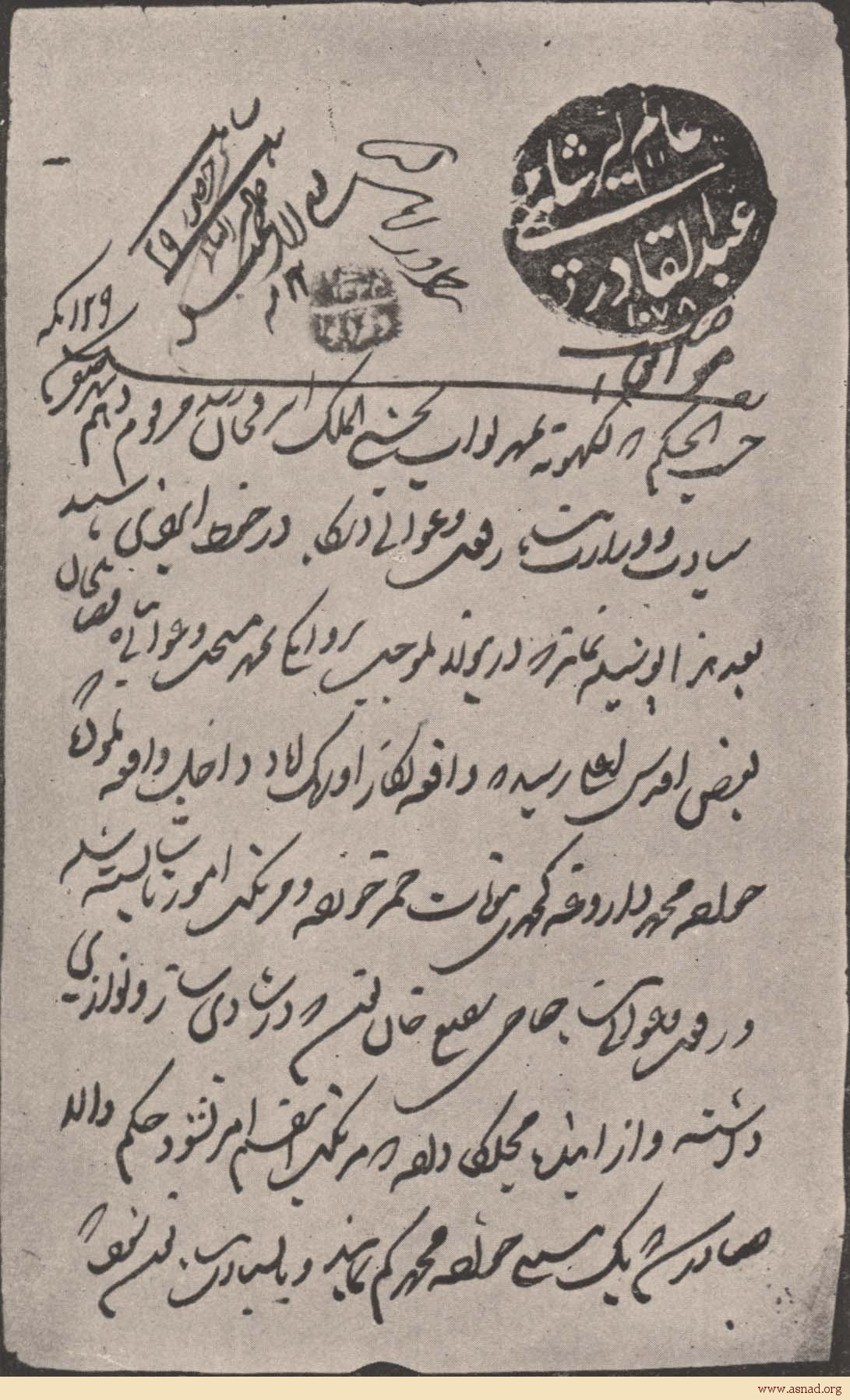
Farman bearing the seal of a bakhshi, documenting the reduction in mansab (rank) of an officer, on account of misbehavior (c. 1686, reign of Aurangzeb)

The Bakhshi (lit. 'Giver') in the Mughal Empire denoted a number of hierarchical government officials, typically involved with military administration and intelligence. The offices were introduced during the reign of Mughal emperor Akbar. Bakhshis were found in both the central and provincial administration; the most notable kind of bakhshi was the mir bakhshi, one of the empire's four ministers, broadly in charge of administering the mansabdari system (and the military therein). The mir bakhshi was the second-highest official in the Mughal Empire, after the imperial wazir.

== List of Mughal Mir Bakshis ==
List of Mughal Mir Bakshis
Mir Bakshi	Emperor (Reign)	Approximate Period
Shahbaz Khan Kamboh	Akbar (1556–1605)	1572–1581
Shaikh Farid Bukhari (Farid Murtaza Khan)	Akbar (1556–1605)	1600–1605
Ruhullah Khan	Aurangzeb (1658–1707)	1686–1692
Bahramand Khan	Aurangzeb (1658–1707)	1692–1702
Zulfiqar Khan Nusrat Jung (son of Asad Khan)	Aurangzeb (1658–1707)	1702–1712
Khan Dowran VII	Muhammad Shah (1719–1748)	8 October 1720 – 24 February 1739
Ghulam Kadir	Shah Alam II (1760–1788; 1788–1806)	5 September 1787 – 18 July 1788

== Etymology ==
The term bakhshi means 'giver', deriving from the verb bakhshidan (Persian: بخشيدن, lit. 'to bestow'). In the view of historian William Irvine, the term refers to the bakhshi's function of offering recruitment into the army.

== Central administration ==
=== Mir Bakhshi ===
The mir bakhshi was the chief bakhshi of the Mughal Empire, and worked in the central administration. The position was also referred to as bakhshi-ul-mamalik or bakhshi-i-mamalik. Scholars have translated the office in English as 'paymaster general' or 'army minister'. The position has its roots at latest in the Delhi Sultanate, during the 13th-century reign of Balban, who created the office of diwan-i-arz in order to have a separated military administration; this was to act as a check against the vizier. The Mughal emperor Akbar constituted an office with a similar goal of having a separate military administrator, but in contrast ensured that this official would not actually command the military (that was reserved for the emperor himself). Rather, the mir bakhshi was made responsible for the management of the mansabdari system, which constituted the bulk of the military. Unlike the Sultanate-era office, the mir bakhshi's influence extended beyond the military, since every noble of the Mughal empire was a mansabdar. The Ain-i-Akbari contains references to an office termed mir-arz, which William Irvine considered to be the immediate prototype for the position of mir bakhshi.

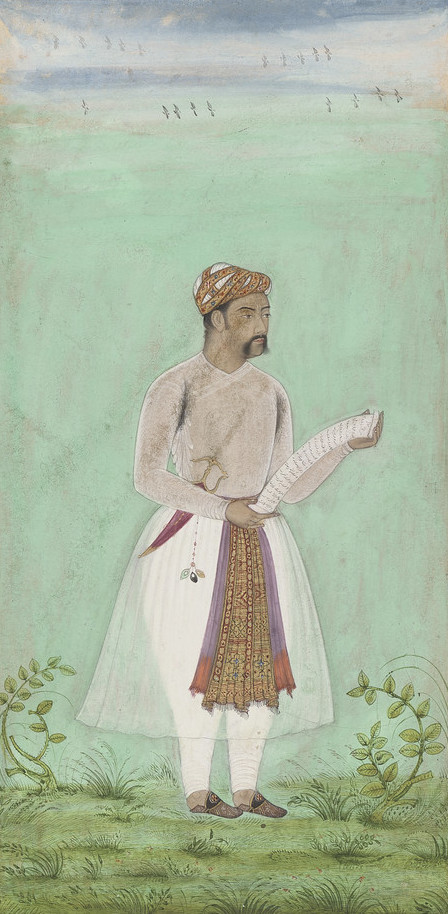
Portrait of Shaikh Farid Bukhari, a mir bakhshi of Akbar's reign

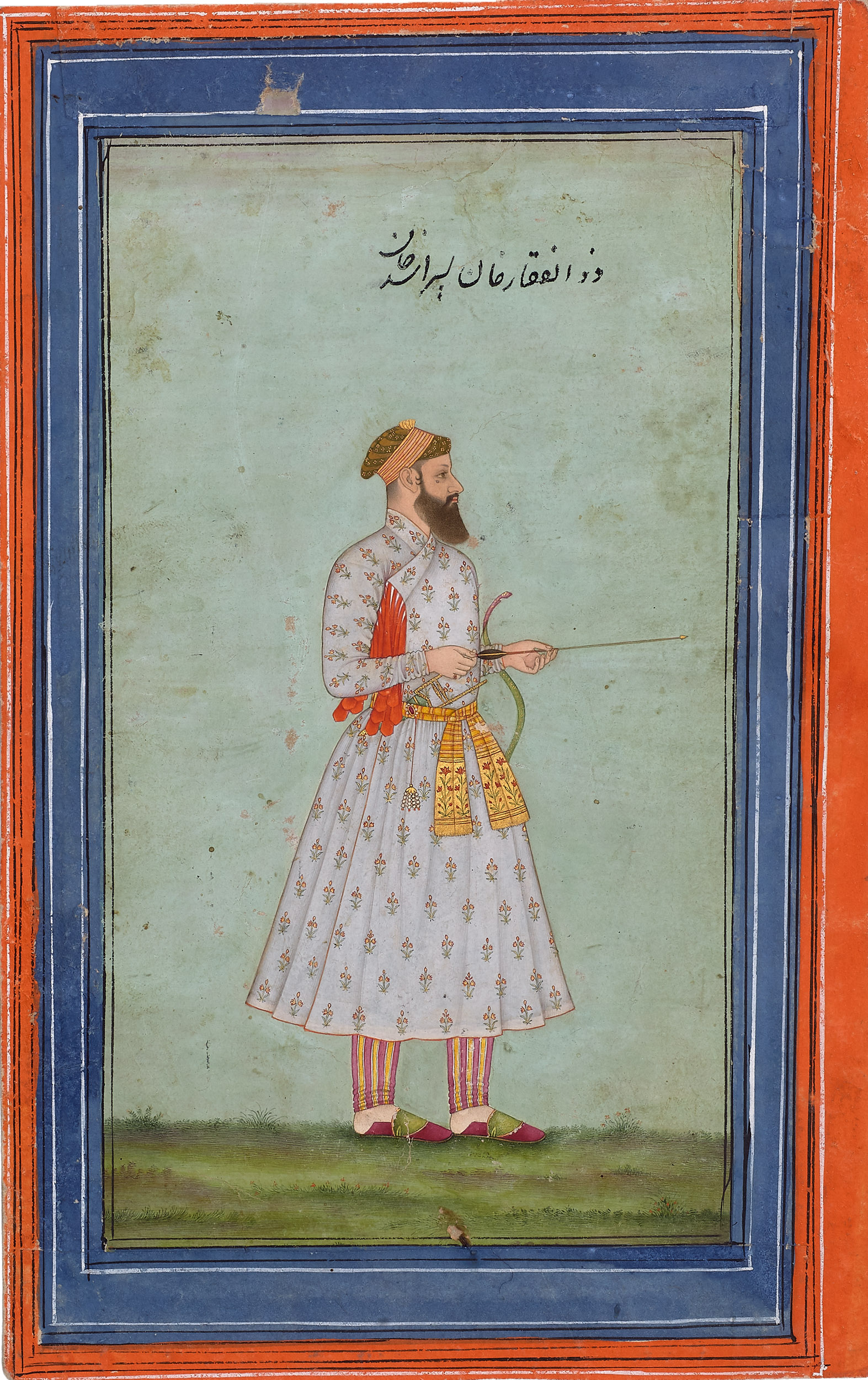
Portrait of Zulfiqar Khan, mir bakhshi during the reigns of Aurangzeb and Bahadur Shah I

As the chief military administrator of the Mughal Empire, the mir bakhshi was one of the empire's four top ministers, and the second-highest official in the empire after the wazir. The chief responsibilities of the mir bakhshi were in the management of mansabdars; to recruit them, recommend a suitable rank to assign them, regularly inspect their military units, and determine their payment (either in the form of cash or jagirs). Candidates for appointment or promotion were presented by the mir bakhshi to the emperor, in open court. The mir bakhshi's seal endorsed the candidate's new position. The mir bakhshi occasionally participated in the field as commanders.

The mir bakhshi occupied a close position to the emperor. They stood by the emperor in court, and accompanied him on royal expeditions. They presented officials of the state, and visiting ambassadors, to the emperor. Another important function of the mir bakhshi was the centralisation of intelligence - they collated information reported by the waqia-navis (news writers, posted in every province) and presented it to the emperor. The mir bakhshi of the Mughal Empire frequently bore the title of Amir al-umara.

The roles of the mir bakhshi acted as checks and support for the wazir of the Mughal Empire, alongside whom the mir bakhshi served as one of the empire's leading officials.

=== Second and Third Bakhshi ===
The mir bakhshi was assisted in the central administration by two lesser bakhshis, known as the second and third bakhshis. These officials performed similar tasks to the mir bakhshi, but dealt with lesser mansabdars and troops of the royal household.

== Provincial and noble administration ==
The administrative positions of the Mughal central government were mirrored at the provincial level. Each subah (province) had its own bakhshi (a practice introduced by Akbar) who reported to the mir bakhshi at the capital, rather than the subahdar (governor) of the province. Similar to their imperial counterparts, the provincial bakhshi was charged with the management and payment of the province's military. The provincial bakhshi often simultaneously served the function of the province's waqia-navis (news writer), and reported on all provincial mansabdars, including its senior officials (such as the subahdar or diwan).The role of provincial bakhshi could face tension from the subahdar or diwan, since the bakhshi's activities kept these officials accountable to the imperial centre. In practice, the role of the provincial bakhshi was sometimes combined with that of the subahdar and/or the diwan.

Significant nobles of the empire also had their own bakhshis, who performed functions similar to those at the imperial level.

== See also ==
- Government of the Mughal Empire
- Army of the Mughal Empire
- Subah
