= Muhammad Kam Bakhsh =

Mughal prince (1667–1709)

Kam Bakhsh کام بخش
- Shahzada of the Mughal Empire; Mirza
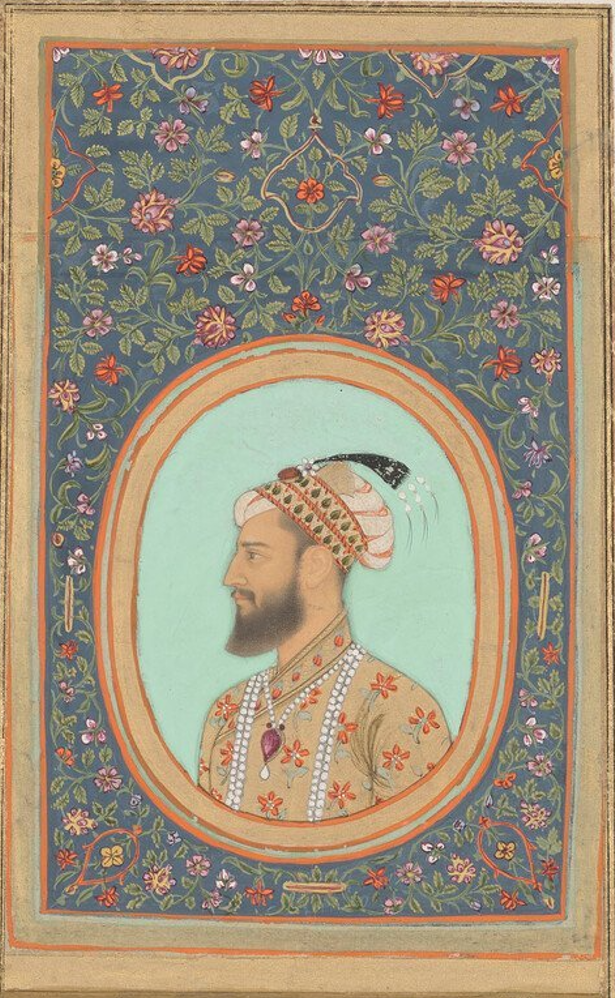
- Prince Kam Bakhsh, c. 1700

Ruler of Bijapur
- Reign: March 1707 – 14 January 1709
- Born: 6 March 1667; Delhi, Mughal Empire
- Died: 14 January 1709 (aged 41); Hyderabad, Mughal Empire
- Burial: 23 January 1709; Humayun's Tomb, Delhi
- Spouse: Fakhr Jahan Khanam (m. 1681); Azarm Banu Begum (m. 1683)
- Issue: Umed Bakhsh Mirza; Muhi us-Sunnat Mirza; Firuzmand Mirza; Barqiullah Mirza; Hayat-un-Nissa Begum
Names
- Mirza Muhammad Kam Bakhsh
- House: Mughal dynasty
- Dynasty: Timurid dynasty
- Father: Aurangzeb
- Mother: Udaipuri Mahal
- Religion: Sunni Islam

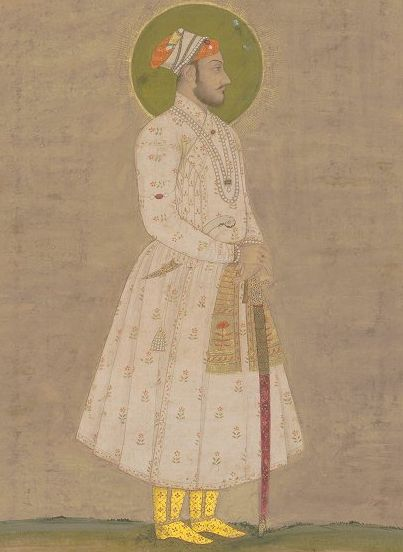
Portrait of Kam Baksh

Mirza Muhammad Kam Bakhsh (Persian: محمد کامبخش; 7 March 1667 – 14 January 1709) was the youngest son of Mughal emperor Aurangzeb, born to his wife Udaipuri Mahal.

== Early life ==
Kam Bakhsh was born on 7 March 1667 at Delhi. He was the fifth son of sixth Mughal emperor Aurangzeb through his wife, Udaipuri Mahal. He was circumcised on 23 March 1673.

On 2 February 1681, he married Fakhr Jahan Khanam, daughter of Barkhurdar Beg, a mansabdar.

His second wife was Azarm Banu Begum, daughter of Muazzam Sayadat Khan, whom he married on 14 March 1683. Khidmatgar Khan conveyed to the Prince's house a special robe with half sleeves woven with pearls, and Khidmat Khan jewels worth rupees two lakhs and 26,000 rupees. Cash of five lakh rupees, two Arab and Iraqi horses, and an elephant were presented to Aurangzeb. The knot was tied in the mosque in the presence of the Qazi Shaikh-ul-Islam. A grand and joyous festivity marked the occasion. She died at Delhi on 13 February 1745.

His sons were Umaid Bakhsh Mirza, Muhammad Muhi-us-Sunnat Mirza, Muhammad Firuzmand Mirza, and Bariqu'llah Mirza. He also a daughter, Hayat-un-Nissa Begum, who was married on 20 November 1709 to Muhammad Karim Mirza, son of Azim-ush-Shan Mirza. She died at Delhi on 14 December 1745.

== Ruler of Bijapur ==
=== Civil war in court ===
After Aurangzeb's death, Kam Bakhsh marched towards Bijapur in March 1707 with his soldiers. When the news of his death spread through the city, the ruler Sayyid Niyaz Khan surrendered the fort to him. Upon ascending the throne, he made Ahsan Khan the bakshi or the chief general with the post of chief minister going to Taqarrub Khan. He also gave himself the title of Padshah Kam Bakhsh-i-Dinpanah (Emperor Kam Bakhsh, Protector of Faith). He went on to conquer Gulbarga and Wakinkhera.

In the meantime, a conflict arose among Taqarrub Khan and Ahsan Khan. Ahsan Khan had created a market place in Bijapur where he took the decision of not levying tax on shops, without taking the permission of Kam Bakhsh. Taqarrub Khan reported it to him, who ordered this practise to be stopped. In May of the same year, Ahsan Khan was sent by Kam Bakhsh to conquer the states of Golconda and Hyderabad. The ruler of Golconda refused to surrender but the subahdar of Hyderabad, Rustam Dil Khan agreed to give his province to him.

Envious of the progress of Ahsan Khan, Taqarrub Khan decided to suppress him. He joined hands with Sayyid Ahmed for the cause. He purposely misinterpreted the private meetings of Ahsan Khan, Saif Khan (the archery teacher of Kam Bakhsh), Arsan Khan, Ahmad Khan and Nasir Khan along with Rustam Dil Khan to discuss public business as finding a way to kill Kam Bakhsh. Taqarrub Khan said him that they would assassinate him "while on his way to the Friday prayer at the great mosque". He called Rustam Dil Khan for dinner, and while he came, the royal soldiers arrested him, and he was killed by crushing him under the feet of an elephant. Saif Khan's hands were amputated and Arshad Khan's tongue was cut off as punishment. In spite of his close mates warning him of Kam Bakhsh arresting him, Ahsan Khan paid no heed to it. But he was also put in custody and his goods were confiscated. In April 1708, Shah's envoy, Maktabar Khan came to his court. Taqarrub Khan said to him that his original intention was to dethrone him. So Kam Bakhsh, called him and his entourage in a feast, where he asked his men to execute them.

=== Bahadur Shah marches to South ===
After ascending the throne by defeating Muhammad Azam Shah at the battle of Jajau in 1707, Bahadur Shah I ascended the throne. In May 1708, Shah wrote a letter to Kam Bakhsh informing him of the happenings. Shah I thought that this incident would "be a warning" to him, so that he could not declare himself an independent sovereign. In that same month, he started his journey for the Tomb of Aurangzeb to pay respect to the departed emperor. In reply he wrote a letter thanking him "without either explaining or justifying it".

When Shah reached Hyderabad on 28 June 1708, he received the news of Kam Bakhsh attacking Machhlibandar. Actually, there were thirty-two lakhs of treasure hidden in the fort which he wanted to seize for further campaigns. The subahdar of the province Jan Sipar Khan refused to hand over the money. Enraged by the refusal, he confiscated the property and ordered that four thousand men to be recruited for the attack. In the following month, the garrison of the Gulbarga fort revolted against him and declared themselves to be free. The leader of the garrison Daler Khan Bijapuri "reported his desertion from Kam Bakhsh". On 5 November 1708, Shah's camp reached Bidar which is 67 miles north from Hyderabad. Historian William Irvine writes that as his "camp drew nearer desertions from Kam Bakhsh became more and more frequent". On 1 November Kam Bakhsh captured Pam Naik's (the zamindar of Wakinkhera) belongings after he had left his army.

Irvine writes that as more and more soldiers left his service as Shah's camp was coming nearer. When his general informed him that the non-payment of salary to his soldiers was responsible for the soldiers deserting him, he replied that: "What need have I of enlisting them? My trust is in God, and whatever is best will happen."

Shah thought that in such a bankrupt condition, Kam Bakhsh might flee to Persia. On his orders, the Mughal prime minister Zulfikar Khan signed a pact with a certain Mr.Pitt, the governor of Madras that he would be paid two lakh rupees if he could capture Kam Bakhsh, in case he tries to flee. Records show that on 20 December, he had twenty five hundred cavalry and five thousand infantry.

== War against Bahadur Shah and death ==
On 20 December 1708, Kam Bakhsh marched towards Talab-i-Mir Jumla, on the outskirts Hyderabad with "three hundred camels, twenty thousand rockets" for the war against Bahadur Shah I. Shah made his son Jahandar Shah the commander of the vanguard, but was replaced by Khan Zaman. On 12 January 1709, Shah finally reached Hyderabad and set up his tent training his troops. With little money and soldiers left, Kam Bakhsh was sure of his victory due to the foretelling of the royal astrologer who predicted that he would "miraculously" win the battle.

On 13 January, Shah's army charged towards him. The troops were divided in two bodies – one was under the commandant of Mumin Khan and was assisted by Rafi-ush-Shan and Jahan Shah and the second under Zulfikar Khan. There were an estimation of fifteen thousand soldiers in Shah's army. After two hours from sunrise, the emperor's troops surrounded Kam Bakhsh's camp. Being impatient, Khan attacked him with his "small force".

With his soldiers being outnumbered and unable to resist the attack, Kam Bakhsh himself started shooting arrows at the enemy, finishing two quiverfuls of arrows. Irvine writes that when he was "weakened by loss of blood" the opposition surrounded him and took him and his son Bariqullah as prisoners. However a dispute rose among Mumin Khan and Zulfikar Khan about who had actually captured him. Rafi-us-Shan solved the matter by attributing it to the latter.

He was taken by a palanquin to Shah's camp where he was made to rest on a bed. Shah went to his bedside and said "I had no desire to see you reduced to this state". Shah himself also washed the wounds from his body and replaced his blood stained clothes, besides forcing him to take "few spoonfuls of food". The next morning on 14 January 1709, Kam Bakhsh died. After ten days, his body was sent to Delhi for burial, and was hence buried in Humayun's Tomb.

== In popular culture ==
=== Films and television ===
- In the 2017 Indian historical Peshwa Bajirao (TV series), he is portrayed by Sumit Kaul .

== Bibliography ==
- Irvine, William. The Later Mughals. Low Price Publications. ISBN 8175364068.
- Sarkar, Jadunath (1947). Maasir-i-Alamgiri: A History of Emperor Aurangzib-Alamgir (reign 1658-1707 AD) of Saqi Mustad Khan. Royal Asiatic Society of Bengal, Calcutta.
