= Barha =

Barha may refer to:

- Barha Dynasty, royal Indian muslim dynasty of sayyid origin
- Sadaat-e-Bara, tribe of Indian muslim sayyids
- Sayyid Brothers, the de-facto rulers of the Mughal Empire during the early 18th century
  - Sayyid Hassan Ali Khan Barha (1666–1722)
  - Sayyid Hussain Ali Khan Barha (1666-1720)
- Sayyid Abdullah Khan I, a loyal serviceman and military commander of Mughal Emperor Aurangzeb, also the father of the Sayyid brothers
- Saif Khan Barha, a favorite of the Mughal Emperor Jahangir
- Sayyed Mahmud Khan, a high ranking general and nobleman in the Mughal Empire during the 16th century

== See also ==
Bahra (disambiguation)
