= Qasim Khan Barha and Hashim Khan Barha =

Military commanders

Amir Hashim & Qasim Khan Barha
- Died: Qasim - 1598 CE; Hashim Khan - Ahmedabad
- Cause of death: Hashim Khan - Killed in action Qasim Khan - Dyspepsia
- Burial place: Hashim Khan - Hashimpur , Muzaffarnagar; Qasim Khan - Naya Gaon, Muzaffarnagar
- Children: Qasim Khan - Sulaiman , Aadam , Mubarak , Abdullah; Hashim Khan - Sayyid Bayazid
- Relatives: Father - Sayyed Mahmud Khan
- Military career
- Allegiance: Mughal Empire
- Branch: Mughal Army
- Service years: Qasim Khan - 1572 CE to 1598 CE; Hashim Khan - 1576 CE – c. 1583 CE
- Rank: Hashim Khan - 1000 Zat; Qasim Khan - 2000 Zat
- Conflicts: Battle of Haldighati; Crushing of Chandrasen Rathore; Crushing of Muzaffar Shah III; Murad Mirza's Campaigns in Deccan

Qasim Khan Barha and Hashim Khan Barha were Mughal military commanders during the reign of Akbar. They were among the six sons of Amir Mahmud Khan Barha, a high-ranking noble who held a mansab of 4000 zat. The family belonged to the Kundliwal clan, one of the four principal clans of the Barha Sayyids (Sadaat-e-Barha), who held a recognized hereditary role in leading the vanguard of Mughal armies.

Both brothers were active participants in several imperial campaigns in Rajputana, Gujarat, and the Deccan, and were consistently deployed in forward positions in accordance with the military traditions of the Barha Sayyids.

== Military career ==
The earliest recorded activity of Qasim Khan dates to the 17th regnal year of Akbar (1572 CE), when he was deputed with Khan Alam in pursuit of Muhammad Husain Mirza, who had fled toward the Deccan after his defeat by Khan-i-Azam Koka.

Hashim Khan came into prominence during the campaign against Sultan Deorah Rathore, the ruler of Sirohi, who had rebelled against Mughal authority. He was sent along with Rai Rai Singh for the expedition and is noted for his service in the subsequent Mughal conquest of Sirohi.

Hashim Khan also took part in the Battle of Haldighati, where he led the vanguard of the Mughal army alongside his uncle Ahmad Khan Barha, who commanded the right wing. During the battle, Hashim Khan was wounded in action.

In the 22nd regnal year of Akbar, both Qasim and Hashim were deputed with Shahbaz Khan in operations against Maharana Pratap. In the 25th year, they were assigned to act against Chandar Sen Rathore, whose activities had drawn imperial attention. The brothers, who held jagirs in Ajmer, engaged him in conflict and eventually forced him into a state of displacement.

In the 28th regnal year, they were appointed under Mirza Khan (Khan-i-Khanan) in the campaign against Muzaffar Shah III of Gujarat. Upon reaching the environs of Ahmedabad, both brothers served in the vanguard during the ensuing conflict, in keeping with the established role of the Barha Sayyids in Mughal military organization.

During the Battle of Sakrich (near Ahmedabad), Hashim Khan was killed in action while holding a mansab of 1000 zat. Qasim Khan was also wounded in the same engagement. Following the battle, he was entrusted with responsibilities in the defense of Ahmedabad and later made the Governor of Patan, and was appointed to command forces in the province during the absence of Mirza Khan as the command of entire Mughal forces in the province fell on Qasim. He further led campaigns against Amin Khan Ghori.

Qasim Khan subsequently conducted several military operations against Muzaffar Shah III, as well as against local chiefs, including the Jam of Kutch and Khangar, a zamindar of the region.

In the 37th regnal year of Akbar, he served in the vanguard during Battle of Bhuchar Mori between Khan-i-Azam Koka and Muzaffar Shah III. He later accompanied Prince Murad to the Deccan, where he commanded the left wing of the Mughal forces in battle.

== Death and legacy ==
Hashim Khan Barha died during the Battle of Sarkrich while holding a mansab of 1000 zat. He is associated with the establishment of Hashimpur village in present-day Muzaffarnagar district, where his tomb is located. The village derives its name from him.

He had one son, Sayyid Bayazid. From this line descended his grandson Sultan, who received the titles Salaabat Khan and Ikhtisas Khan, and attained a mansab of 2000 zat. His descendants continue to reside in Hashimpur.

Qasim Khan Barha died in 1599 CE (44th regnal year) from dyspepsia. At the time of his death, he held a mansab of 2000 zat, placing him among the higher-ranking nobles.

He had five sons:

- Sulaiman
- Adam
- Mubarak
- Abdullah (also known as Saif Khan)
- Sher Ali (who held the title Salaabat Khan)

Among them, Abdullah’s line continued to reside in the ancestral seat of the Kundliwal clan at Mujhera, while the other four sons and their descendants migrated to the Mawana region of present-day Meerut district, where they held control over 21 villages.

== See also ==
- Sayyid brothers
- Barha family
- Sayyed Mahmud Khan Barha
- Abdullah Khan Barha
- Hassan Ali Khan Barha
- Hussain Ali Khan Barha
- Saif Khan Barha
