= Muazzamabadi Mahal =

Consort of Mughal Emperor Jahandar Shah

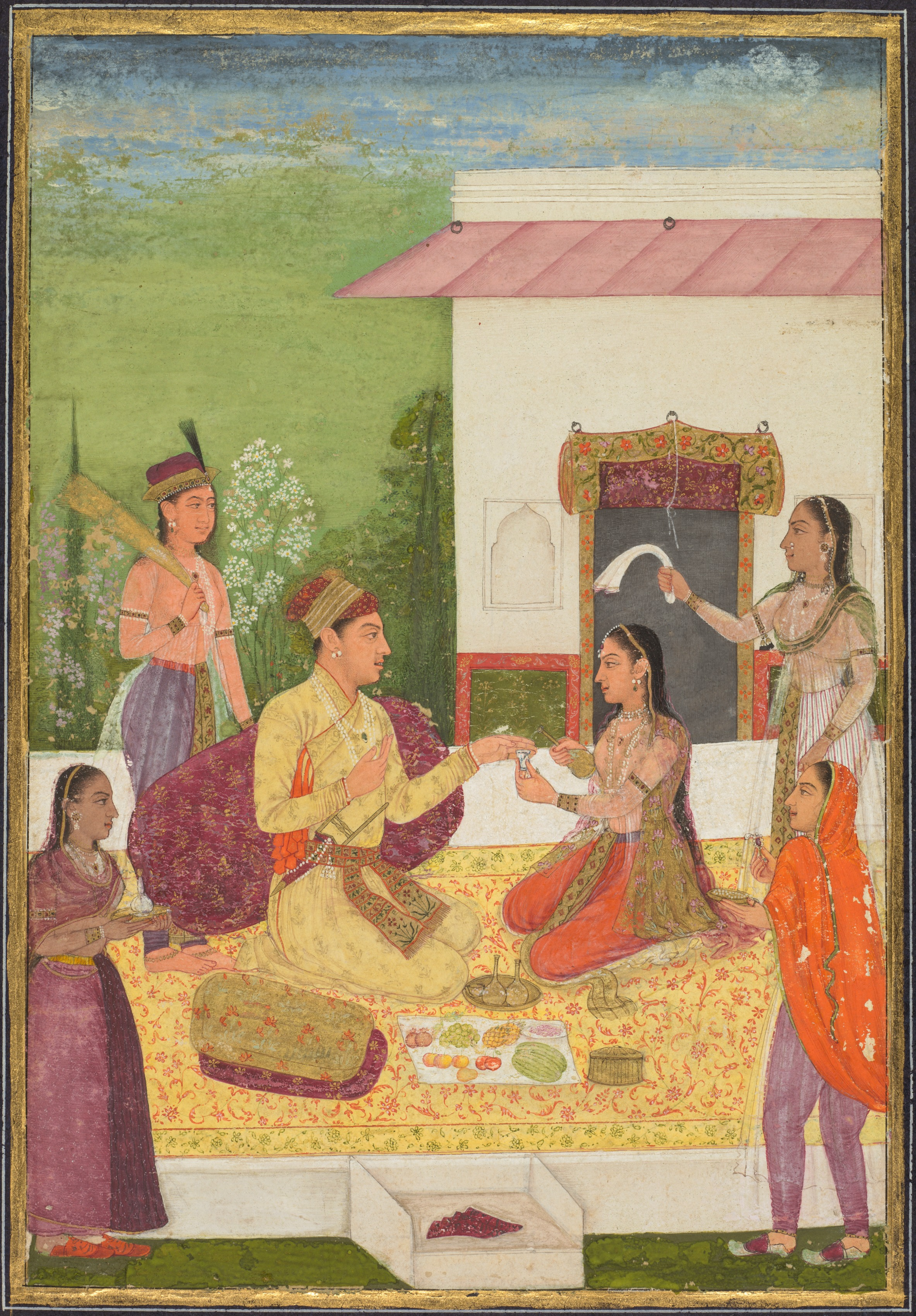
- Prince Mu'iz-ud-Din (Jahandar Shah) drinking and conversing with a lady of the harem, likely Anup Bai c.1705
- Born: Anup Bai; Rajputana or Gorakhpur, Mughal Empire
- Died: 17, April 1735, Delhi, Mughal Empire
- Spouse: | Jahandar Shah (m. 1698)
- Issue: Alamgir II (disputed)

Muazzamabadi Mahal was a consort of the 9th Mughal emperor Jahandar Shah. She was the mother of Alamgir II.

== Background ==
Muazzamabadi Mahal was born as Anup Bai and was a Rajput princess by birth, though her clan is unknown. As the rule established centuries earlier by Emperor Akbar stated; the names of the women who entered the imperial harem were not to be known to the public, and should be designated an epithet according to the place of their birth or where they lived prior to entering the palace. This places her as being from (or having lived in) the city of Gorakhpur, then known as Muazzamabad. As for her clan, she might have been from any of the prominent Rajput clans, such as the Kachwaha, Hada Chauhan, and Rathore.

== Life ==
She entered the palace as the third consort of Jahandar Shah, and was his only other legally wedded wife, as the emperor was more fond of his concubines (namely Lal Kunwar). Anup Bai was said to have "for a while, became the partner in the prince's pleasures". She was notably fond of diamonds, pearls, rubies and other precious jewels of the finest quality which she would have brought to her from Gujarat and Kashmir. Her husband's reign was short-lived and he was essentially a puppet ruler placed on the throne by Zulfiqar Khan. During the reign of Muhammad Shah and the subsequent power struggle in the harem among Badshah Begum, Sahiba Mahal, and Qudsia Begum, she likely assumed a relatively inactive role, as not much is documented about her during this time.

On 6 June 1699, she gave birth to Prince Aziz-ud-Din at Burhanpur, who would go on to become the fifteenth Mughal emperor Alamgir II ruling from 1754 to 1759. Anup Bai died on 17 April 1735, long before her son ascended the throne.
