= Azz-ud-din Mirza =

Mughal prince (1691–1744)

Mirza Azz-ud-Din عزالدین مرزا
- Shahzada of the Mughal Empire; Mirza
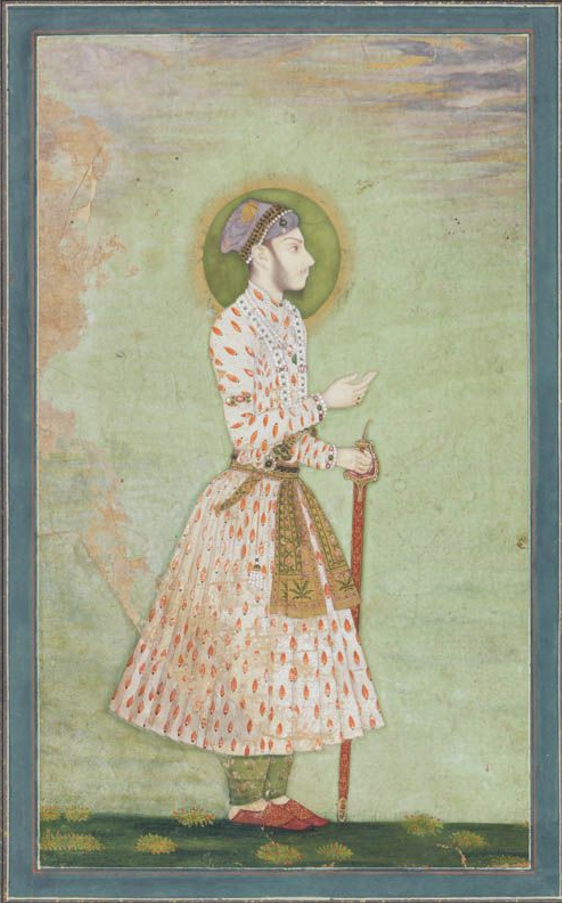
- Portrait of the prince c. 1709
- Born: Azz-ud-Din Mirza c. 1691
- Died: 12 December 1744 (aged 52–53); Delhi, Mughal Empire
- Spouse: Daughter of Bidar Bakht (m. 1709)
- House: Mughal dynasty
- Dynasty: Timurid dynasty
- Father: Jahandar Shah
- Religion: Sunni Islam
- Occupation: Mughal Prince

Azz-ud-Din Mirza (1691 – 12 December 1744) was a Mughal prince and son of emperor Jahandar Shah. He accompanied his father to Lahore during the 1707 Mughal war of succession. In 1714, he was blinded by the emperor Farrukhsiyar.

== Early life ==
Azz-ud-din was the eldest son of Mughal emperor Jahandar Shah. Although his birth was not recorded, the year has been estimated at 1103 AH (1691/1692 CE). In 1118 AH (1706/1707 CE), he married a daughter of Amir Khan I. On 23 November 1709, he married a daughter of Bidar Bakht (a son of Azz-ud-din's uncle, Azam Shah).

== Career ==
During the 1707 Mughal war of succession, Azz-ud-din marched to Lahore with his father Jahandar Shah on 31 March 1707 to fight Azam Shah. A succession crisis developed in the empire after the death of Bahadur Shah I. In the war that followed, Azz-ud-din was imprisoned by a faction led by Jahan Shah on 27 March 1712. His commanders, Rustam Dil Khan and Jani Khan, released Azz-ud-din after Jahan Shah's death.

After Jahandar Shah moved his capital to Delhi, a rumour spread that Farrukhsiyar was marching to the capital; Azz-ud-din was given 50,000 Mughal troops and sent to Agra to guard the borders. His step-mother Lal Kunwar did not trust his capabilities, and put him under the tutelage of Khwaja Hussain and Kokaltash Khan.

The Sayyid brothers declared their allegiance to Farrukhsiyar in late 1712. In September of that year, Farrukhsiyar began marching towards the capital; in response, the emperor sent Azz-ud-din from Agra. In Koda Jahanabad, Manikpur faujdar Chabela Ram denied his request to accompany him. By the end of November, Azz-ud-din reached Khajwa and began building entrenchments in the city. His camp was attacked by rocket fire on 25 November, and Azz-ud-din retaliated by firing cannon shots into his opponent's camp. The firing increased by 27 November, and Khawaja Hussain's request to leave the battlefield was denied by the prince. Forging the seal of Lal Kunwar, he wrote to him falsely claiming that the emperor had died. The prince was asked to return to the capital to ascend the throne. Thinking the letter was genuine, Azz-ud-din left the battlefield (and the treasure chests) with his begums. On 21 January 1714, Azz-ud-din was blinded in accordance with instructions from Farrukhsiyar at the Tripolia Gates; Farrukhsiyar suspected that the Sayyid brothers might challenge the throne, using Azz-ud-din as a proxy.

== Death ==
Azz-ud-din died on 12 December 1744 in Delhi.
