= Jahandar Shah =

Mughal emperor from 1712 to 1713

Jahandar Shah جهاندار شاه
- Padishah; Al-Sultan Al-Azam
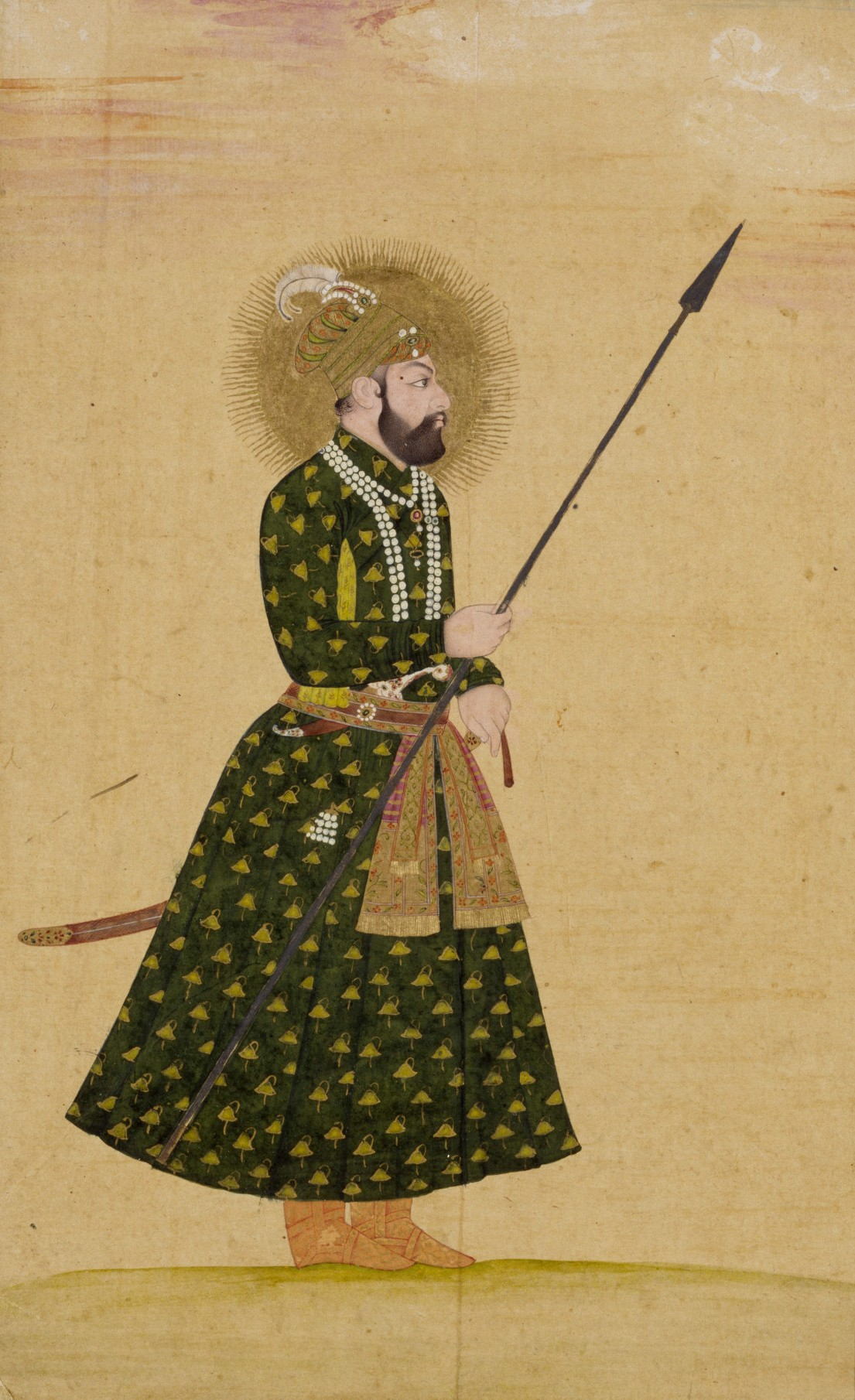
- Portrait of Jahandar Shah, c. 1712, currently held at the Victoria and Albert Museum in London, England

Mughal emperor
- Reign: 29 March 1712 – 11 February 1713
- Coronation: 29 March 1712
- Predecessor: Shah Alam I
- Successor: Farrukh Siyar
- Born: Mirza Mu'izz-ud-Din Beg Muhammad Khan; 10 May 1661; Deccan, Mughal Empire
- Died: 11 February 1713 (aged 51); Delhi, Mughal Empire
- Burial: Humayun's Tomb, Delhi, India
- Spouses: Sayyid-un-Nissa Begum (m. 1684); Imtiyaz Mahal; Muazzamabadi Mahal; Anup Bai
- Issue: Izz-ud-Din Mirza; Azz-ud-Din Mirza; Alamgir II; Azz-ud Daulah; Muiz-ud Daulah; Rabih Begum; Iffat Ara Begum
Names
- Mīrzā Mu'izz-ud-Dīn Muhammad Jahāndār Shāh Bahādur
Posthumous name
- Khuld Aramgah (lit. 'Peaceful in paradise'')
- House: Mughal dynasty
- Dynasty: Timurid dynasty
- Father: Shah Alam I
- Mother: Nizam Bai
- Religion: Sunni Islam (Hanafi)

Jahandar Shah (Note: lit. 'The Owner of the World', Persian pronunciation: [d͡ʒaˈhɑːn.ˈdɑːr ʃɑːh]) (Mirza Mu'izz-ud-Din Beg Muhammad Khan; 10 May 1661 – 11 February 1713) was the ninth Mughal emperor briefly from 1712 to 1713.

Jahandar Shah was the eldest son of Sultan Bahadur Shah I, He ascended the throne of his forefathers after a bloody conflict against his brothers: Azim-ush-Shan, Rafi-ush-Shan, and Jahan Shah. It ended up with his victory and the deaths of all his brothers. His vizier, Zulfiqar Khan was among his most prominent supporters and one of the main pillars of his power during that confrontation, playing a decisive role in securing his throne and establishing his authority.

Jahandar Shah is considered the first Mughal emperor to serve as little more than a Puppet ruler, as he came under the control of his vizier. Historians agree that he lacked the political and administrative qualities necessary to preserve the empire of his forefathers, Far from expanding the empire or strengthening its foundations; he became known for indulgence and debauchery, devoting himself to gatherings of music, entertainment, and drinking, as well as the company of women, dancers, and singers, while neglecting the affairs of state and the administration of its institutions.

== Early life ==
Prince Mu'izz-ud-din was born on 10 May 1661 in Deccan Subah to Prince Mu'azzam. His mother Nizam Bai, the daughter of Fatehyawar Jang, was a noble from Hyderabad. He was Muazzam's eldest son, and eldest grandson of reigning emperor Aurangzeb. Following Mughal tradition, his birth was grandly celebrated by the Mughal court.

During Aurangzeb's reign, he participated in military campaigning in the Deccan for three years as he was capable in his youth, after which he was permanently shifted to northern India. In 1706, he brough the rebellious Mirani chief of Dera Ghazi Khan into submission.

After Aurangzeb's death, Prince Mu'azzam won the ensuing succession struggle and in June 1707, ascended the throne as Bahadur Shah. Upon his father's accession, Mu'izz-ud-din was awarded the title Jahandar Shah, and made governor of Thatta and Multan. Through the course of Bahadur Shah's reign, Jahandar Shah would stay at the imperial court, like the other sons of Bahadur Shah, because the emperor had ascended the throne at an old age, and the princes wanted to be within close reach of the throne in case of his demise.

== War of succession ==
A war of succession began as Bahadur Shah lay on his deathbed in 1712. The most powerful prince at the time of his death was his second son Azim-ush-Shan, who had amassed significant resources as the subahdar of Bengal. Jahandar Shah was the weakest, with little-to-no military power or funds.

Unlike previous Mughal wars of succession, the outcome of this war was engineered by a noble, Zulfiqar Khan, the mir bakhshi and one of the most powerful figures in the Mughal empire. He built an alliance between Jahandar Shah, and his younger brothers Rafi-ush-Shan and Jahan Shah, proposing to them that they could divide the empire between them upon victory (with Zulfiqar Khan serving as their common mir bakhshi). Azim-us-Shan was defeated and killed, following which Jahandar Shah broke the alliance and turned on his brothers, defeating them and killing them with the help of Zulfiqar Khan, emerging as the victor of the succession struggle.

== Reign ==
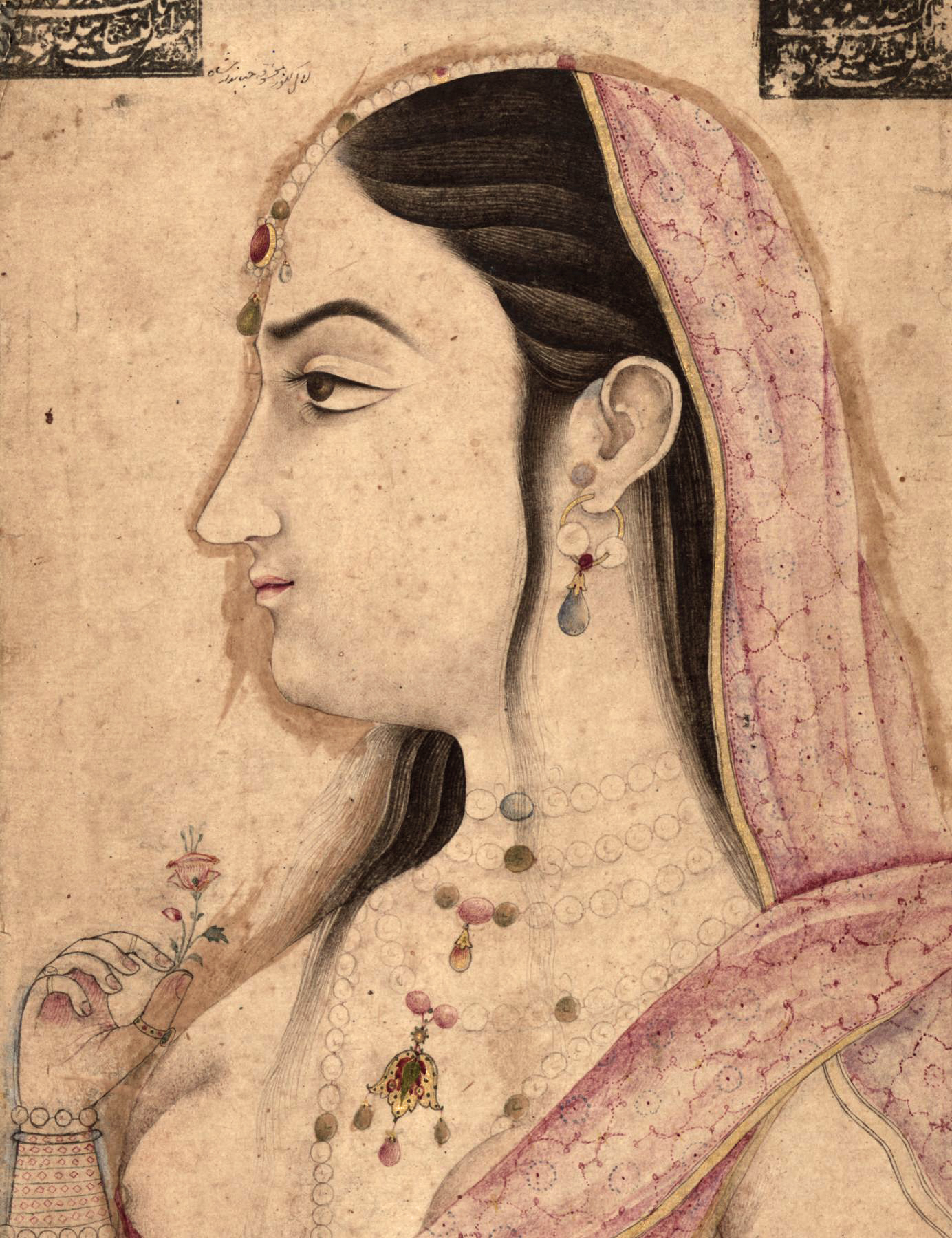
Lal Kunwar

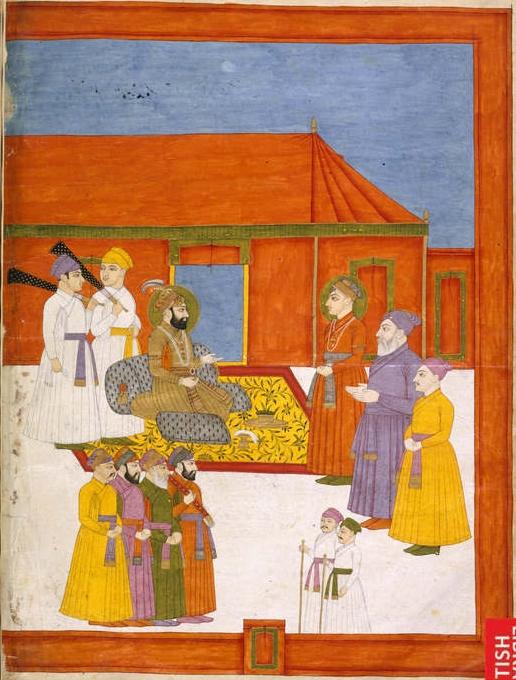
Mughal Army commander Abdus Samad Khan Bahadur being received by Jahandar Shah

Jahandar Shah was crowned on 29 March, 1712. His accession was not well-supported in the empire, and he was viewed as an illegitimate ruler. Hence, upon his coronation, Jahandar Shah moved to consolidate his authority by rewarding and promoting his supporters. He departed from previous Mughal succession practices by severely punishing the nobles who had supported his brothers in the succession, with several of them being executed. He also let the bodies of the defeated princes rot in the open for several days before their entombment, unlike previous emperors who had insisted on a proper burial.

With Jahandar Shah's accession, Zulfiqar Khan assumed the post of wazir. Due to Jahandar Shah's complete dependence on him, and the circumstances of his accession to the throne, effective power was wielded not by the emperor but by Zulfiqar Khan himself. This was the first occurrence in Mughal history that absolute power over the empire was wielded by an outsider to the dynasty. As the effective ruler during Jahandar Shah's reign, Zulfiqar Khan sought to establish amicable relationships with the Rajputs, Sikhs, and Marathas, and bring back peace in the empire. However, the empire's finances were deteriorating, continuing a trend that had begun with Jahandar Shah's predecessors, which decreased the empire's military effectiveness. The excessive power enjoyed by Zulfiqar Khan caused Jahandar Shah to conspire against him, creating political chaos.

During his reign, Jahandar Shah married his beloved Lal Kunwar, she became his favoured wife, and subsequently her family gained unprecedent power and status. Jahandar Shah also indulged in feasts and entertainments. Contemporary chroniclers and later historians have pointed out such aspects of the emperor's personal life, and the cruelty meted to his opponents, as reasons behind the turbulence of his reign. However, recent scholars highlight other factors; Munis Faruqui emphasizes his political weakness as a prince, which set him up for failure as a ruler. Abhishek Kaicker notes that nobles had themselves became more self-interested around the time of Jahandar Shah's accession, and that the "cruelty" of his reign was their defense for siding with Farrukhsiyar, who deposed Jahandar Shah.

=== Deposition ===
Jahandar Shah's accession invited the challenge of his nephew Farrukhsiyar, the son of Azim-ush-Shan, who was based in Bengal. With little independent resources, he unsuccessfully attempted to find backing for his bid. He eventually found powerful support in the Sayyid brothers, Husain Ali Khan and Abdullah Khan, administrators of Azim-ush-Shan who had been removed from their postings by Jahandar Shah. With their resources and political connections, Farrukhsiyar assembled a rebel army and advanced on the throne. The underpaid imperial army was defeated in battle near Agra in early 1713.

== Death ==
Upon defeat, Jahandar Shah fled to Delhi and sought refuge at the house of Zulfiqar Khan and his father Asad Khan. However, the two imprisoned him and turned him over to Farrukhsiyar, in hopes of securing his favour. Farrukhsiyar had both Jahandar Shah and Zulfiqar Khan executed, with Jahandar Shah being beaten to death and then beheaded on 11 February, 1713. Jahandar Shah's body was paraded around Delhi in parts, hanging upside down from two elephants. He was buried in Humayun's tomb.

== Personal life ==
Jahandar Shah's first wife was the daughter of Mirza Mukarram Khan Safavi. The marriage took place on 13 October 1676. After her death he married her niece, Sayyid-un-Nissa Begum, the daughter of Mirza Rustam. The marriage took place on 30 August 1684. Qazi Abu Sa'id united them in the presence of Emperor Aurangzeb, and Prince Muhammad Muazzam (future Bahadur Shah I). The marriage was consummated on 18 September. Sayyid-un-Nissa Begum was presented with jewels worth 67,000 rupees. The celebrations were supervised by Princess Zinat-un-Nissa Begum.

Another wife was Anup Bai. She died at Delhi on 17 April 1735. According to historian William Irvine, she was the mother of Prince Muhammad Aziz-ud-din Mirza, born in 1687–88, who ascended the throne as Alamgir II. However, according to contemporary sources from Alamgir's reign, his mother was named Muazzamabadi Mahal. Another wife was Lal Kunwar, the daughter of Khasusiyat Khan. Jahandar Shah was very fond of her, and after his accession to the throne, he gave her the title Imtiyaz Mahal.

One of his daughters was Rabih Begum. She was betrothed to Bidar Dil Mirza, son of Bidar Bakht Mirza, on 20 May 1710, and died on 7 September 1710. Another daughter was Iffat Ara Begum, who was married to Khwaja Musa Sarbuland Khan, son of Khwaja Yaqub Surbuland Khan Naqshbandi Bukhari (died 1684-5), who died on 8 July 1739 at Delhi, aged nearly seventy.

== Full title ==
His full title was Shahanshah-i-Ghazi Abu'l Fath Mu'izz-ud-Din Muhammad Jahandar Shah Sahib-i-Qiran Padshah-i-Jahan (Khuld Aramgah).

== Coins ==
Jahandar Shah reintroduced couplets and issued coins in gold, silver, and copper. Two couplets i.e. Abu al-Fateh and Sahab Qiran were used. Copper coins were issued in both weight standard i.e. 20 grams and 14 grams.

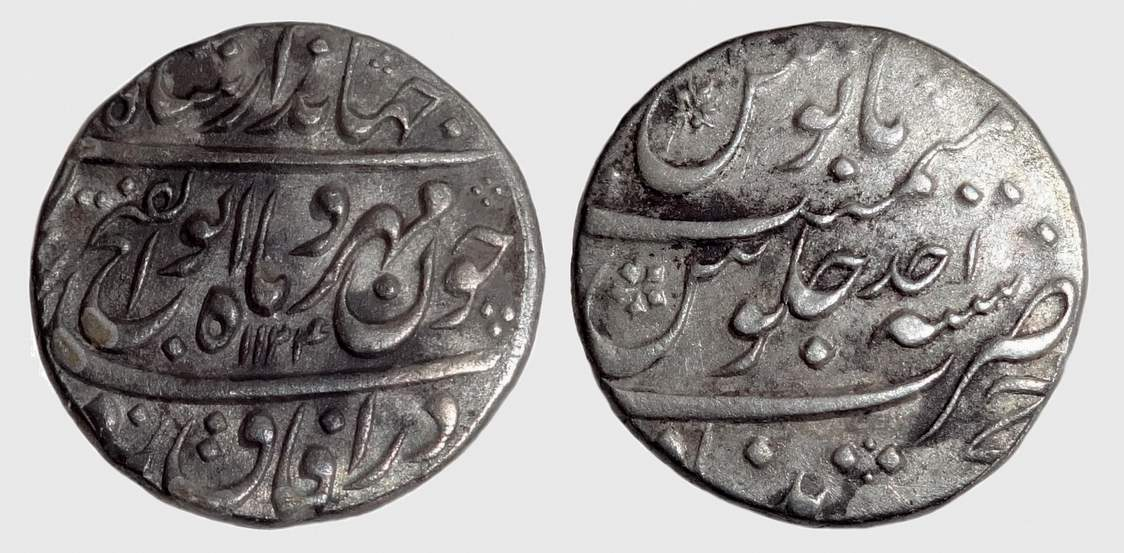
Silver Rupee of Abu al-Fateh couplet, Khujista Bunyaad, AH1124 Ry.Ahd

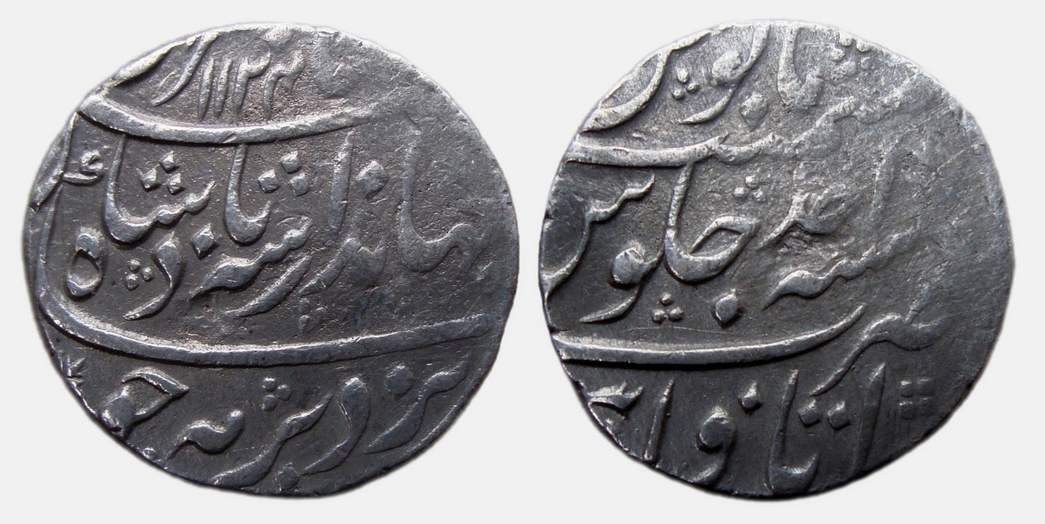
Silver Rupee of Sahab Qiran couplet, Itawa, AH1124 Ry.Ahd

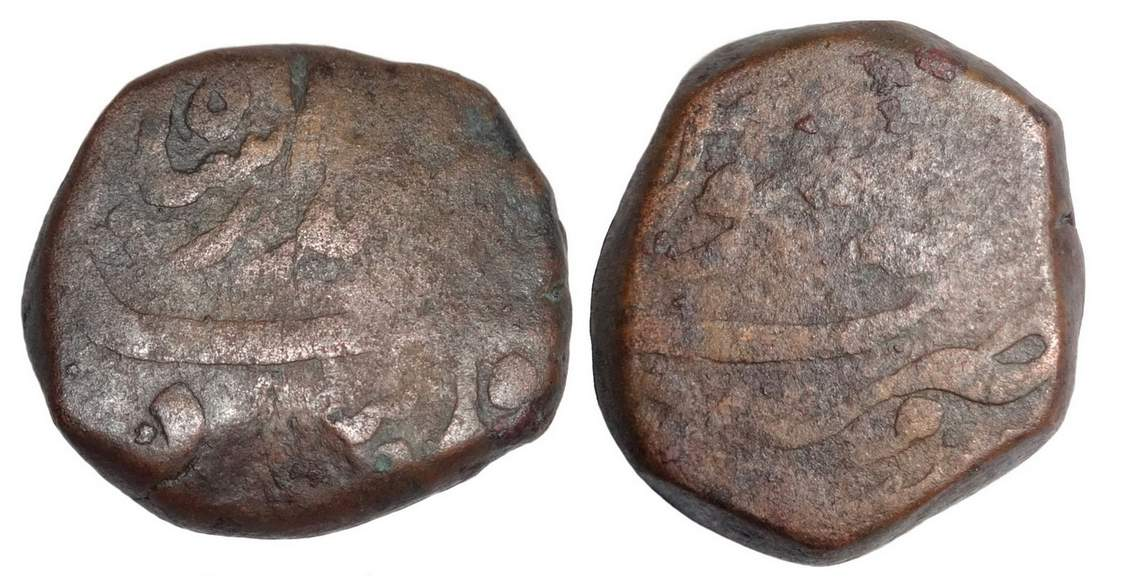
Copper paisa of 20.21 grams from Surat mint

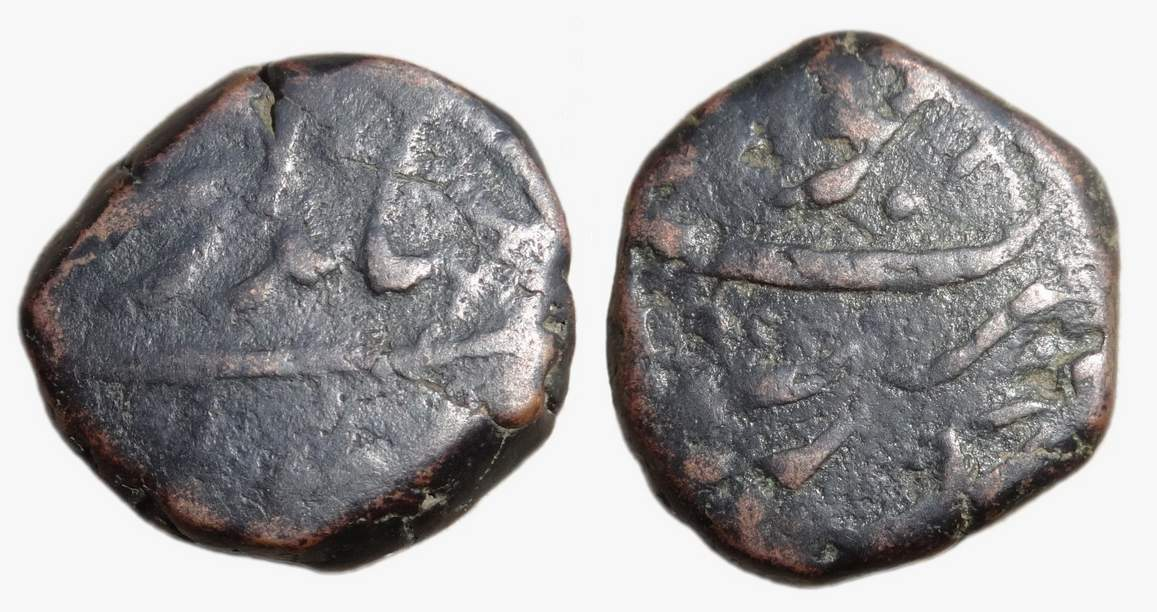
Copper paisa of 13.85 grams from Surat mint

== See also ==
- The Garden of Knowledge

== Bibliography ==
=== Arabic ===
- Maḥmūd Shākir (2000), التاريخ الإسلامي: العهد العثماني (in Arabic), vol. 8 (4th ed.), Beirut: al-mktb al-islāmī, Wikidata Q139912843
- Sayyid, Fuʼād Ṣāliḥ (2015), أشهر الأحداث العالمية (1 - 1899م) (in Arabic) (1st ed.), Beirut: Maktabat Ḥasan Al-ʻAṣrīya, OCLC 1402355196, Wikidata Q139907934

==== English ====
- Alam, Muzaffar (2013). The Crisis of Empire in Mughal North India: Awadh and Punjab, 1707-48 (Second ed.). New Delhi: Oxford University Press. ISBN 978-0-19-908238-4. OCLC 847731660.
- Bilimoriya, Jamshedji Hormasji (1908). Ruka'at-i-Alamgiri; or, Letters of Aurungzebe, with historical and explanatory notes. London: Luzac.
- Chandra, Satish (2002). Parties and politics at the Mughal Court, 1707-1740 (4th ed.). New Delhi: Oxford University Press. p. 107. ISBN 0-19-565444-7. OCLC 50004530.
- Eaton, Richard Maxwell (2019). India in the Persianate Age, 1000-1765. London: Allen Lane. ISBN 978-0-7139-9582-4. OCLC 1103492435.
- Faruqui, Munis D (2012), Princes of the Mughal Empire, 1504–1719, Cambridge: Cambridge University Press, ISBN 978-1-139-52619-7, OCLC 808366461
- Irvine, William (1922). Sarkar, Jadunath (ed.). Later Mughals. Vol. 1 1707-1720. London: Luzac. OCLC 698290839.
- Kaicker, Abhishek (2020). The king and the people : sovereignty and popular politics in Mughal Delhi. New York, NY: Oxford University Press. ISBN 978-0-19-007070-0. OCLC 1114271590.
- Lal, Muni (1989). Mini Mughals. Delhi: Konark Publishers. OCLC 610435140.
- Markovits, Claude; George, Nisha; Hendry, Maggy (2002). A history of modern India, 1480-1950. London: Anthem Press. OCLC 606753485.
- Mirza, Mohammad bin Rustam (1960). Tarikh-i-Muhammadi. Vol. II. Syed Noor-ul-Hassan.
- Montgomery-Massingberd, Hugh (1977). Burke's Royal Families of the World. Vol. II. Burke's Peerage. ISBN 978-0-85011-029-6.
- Nigam, S. B. P. (1983). The Jahandarnamah of Nur- ud-rin. Journal of Indian History. Vol. 61. Department of Modern Indian History.
- Richards, John F, ed. (1993). The Mughal Empire. Cambridge University Press.
- Sarkar, Jadunath (1947). Maasir-i-Alamgiri: A History of Emperor Aurangzib-Alamgir (reign 1658–1707 AD) of Saqi Mustad Khan. Royal Asiatic Society of Bengal, Calcutta.
- Kulkarni, G.T. (2005). "The world's first ever news selling agency". In Bagchi, Amiya Kumar; Sinha, Dipankar; Bagchi, Barnita (eds.). Webs of history: information, communication, and technology from early to post-colonial India. ISBN 978-8-173-04613-1.

Jahandar Shah Timurid dynasty
Preceded by Bahadur Shah I	Mughal Emperor; 1712–1713	Succeeded by Farrukhsiyar
