= Rabih Begum =

Shahzadi of the Mughal Empire

- Shahzadi of the Mughal Empire
- Born: 1695, Multan, Mughal Empire (modern day Multan, Punjab Province, Pakistan
- Died: 20 May 1710, Delhi, Mughal Empire
- House: Timurid
- Father: Jahandar Shah
- Mother: A concubine

Rabih Begum, also spelled Rabi Begum, was a Mughal princess and the daughter of Jahandar Shah, the 9th Mughal emperor.

== Life ==
Rabih Begum was born in Multan, 1695 to a concubine of Jahandar Shah whose name is not known. She was very intelligent, gifted with the sensitivities of a poet, and well versed in multiple languages, namely Urdu, Persian, and Arabic. She was fond of poetry and literature, and by the time she was 12 years of age, she had memorised all the works of Amir Khusrau, Kabir, and Surdas.

On the 20th of May, 1710, she was betrothed to Bidar Dil Mirza, the son of prince Bidar Bakht Mirza, the subahdar of Gujarat whose father, Muhammad Azam Shah briefly became emperor in 1707. She later died the same year on 7 September 1710.
