= Abdullah Khan Barha =

Abdullah Khan Barha Sayyid Miyan I
- Nawab of Ajmer; Nawab of Bijapur Sayyid Miyan I

Subahdar of Ajmer
- Reign: ? – 1710
- Predecessor: Position established
- Successor: Abdullah Khan II

Subahdar of Bijapur
- Reign: 12 September 1686 – ?
- Born: Jansath, Mughal Empire
- Died: Ajmer, Mughal Empire
- Burial: Ajmer
- Issue: Nawab Sayyid Hassan Ali Khan (later, Sayyid Mian II and Abdullah Khan II); Nawab Sayyid Hussain Ali Khan; Nawab Sayyid Najmuddin Ali Khan; Sayyid Saifuddin Khan
Regnal name
- Sayyid Mian
- House: Barha Dynasty
- Father: Nawab Ghulam Muhammad Khan Barha
- Religion: Shia Islam

Nawab Sayyid Abdullah Khan I also known as Sayyid Mian I, was the father of Hassan Ali Khan Barha and Hussain Ali Khan Barha, the two famous Sayyid Brothers. His full name was Sayyid Abdullah Khan Tihanpuri, Tihanpur was the ancestral village of this branch of Sayyids in Patiala.

Sayyid Mian, was a loyal serviceman of Aurangzeb, he became famous as a commander during the Siege of Bijapur for planning the trenches and leading assaults during the Siege of Bijapur. Due to his services he was appointed the first Mughal Subahdar of Bijapur.

== Ancestry ==
Syed Mian belonged to the Barha dynasty, who claimed to be descendants of Muhammad, or Sayyids, this claim was always dubious. Emperor Jahangir, although noting that people questioned their lineage, considered their bravery as a proof of their claims. They took much pride in their Indian ancestry, and according to the American historian Richard M. Eaton, were "as native to India as were Jats, Rajputs or Marathas." Dirk H. A. Kolff writes that they were of peasant origins, the ancestors had moved at an uncertain date from their homeland in Punjab to a barren region in Muzaffarnagar district of Uttar Pradesh.

By the time of the Emperor Aurangzeb, the dynasty was firmly regarded as "Old Nobility" and enjoyed the unique status of holding the premier realms of Ajmer and Dakhin.

== Biography ==
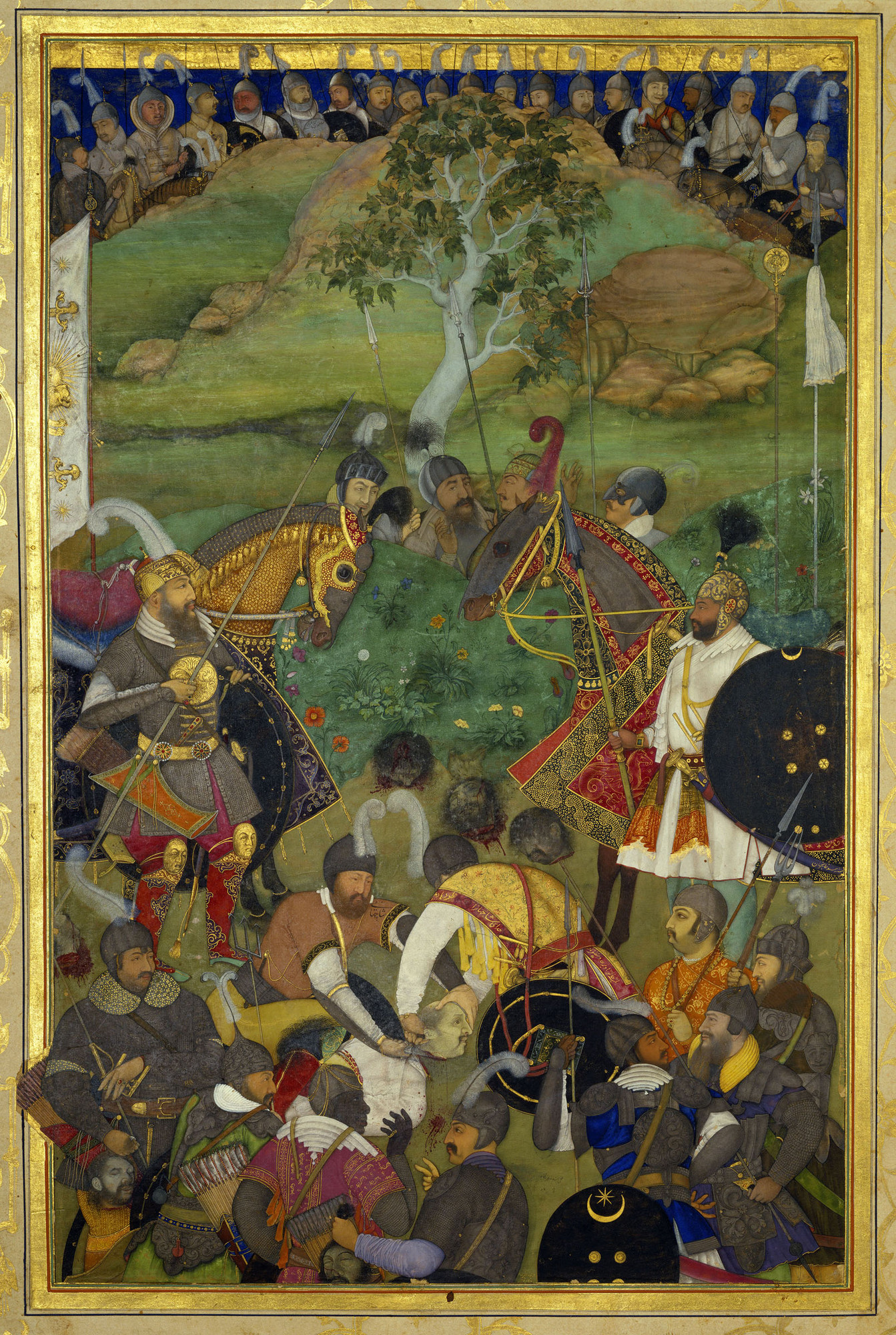
The Decapitation of Khan Jahan Lodi by Khan-i Jahan Muzaffar Barha on the left and Syed Mian on the right

Abdullah Khan Barha served in the succession war between Aurangzeb and his Brother Dara Shikoh, on the side of Dara. After Dara's defeat, the Emperor Aurangzeb pardoned Abdullah Khan and allowed him to continue his military service in allegiance to him.

Abdullah Khan rose to fame during the Siege of Bijapur and afterwards was made the first Subedar of Bijapur. He later came to be made the Subedar of Ajmer and granted the title of "Sayyid Mian" by the Emperor Aurangzeb. His sons Hassan Ali Khan and Hussain Ali Khan served with the Imperial Prince of Azim-U-Shan son of the Imperial Prince Mu'azzam. After helping Mu'azzam ascend to the throne of Delhi as Bahdur Shah I. The new emperor awarded the bravery of the brothers for their service in the Battle of Agra, 1707, by giving them the Subedari of Allahabad and latter Patna.
