= Hussain Ali Khan Barha =

- Subahdar of Aurangabad; Subahdar of Multan; Faujdar of Ranthambore; Subahdar of Bihar; Faujdar of Hindaun-Bayana Umdat-ul-mulk, Amir-ul-Umara, Bahadur, Feroze Jung, Sipah Sardar, Mir Bakhshi
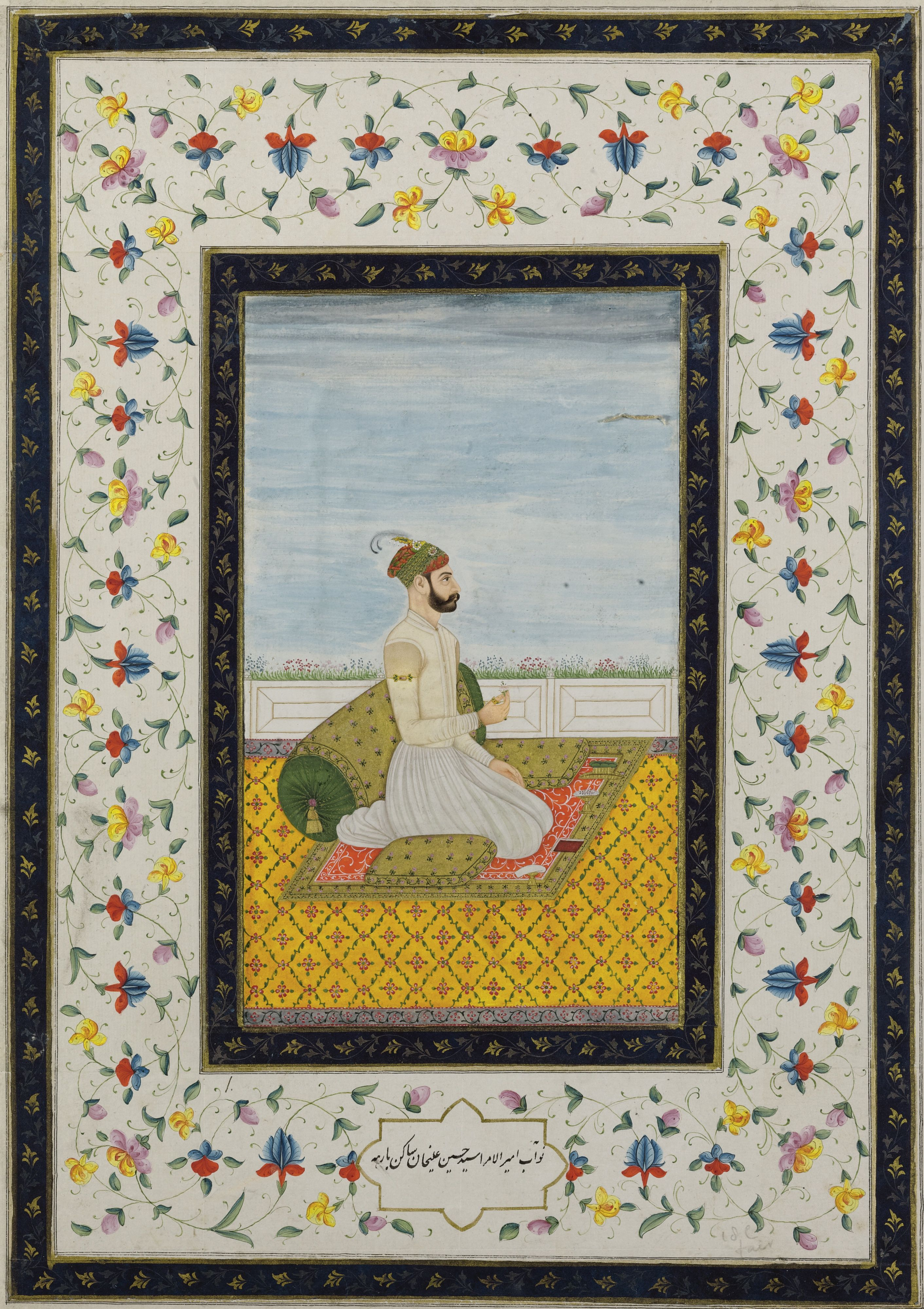
- Amir-ul-Umara Sayyid Hussain Ali Khan

Nawab of Aurangabad
- Under nominal Mughal suzerainty: 1715 – 8 October 1720
- Predecessor: Dianat Khan
- Successor: Nizam ul-Mulk
- Born: Hussain Ali Khan; 1666; Jansath
- Died: 8 October 1720 (aged 53–54)
- Burial: Maqbara of Sayyid Mian, Ajmer
Names
- Umdat Al Mulk, Amir Al Umara, Nawab Sayyid Hussain Ali Khan Sakin Barha
Regnal name
- Umdat Al Mulk
- House: Barha
- Father: Sayyid Mian Abdullah Khan I
- Religion: Islam
- Occupation: Commander of Mughal Forces

Nawab Sayyid Hussain Ali Khan Barha (1666 – 8 October 1720), officially Itisham-ul-Mulk, was a kingmaker of the later Mughal Period. He is best known for ordering the death of Emperor Farrukhsiyar, largely in an attempt to halt the numerous assassination attempts that the latter had ordered against him and his brother Abdullah Khan Barha. Hussain Ali Khan rose as a kingmaker in early 18th century India, when he was concurrently the Mughal governor of Ajmer and Aurangabad in the Deccan.

Both Hussain Ali Khan and his brother, Abdullah Khan, had a hand in the installation or deposition (or both) of several emperors to the throne at Delhi, including: Bahadur Shah I, Jahandar Shah, Farrukhsiyar, Rafi ud Darajat, Shah Jahan II, Ibrahim and Muhammad Shah. The brothers eventually became de facto rulers of the sub-continent by the early 18th century, at a time when India's economy was the largest in the world.

== Early life and family ==
Barha was the second son of the Nawab of Ajmer, Mian Abdullah Khan I. Barha dynasty, to which Hussain Ali Khan belonged, was of peasant origins, and his ancestors had moved at an uncertain date from their homeland in Punjab to a barren region in Muzaffarnagar district of Uttar Pradesh. Although Barhas claimed to be descendants of Muhammad, or Sayyids, this claim was always dubious. Emperor Jahangir, although noting that people questioned their lineage, considered their bravery as a proof of their claims. They took much pride in their Indian ancestry, and according to the American historian Richard M. Eaton, were "as native to India as were Jats, Rajputs or Marathas." By the time of Emperor Aurangzeb, the dynasty was firmly regarded as "Old Nobility" and held realms of Ajmer and Dakhin. The Sadaat-e-Bara tribe, due to their reputation, acquired a hereditary right to lead the vanguard of imperial Mughal armies in every battle. The Mughal emperor Jahangir remarked that the Sadaat-e-Bara were "averters of calamity from this dominion".

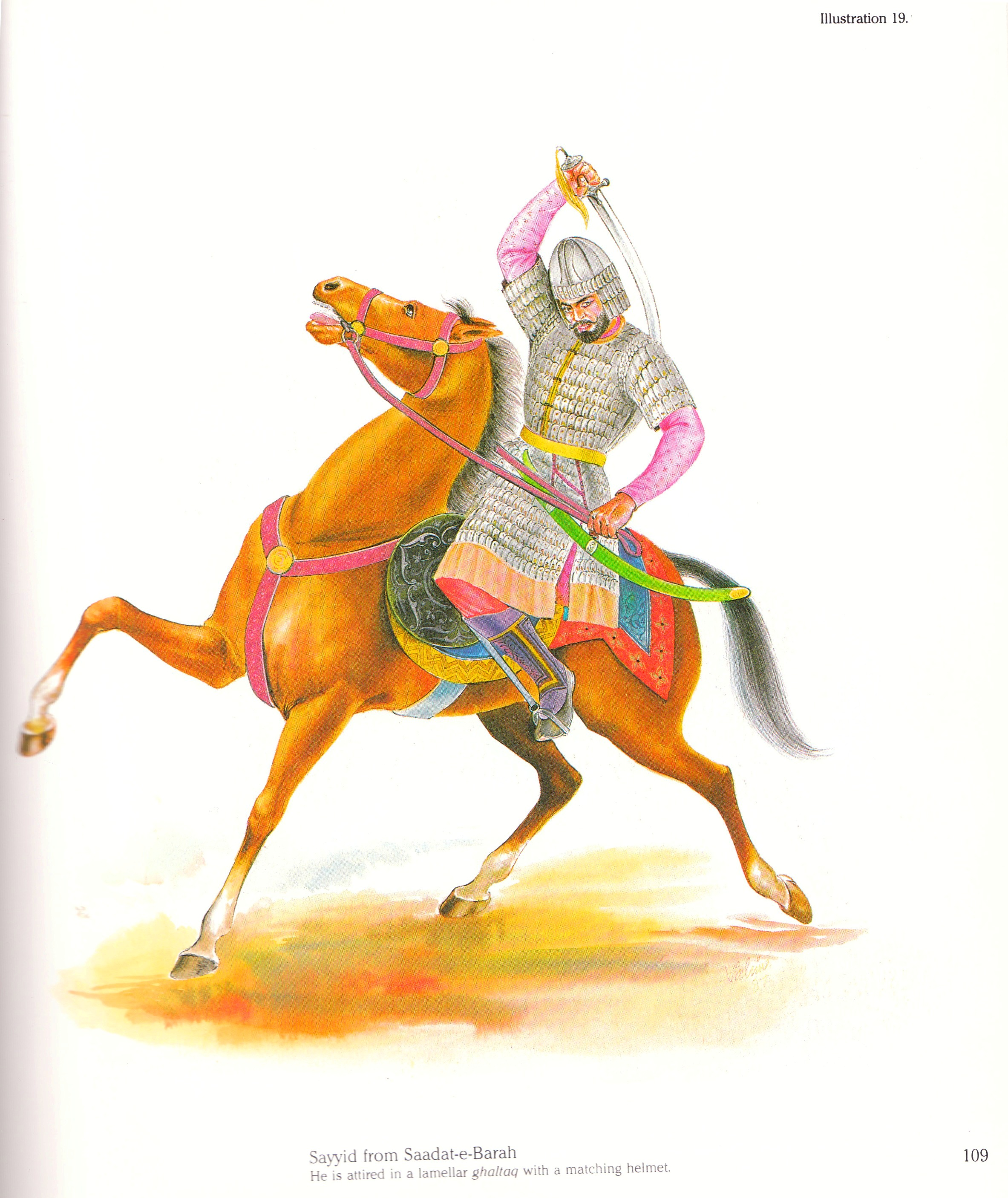
A cavalryman of the Saadat-e Barah

Hussain Ali Khan started his early career as a Faujdar during Aurangzeb's reign and eventually gained higher positions after backing Bahadur Shah I in the succession war ensuing Aurangzeb's death.

== Biography ==
Hussain Ali Khan served as the Commander-in-chief and Mir Bakhshi of the Mughal Empire, the Sipahsalar, and the Amir al-umara (Chief of all nobles), and personally oversaw the end of Ajit Singh's rebellion. He was appointed the Viceroy of the six provinces of the Deccan, after which he broke the peace agreements with the Marathas and engaged in open warfare with all the Maratha chieftains without discrimination. Intoxicated with power, with passing through the territory of Jai Singh, he pillaged the wayside villages of Jaipur and its innocent peasantry, and refused to accept presents from a high-ranking officer. He was inclined to use exaggerated and insolent language, and flatterers in the camp of Hussain Ali Khan used to recite the verses, even in the Emperor's presence

"The whole world and all creation seeks the shelter of your umbrella,
Kings of the world earn crowns through your emprize."

He is noted by William Irvine to have been "Really friendly to the poor and non-oppressive in disposition." During his time as the administrator of Aurangabad, Barha began a reservoir, a bridge and other works for the public.

== Death ==
He was eventually assassinated by Turkish nobles also known as the Turani faction. On the pretext of presenting a petition concerning his malnourished troops, Haider Beg Dughlat fatally stabbed Hussain Ali Khan as his attention was diverted to reading the petition. Haider Beg Dughlat was immediately killed by Hussain Ali Khan's fourteen year old nephew Sayyid Nurallah Khan (Sayyid Nur Ali) who was himself immediately killed by Mughal troops. According to the historian Khizr Khan, Hussain Ali Khan was buried in his fathers tomb at Ajmer.

== Titles ==
Upon helping the Emperor Farrukhsiyar to the throne of Delhi, Hussain Ali Khan Barha was awarded with the position of Mir Bakhshi and granted the following titles and appellations: Umdat-ul-mulk, Amir-ul-Umara, Bahadur, Feroze Jung, Sipah Sardar.

== Depictions ==
Depictions of Nawab Sayyid Hussain Ali Khan Barha
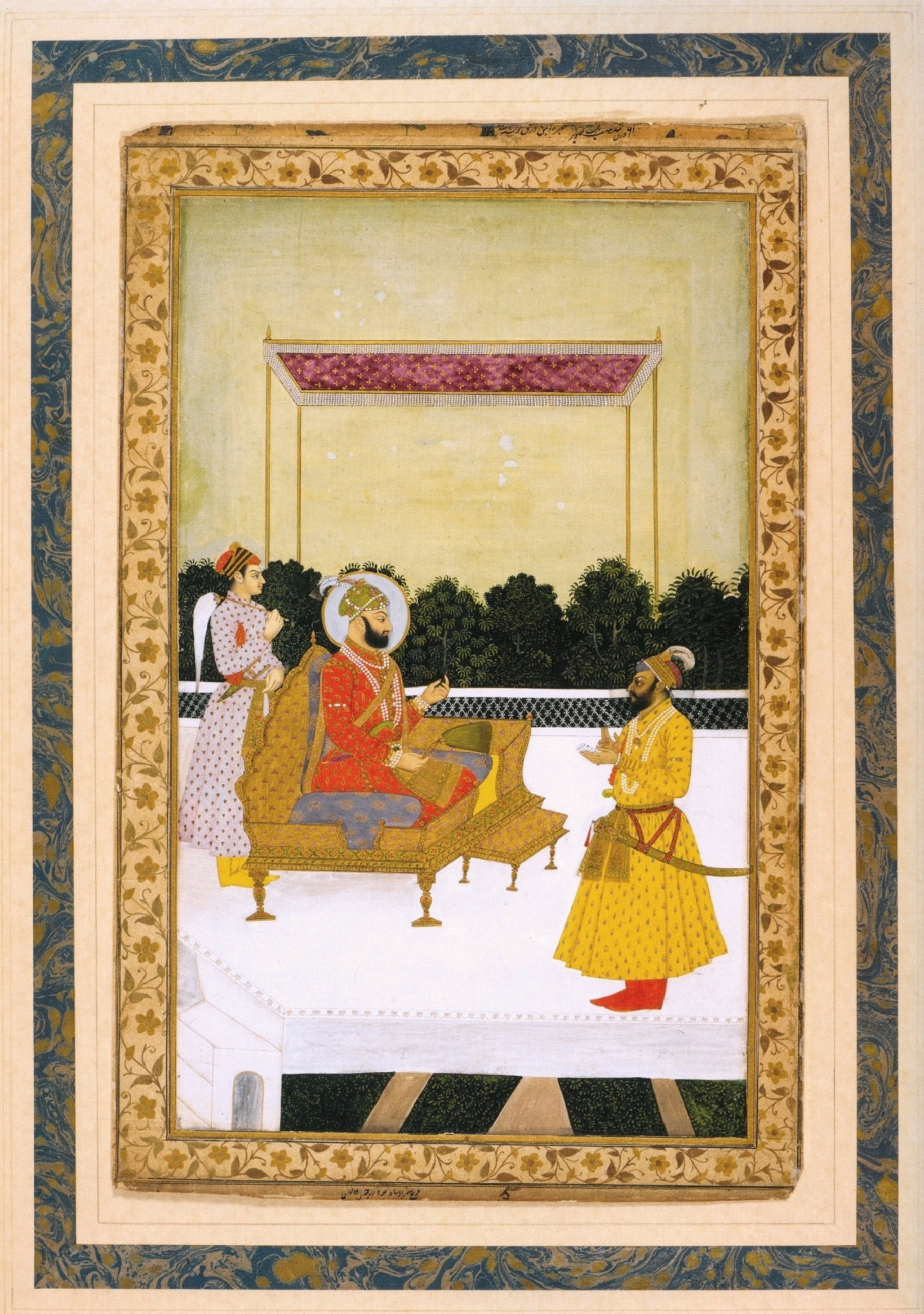
The Emperor Furrukhsiyar receiving Hussain Ali Khan.

Abdullah Khan (Gold Cummerbund) with his brothers. Seated opposite his younger brother Nawab Hussain Ali Khan Barha (without a cummerbund).
