= Hassan Ali Khan Barha =

Mughal noble (1666–1722)

- Nawab of Ajmer, Allahabad and Bihar
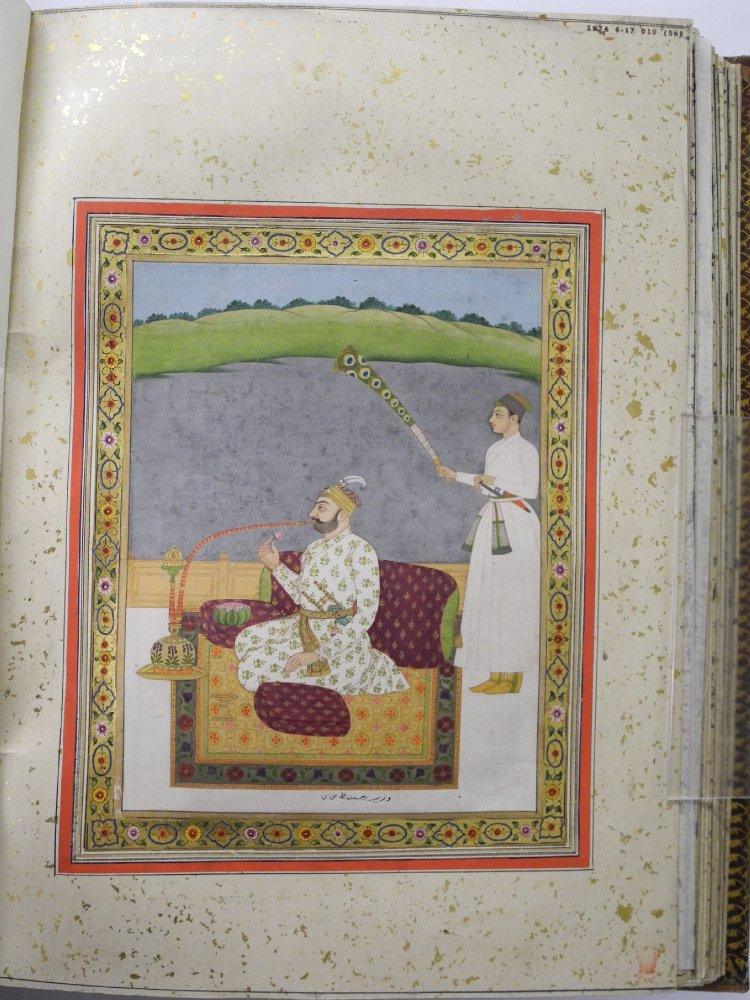
- Nawab Syed Hassan Ali Khan Barha smoking a shish pipe while being attended to by a servant

Nawab of Ajmer
- Reign: 1710 – 13 November 1720
- Predecessor: Abdullah Khan I
- Successor: Sayyid Nazim ud-din Khan

Nawab of Allahabad
- Predecessor: Qudrat-ullah Khan
- Successor: Mirza Sarbuland Khan
- Born: Hassan Ali Khan; 1666; Jansath, Subah of Delhi, Mughal Empire
- Died: 12 October 1722 (aged 55–56); Delhi, Subah of Delhi, Mughal Empire
- Burial: Delhi
Regnal name
- Sayyid Mian II
- House: Barha Dynasty
- Father: Abdullah Khan I
- Religion: Islam
- Occupation: Wazir-e-Azam and Sipahsalar

Nawab Sayyid Hassan Ali Khan Barha (1666 – 12 October 1722), also known as Qutub-ul-Mulk, Nawab Sayyid Mian II, and Abdullah Khan II, was one of the Sayyid brothers, and a key figure in the Mughal Empire under Farrukhsiyar.

He was the eldest son of the Nawab of Ajmer, Sayyid Mian Abdullah Khan I and later inherited his father's titles as well as the name Abdullah Khan but was also frequently referred to as Qutb al mulk, "Pivot of the Realm". Deposing emperors at their own will, both Abdullah Khan and his brother Hussain Ali Khan became the most powerful figures in early 18th century Mughal court.

== Ancestry ==
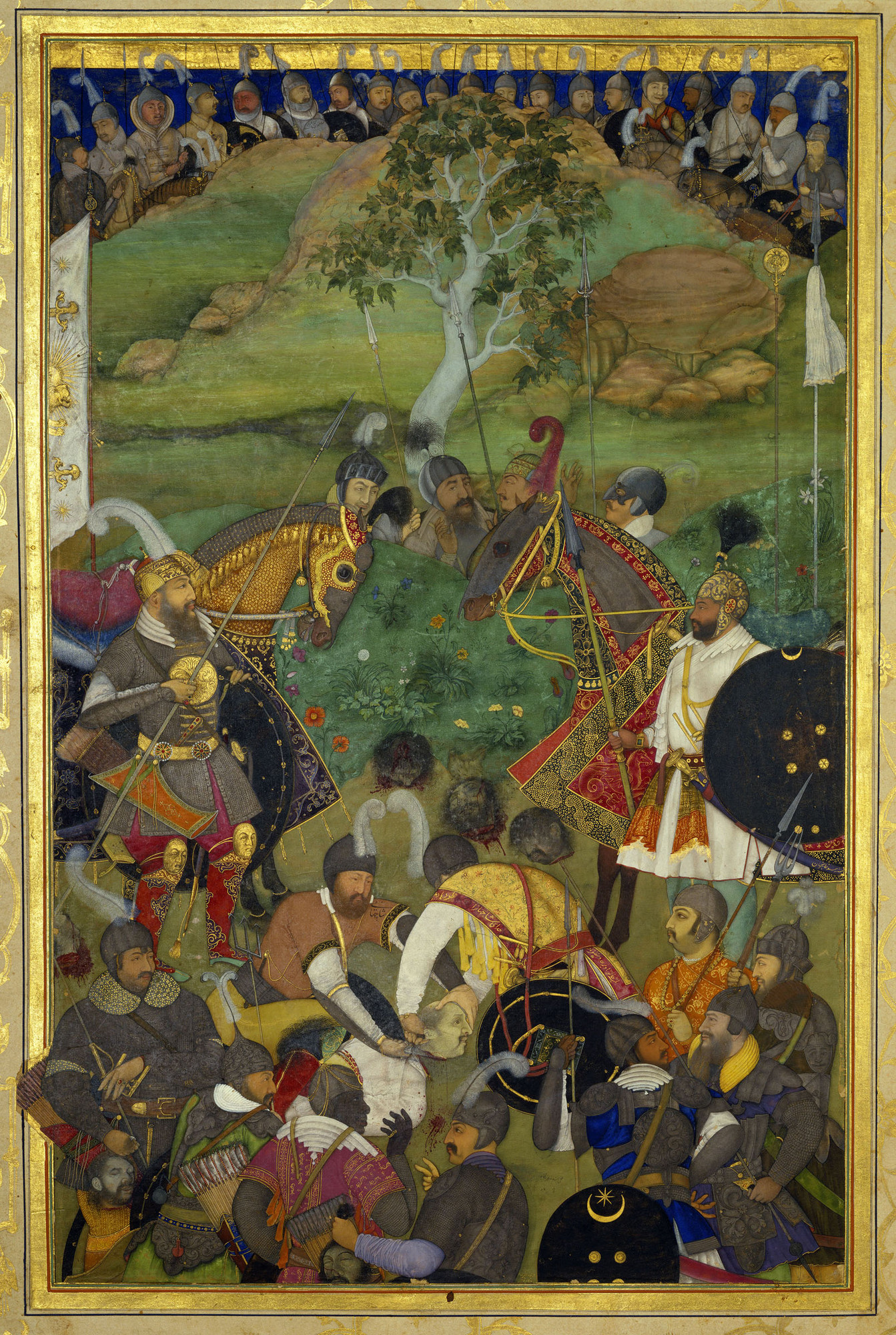
Khan-i Jahan Muzaffar Barha

Hussan Ali belonged to the Barha dynasty, which claimed to be descendants of Muhammad, or Sayyids, this claim was always dubious. Emperor Jahangir, although noting that people questioned their lineage, considered their bravery as a proof of their claims. They took much pride in their Indian ancestry, and according to the American historian Richard M. Eaton, were "as native to India as were Jats, Rajputs or Marathas." Dirk H. A. Kolff writes that they were of peasant origins, their ancestors had moved at an uncertain date from their homeland in Punjab to a barren region in Muzaffarnagar district of Uttar Pradesh.

By the time of the Emperor Aurangzeb, the dynasty was firmly regarded as "Old Nobility" and enjoyed the unique status of holding the premier realms of Ajmer and Dakhin.

== Biography ==
Barha was one of the main backers of Farrukhsiyar's rise to the throne. He initially served as Bakshi for the empire but later rose to become the Vezier or Prime Minister. He was additionally made the Nawab of Bihar which he ruled though proxy. Abdullah Khan and his brother Hussain Ali Khan restored Mughal authority to Ajmer in Rajasthan with the surrender of Maharaja Ajit Singh, and Abdullah Khan negotiated the surrender of the Jat rebel Churaman. During their rule, the Sikh rebel Banda Singh Bahadur was also captured and executed. The Sayyid faction at court were a powerful family rule that was linked together by ties of blood and marriage. The Sayyids engaged in recruitment of soldiers very few who were not Sayyids, or inhabitants of Barha, or were non-Muslims. This distinguished them from their rivals, as it gave them greater strength and cohesion. The unique privilege of the Barha Sayyids of leading the imperial vanguard gave them an advantage over other parts of the Mughal army, and exalted the sense of social pride of the Barha Sayyids. The arrogance of the Sayyid brothers during their rule as they grew in power aroused the jealousy of the king and other nobles in the court. However, the emperor Farrukhsiyar failed in all his attempts to dislodge Sayyid rule.

Over the course of his life. Abdullah Khan Barha had a hand in the installation or deposition of the Emperors: Bahadur Shah I, Jahandar Shah, Farrukhsiyar, Rafi Ud Darajat, Shah Jahnan II, Muhammad Shah and Ibrahim.

Upon the assassination of his brother, Nawab Sayyid Hussain Ali Khan Barha by Turani nobles through the assassin Mirza Haider Dughlat of the Mongol Dughlat tribe, he led an army against the Emperor Muhammad Shah with his own puppet Emperor, Ibrahim. After large swathes of his own army deserted him, Abdullah Khan personally fought on foot following the Barha tradition and was captured by the Emperor. Sayyid Abdullah Khan remained a prisoner in the citadel of Delhi, under the charge of Haider Quli Khan, for another two years. He was "treated with respect, receiving delicate food to eat and fine clothes to wear". But so long as he survived, the Mughals remained uneasy, not knowing what sudden change of fortune might happen. Thus the nobles never ceased their efforts in alarming Muhammad Shah. In order to reduce the power of the Turani nobles, Muhammad Shah thought of using the services of Qutb-ul-Mulk after setting him free and raising him to a high mansab. He sent a message to Qutb-ul-Mulk in this regard and received an encouraging reply from him. However, on hearing of this overture made by Muhammad Shah to Qutb-ul-Mulk and fearing the dire implications thereof, Qutb-ul-Mulk's opponents had him poisoned to death on 12 October 1722.

== Depictions ==
Depictions of Nawab Abdullah Khan Barha
Abdullah Khan (Gold Cummerbund) with his brothers. Seated opposite his younger brother Nawab Hussain Ali Khan Barha (without a cummerbund).

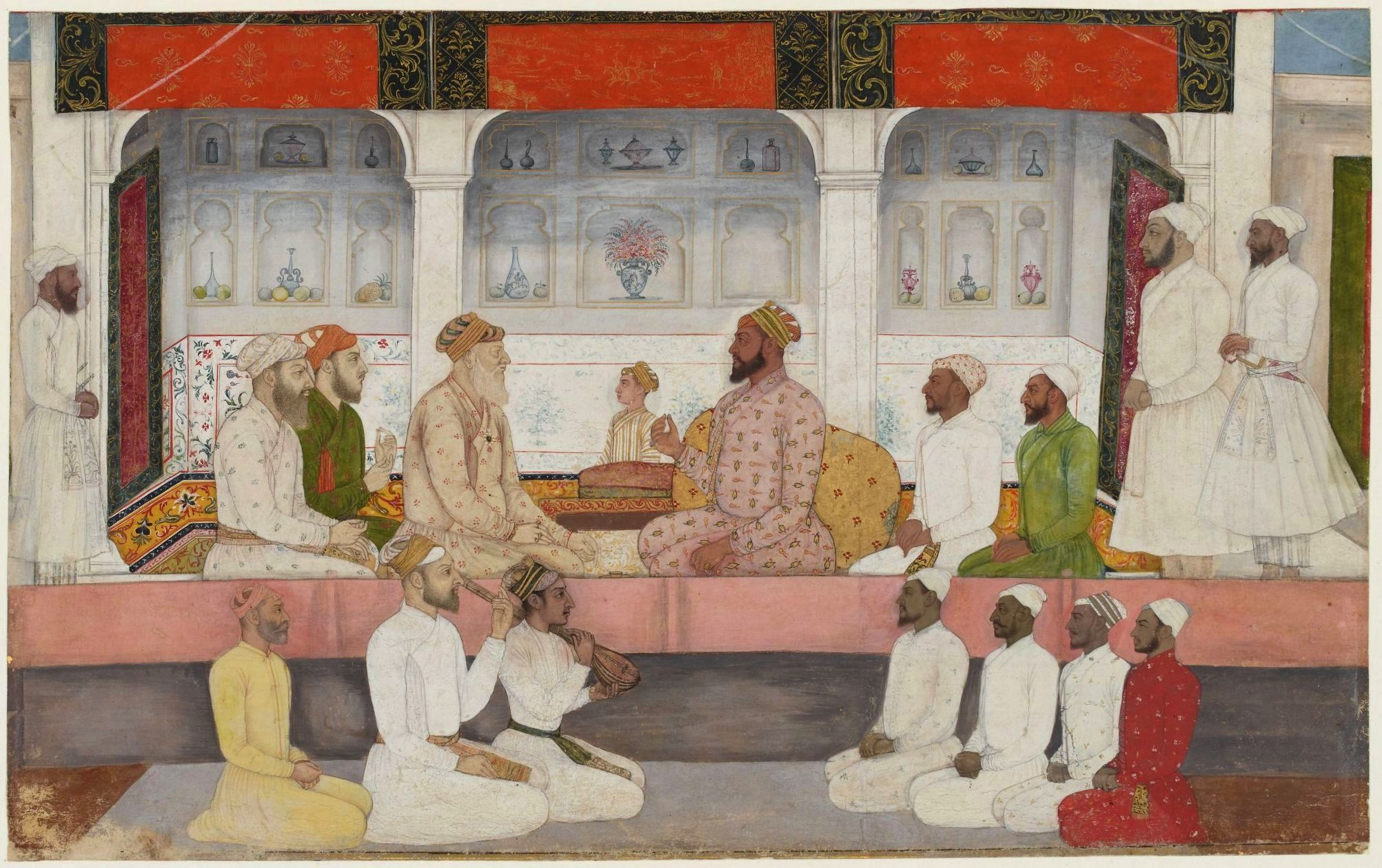
Sayyid Abdullah Khan Barha holding court

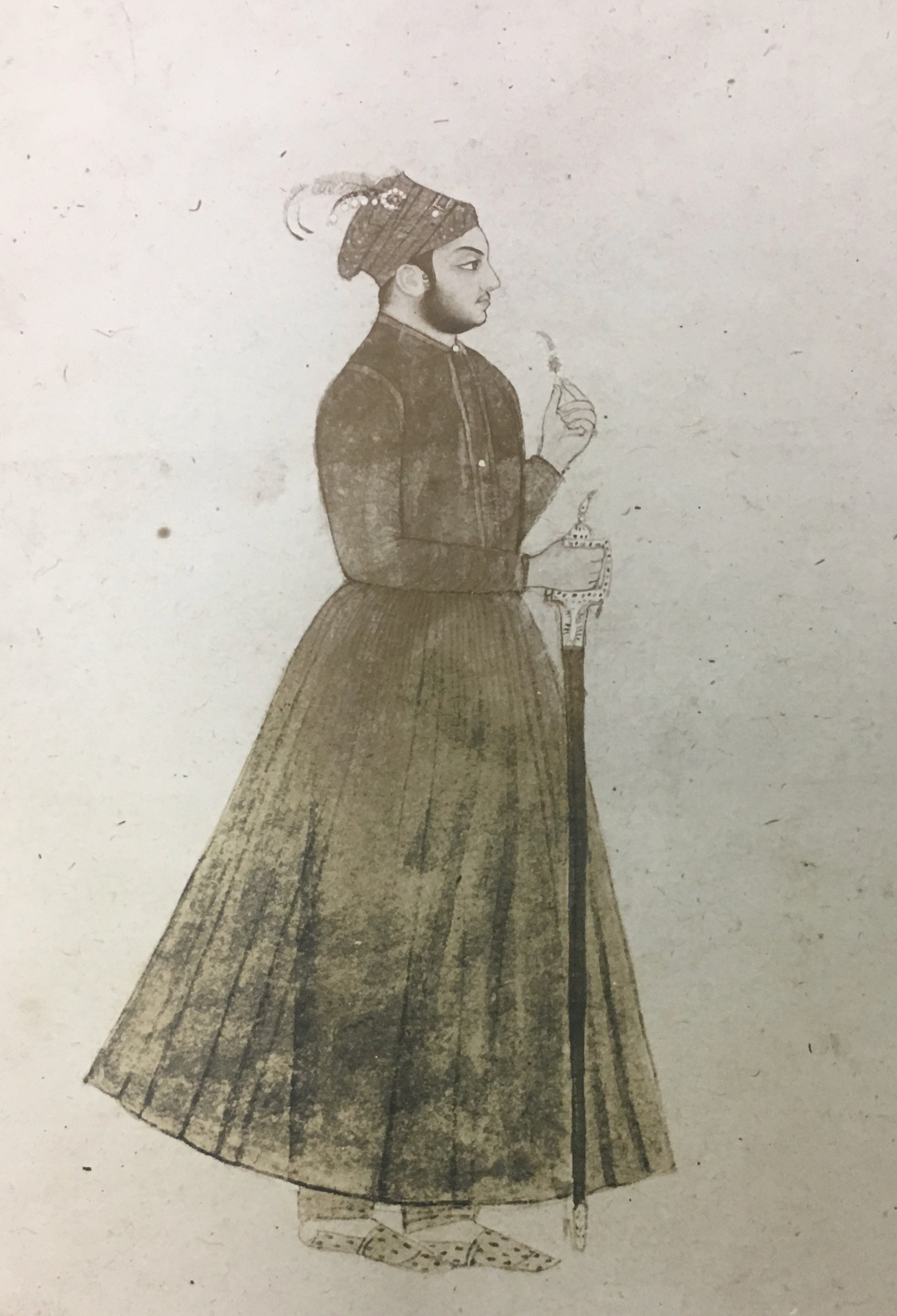
A young Abdullah Khan as governor of Allahabad during the reign of Bahadur Shah I

== Sources ==
- John F. Richards. New Cambridge History of India: The Mughal Empire. New York: Cambridge University Press, 1993. p. 264–268.
- Kolff, Dirk H. A. (2002). Naukar, Rajput, and Sepoy: The Ethnohistory of the Military Labour Market of Hindustan, 1450-1850. Cambridge University Press. ISBN 978-0-521-52305-9.
- Reichmuth, Stefan (2009). The World of Murtada Al-Zabidi: 1732-91 Life, Networks and Writings. Gibb Memorial Trust. ISBN 978-0-906094-60-0.
