= Sayyed Mahmud Khan =

Amir-ul-Kabir Sahib-i-Tabl-o-Alam Mahmud Khan Barha
- Died: 2 October 1573; Mujhera, Muzaffarnagar
- Burial place: Tomb of Mahmud Khan, Mujhera; 29°18′09″N 77°55′45″E
- Children: Qasim Khan Barha; Hashim Khan Barha; Saif Khan Barha; Saalim Khan Barha; Aalam Khan Barha; Jahangir Barha
- Relatives: Sayyid Ahmed Khan Barha (cousin)
- Military career
- Allegiance: Sur Empire, Mughal Empire
- Branch: Mughal Army
- Service years: 1556–1573
- Rank: 4000 Zat, 2000 Sawar
- Known for: Patriarch of Kundliwals
- Conflicts: Akbar's campaigns in Rajasthan, Gujrat, Bundelkhand, Agra

Mahmud Khan Barha (also referred to as Mahmud Khan Bahera) was a distinguished general in the service of the Mughal emperor Akbar. A prominent member of the Sayyids of Barha, he was the son of Sayyid Mubarak. He held the high military rank of four thousand personal (Zat) and two thousand horse (Sawar), and was the first to enter Timurid Service among the Sayyed of Barah.Akbar's Mir Bakhshi Nizamuddin Ahmed remarked that Mahmud was the head of Barha Family and had many retainers. In respect of bravery and courage he had great fame among the people of India.

== Lineage ==
Mahmud Khan belonged to the lineage of the Sayyids of Barha. His direct ancestry, tracing back to the patriarch Abul Farah Wasti, is recorded as follows:

Abul Farah Wasti – Daood – Abdul Fattah – Abul Hasan – Sayyad Ali – Sayyid Muhammad – Sayyid Hasan – Sayyid Hadi – Sayyid Ewaz – Imr Nar – Ikhtiyaruddin – Asaduddin – Sayyid Muhammad Mir – Alauddin – Zainulabedin – Meer Saeed – Mubarak – Mahmud Khan Barha.

== Military career ==
Mahmud first served as a general for Sikandar Shah Suri. However, when he found that Sikandar's cause had no future, Mahmud left him and joined the Mughals.

=== Second Battle of Panipat9 ===
In 1556, the inaugural year of Akbar's reign, Mahmud Khan was dispatched alongside Ali Quli Khan Shaibani to confront Hemu. Hemu had assumed the title of Vikramaditya and mobilized a massive force from Delhi following the defeat of Tardi Beg Khan. In the Second Battle of Panipat, Mahmud Khan was deployed in the vanguard; he fought with great valor and successfully captured Hemu's artillery, which had been sent to the field in advance. Consequently, Ali Quli Khan and Mahmud Khan secured the victory at Panipat before the arrival of Akbar and Bairam Khan.

=== Expeditions in Rajasthan and the Doab ===
- 1557 (964 Hijri): Appointed to chastise Haji Khan (a slave of Sher Shah Suri), who had occupied Ajmer and Nagaur and was in open rebellion.
- 1558 (third regnal year): Deputed to capture the fort of Jitaran in Jodhpur, which he successfully seized from the Rajputs. Later took part in an expedition against Bhadauriyas of Hatkanth in Agra.
- Fiefdom: Following the downfall of Bairam Khan, Mahmud Khan entered the king's immediate service and was granted the Pargana of Sarwat (present-day Muzaffarnagar) as a fiefdom in the Ganges–Yamuna Doab. Mahmud was also granted a jagir in Delhi.

=== Capture and pardon of Mun'im Khan (1562) ===
On 16 May 1562, after the murder of Shams-ud-Din Ataga Khan by Adham Khan Koka, Mun'im Khan (who had secretly instigated the crime) attempted to flee to Kabul. While passing through Mahmud Khan's fief at Sarwat, Mun'im Khan was captured by Mahmud's men. Recognizing the fugitive's status, Mahmud Khan escorted him back to the royal threshold with honor. Emperor Akbar subsequently pardoned Mun'im Khan at the intercession of Mahmud Khan Barha.

=== Gujarat and Bundelkhand campaigns ===
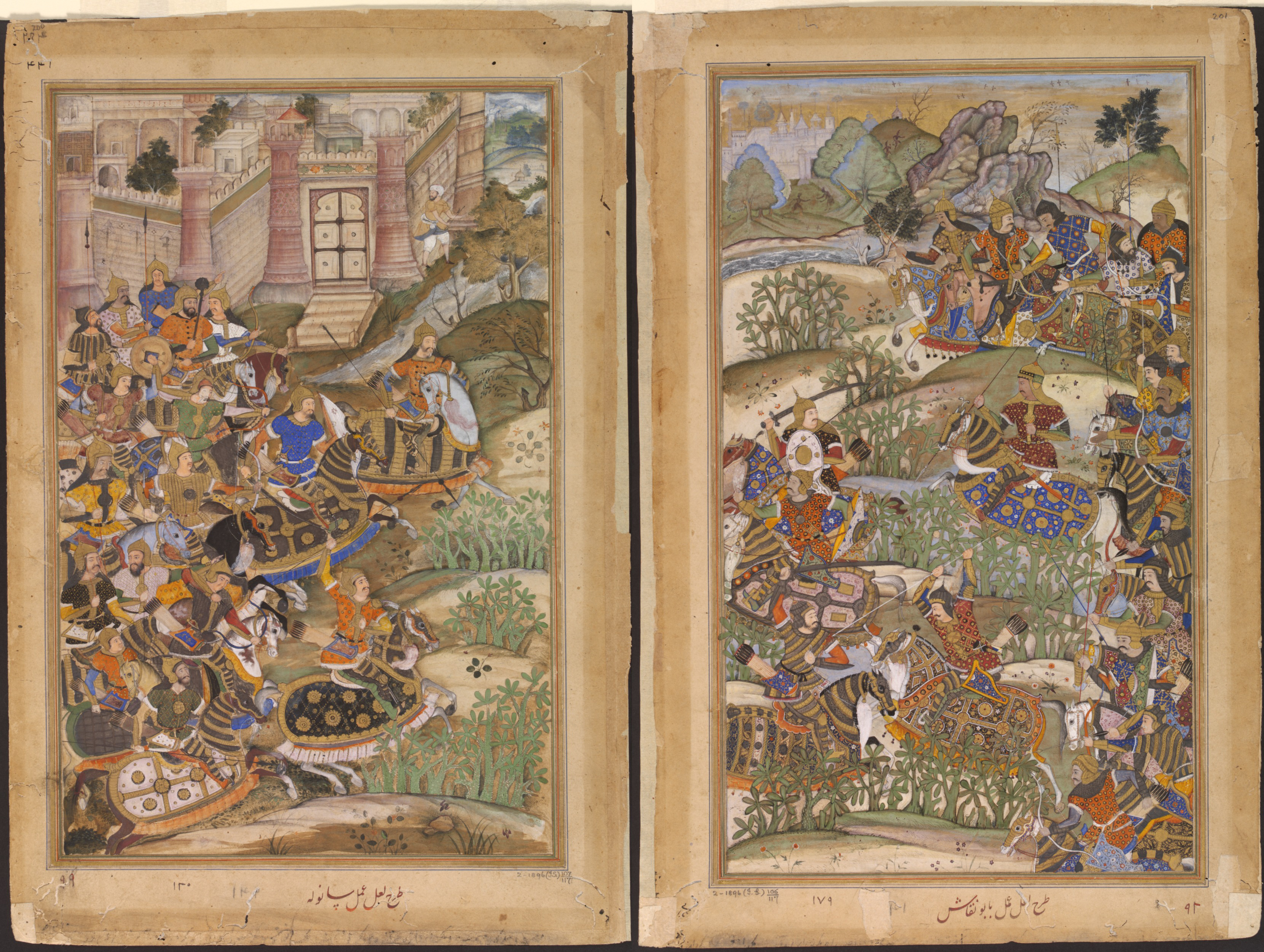
Battle of Sarnal Gujarat-Akbarnama, 1572

In the seventeenth year of the reign, Mahmud Khan accompanied Khan Kalan to Gujarat and was sent in pursuit of Ibrahim Hussain Mirza. He swiftly joined Emperor Akbar near Sarnal, Gujarat, where he distinguished himself in battle.

In the eighteenth year, he was sent as part of an advance force to Gujarat, later joining the royal party at Mirtha near Jodhpur. During the conflict with Muhammad Hussain, Mahmud Khan and a small contingent formed the reserve. He eventually advanced beyond the center to fight with noted courage. Later that year, alongside the Barha and Amroha Sayyids, he led a successful expedition against Madhukar Bundela of Orchha in Bundelkhand, conquering the territory.

== Character ==
Mahmud Khan was known as a straightforward and outspoken soldier. Following his victory over Madhukar Bundela, he reported his deeds to the emperor using the first person ("I") extensively. When the courtier Asaf Khan remarked, "Miranji! This victory was due to the Iqbal-e-Shah" (referring to the king's good fortune), Mahmud Khan—mistaking "Iqbal" for a specific person present at court—replied:

Why do you tell untruth? Iqbal-e-Shah was not there, it was I and my brothers who wielded two-handed swords there.

The emperor, amused by his blunt honesty, favored him with numerous gifts, granted him a standard and drums, and bestowed upon him the title of Bahra Sayyed.

== Death ==
Mahmud Khan Barha died on 2 October 1573 and was buried in his ancestral seat at Mujhera, Muzaffarnagar. His tomb is still located in Mujhera near the octagonal well. He left behind six sons, all of whom became prominent figures in the Mughal army:

- Sayyid Hashim: A major Jagirdar in Ajmer who died in the Battle of Sakrich near Ahmedabad; his family established Hashimpur. Hashim accompanied his uncle, Sayyid Ahmed Khan Barha, in the Battle of Haldighati.
- Sayyid Qasim: Wounded at Sakrich and later appointed as the Governor of Patan; his family settled in Mawana Kalan, Meerut, and held 21 villages.
- Sayyid Aalam: His family established themselves in Khedi Sarae and Tisang.
- Sayyid Salim: His family established Mahmoodpur.
- Sayyid Ali Asghar (Saif Khan Barha): The most celebrated son of Mahmud Khan . Was a favorite of Emperor Jahangir , and served as the Faujdar of Hisar, His family established Saifpur, Meerut.
- Sayyid Jahangir: His son, Nawab Shuja-at Ali Khan, established Jahanabad in Bijnor.
