= Saif Khan Barha =

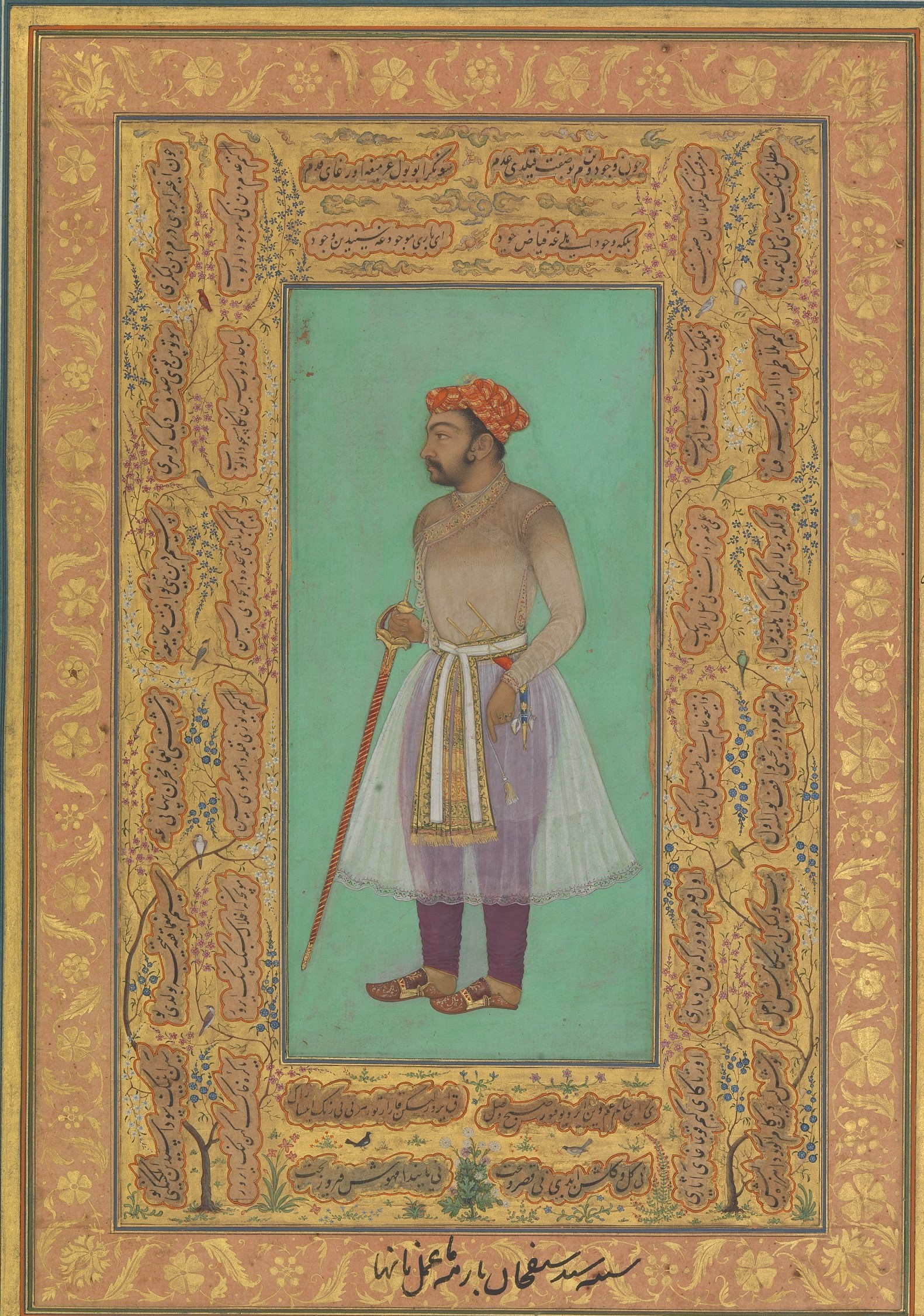
Saif Khan Barha, 1620

Saif Khan Barha was a Mughal nobleman of the Emperor Jahangir since he was a prince and chief of the Sayyids of Barha. He was the son of Sayyed Mahmud Khan Barha.

In 1014 Hijri Emperor Jahangir's son Khusrau Mirza rebelled against the Emperor, Saif Khan supported Jahangir to crush the rebellion. In 1017 Hijri corresponding to 1609 CE Saif Khan was appointed to the Faujdariship of Hisar Firoza, this province as a Mughal tradition since Babur's time had been a fief of all Mughal crown princes.

Saif Khan administered the province on behalf of crown prince Khurram. In 1610 CE he was granted the insignia (Alam).

In 1022 Hijri(1613 CE) he along with Crown prince Khurram later Emperor Shah Jahan was sent to chastise Rana Amar Singh of Udaipur, when the royal army encamped about 20 miles from Udaipur Rana Amar Singh took refuge in hills and his son came to the battlefield, Prince Khurram divided his army in four contingents and one contingent was put under Saif Khan's command. Prince of Udaipur sent his agent with a gift of sixty elephants for truce which was accepted. In 1614, on the occasion of Nauroz celebrations his rank was increased by 500 personal and 200 horses at the intercession of Prince Khurram. Next year in 1615 Saif Khan was honored with Kettle drums (Naqqarah) and his rank was increased by 300 horses thus fixing his rank to 3000 personal and 2000 horse.

In 1616 he was deputed to accompany prince Khurram towards Deccan, Saif Khan died of cholera in Deccan during the campaign on May 24, 1616 CE. On hearing the news of his demise Emperor Jahangir remembered his services and condoled his sons Sayyed Bahadur Ali and Sayyed Diler Ali and gave them both suitable Mansab (rank) Jahangir mentioned the event of his death in his memoirs Tuzk-e-Jahangiri. A miniature portrait of him done by royal painter Nanha survived which is preserved in Metropolitan Museum of Art NY which they have published in a book entitled Emperor's Album.
