= Ajmer Subah =

Subdivision of the Mughal Empire between 1580–1758

- 1580–1752
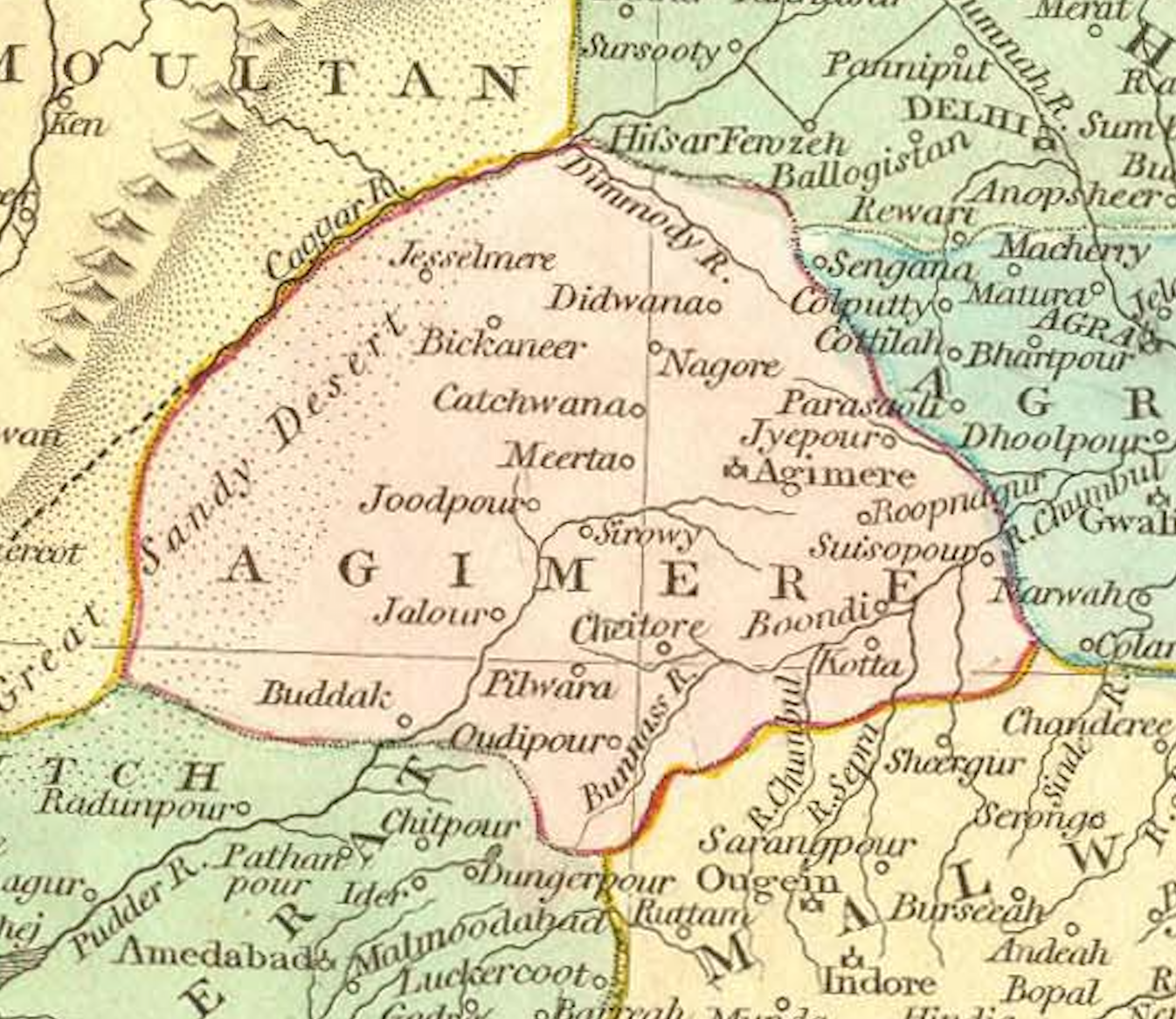
- Ajmer Subah depicted in map of Mughal Empire by Robert Wilkinson (1805)
- Capital: Ajmer
- Subahdar
  - 1580: Dastam Khan
- History
  - Established: 1580
  - Maratha occupation: 1752

Area
  - 1601: 121,095 sq mi (313,630 km^{2})
Preceded by	Succeeded by
Rajput states	Maratha Confederacy; Rajputana Agency
- Today part of: India

The Ajmer Subah (Persian: صوبه اجمیر) was one of the original 12 subahs (provinces) that comprised the Mughal Empire after the administrative reform under the rule of Akbar. Its borders roughly corresponded to modern-day Rajasthan, and the capital was the city of Ajmer.

== History ==
Mughal patronage of the city of Ajmer in the 16th century through the support of local Sufi shrines (such as one dedicated to Moinuddin Chishti) through waqfs, culminating in Akbar's pilgrimage to the city itself in 1562. Jahangir continued the legacy of pilgrimage and imperial patronage. Shah Jahan visited the shrine as well in 1628, 1636, 1643, and 1654. Aurangzeb visited once, prior to his Deccan campaigns.

For a brief period in the 1720, Ajit Singh of Marwar occupied Ajmer and declared independence from Mughal rule until the Barha Sayyids reconquered the province.

In March 1752, the Maratha peshwas demanded the governorship of Ajmer from the Mughals, and Jayappaji Rao Scindia went to war supporting Ram Singh of Marwar when the request was denied, sacking the city of Ajmer.

== Geography ==
Ajmer Subah was bordered to the north by Multan Subah and Delhi Subah, to the west by Thatta Subah, to the South by Gujarat Subah and Malwa Subah and to the east by the Agra Subah.

== Government ==
=== Subahdars ===
Personal Name	Reign
Dastam Khan	1580–c. 1595
Sherza Khan	1595–?
Prince Salim	1598–?
Iftikhar Khan	c. 1680–?
Shujaat Khan	c. 1710–?
Ajit Singh of Marwar	1719–1723
Haider Quli Khan	1723–?
Qamar al-Din	
Jai Singh II	1740–?
Maratha rule
Sahaba Patel	1752-1752
Pandit Govind Rao	1753–1761
Santaji Rao	1761-1770
Sambhaji Rao	1770-1773
Mirza Anwar Beg	1773-1787
Shivaji Nanasaheb (As deputy of Lakhwa Dada)	1790-1801
Perron	1801-1803
Bala Rao Ingaliah (As deputy of Ambaji Ingaliah)	1806-1809
Gomanji Rao	1809-1816
Bapuji Shinde	1816-1818

=== Administrative divisions ===
Ajmer was divided into 7 sarkars under Akbar's reign.

Sarkar	Parganas
Ajmer (capital)	24
Jodhpur	21
Chittor	28
Ranthambore	36
Nagaur	30
Sirohi	
Bikaner	
