= Rustam Dil Khan =

Governor of Mughal Hyderabad

Jan Sipar Khan Azam Khan Rustam Dil Khan

Deputy governor of Hyderabad
- In office 1700-1703, 1705-1708
- Monarch: Aurangzeb

Personal details
- Died: September 1708
- Resting place: Kali Masjid, Yakutpura, Hyderabad
- Parent: Jan Sipar Khan (father)

Rustam Dil Khan (died September 1708) was a noble of the Mughal Empire during the reign of emperor Aurangzeb. His activities were centred around the Mughal province of Hyderabad Subah, which he administered as deputy subahdar (governor) for most of his official career. He was killed by prince Kam Bakhsh during the war of succession after Aurangzeb's death, as the prince attempted a bid for independent rule in the Deccan. He is buried in the Kali Masjid, a mosque he built in the city of Hyderabad.

== Origins ==
Rustam Dil Khan came from a family that had served the Mughal Empire through several generations. His grandfather, named Sayyid Muhammad Zanzwari, was native to Iraq. Following a stint in the region of Khurasan, he migrated to Mughal India in the early 17th century, joining the service of the emperor Jahangir. Zanzwari held the governorship of Delhi during some point of his career, and was titled Mukhtar Khan.

Rustam Dil Khan's father was Jan Sipar Khan, who followed in his father Zanzwari's footsteps by joining the Mughal service. He supported Aurangzeb during the latter's struggle for the Mughal succession, and was later made faujdar of the city of Bidar. Aurangzeb selected him to personally escort Abul Hasan Qutb Shah during the latter's arrest after the Mughal conquest of Golconda. Jan Sipar Khan was subsequently made the first permanent governor of Hyderabad Subah, and served for twelve years before his death in 1700. Rustam Dil Khan's mother was a daughter of a Mughal noble named Khan Zaman.

== Career ==
Rustam Dil Khan assisted his father Jan Sipar Khan during the latter's governorship of Bidar. Jan Sipar Khan was promoted to governor of Hyderabad, following which Rustam Dil Khan took over the governorship of Bidar. He served for a brief period in the late seventeenth century, though the exact dates of his tenure are unclear.

Rustam Dil Khan served as the deputy governor of Hyderabad during his father's tenure. His father stayed at the capital while he led military expeditions against threats to imperial authority in the province. At this time, he was a rank-holding noble. Notable events he was involved in during this time include: his capture of Venkat Rao, a rogue deshmukh, in 1691; his successful negotiation of tribute with Anand Ashwa Rao, a rebellious Valama chief, in 1692; and his unsuccessful pursuit of Maratha general Santaji in 1695.

=== Governor of Hyderabad ===
Following Jan Sipar Khan's death in 1700, the Mughal prince Kam Bakhsh was made the governor of Hyderabad. Rustam Dil Khan was made the prince's deputy governor, and his rank was increased. The prince held this position in absentee, making Rustam Dil Khan the effective governor of the province. His administration was generally unsuccessful; the governor failed to act against multiple instances of banditry and insurgency. In 1702, Rustam Dil Khan besieged Shahpur's fort to capture the bandit Papadu, but the latter escaped. In 1703, the Bedar chief Pidia Nayak occupied Kondaveedu Fort and plundered the coastal districts - the emperor Aurangzeb reduced Rustam Dil Khan's rank for his inaction. Just over a year after Rustam Dil Khan's governorship began, a large Maratha force of 50,000 occupied the capital city of Hyderabad and freely plundered it for three days. Rustam Dil Khan holed himself up in the Golconda fort and eventually got the attackers to withdraw, only by using funds illegally obtained from the imperial treasury.

Reports of Rustam Dil Khan's performance caused emperor Aurangzeb to dismiss him from the deputy governorship by May 1703; he was demoted to faujdar of Sikakul, giving him control over the coastal districts of Hyderabad province. By November 1704, he lost this position as well and was transferred out of Hyderabad; he was appointed faujdar of the Bijapur-Carnatic.

For reasons that are unclear, Aurangzeb reinstated Rustam Dil Khan to the deputy governorship of Hyderabad by 1705, and raised his rank; this ended the short tenure of Daud Khan Panni. Rustam Dil Khan focused on amassing wealth, and built close connections with local powers: the bandit Riza Khan, the Maratha chieftain Krishna Malhar, and the Telugu zamindar Ananda Razu Pusapati of Vizianagaram. According to John F. Richards, such actions may have been to deter the possibility of dismissal from the province of Hyderabad, and to set up one of his own sons as the natural successor to the position.

=== War of succession & death ===
In 1707, emperor Aurangzeb died, triggering a war of succession between the princes. The prince Muhammad Mu'azzam defeated Azam Shah in the Battle of Jajau and crowned himself as emperor Bahadur Shah. Bahadur Shah nominally confirmed Rustam Dil Khan as governor of Hyderabad, and awarded him his father's title of Jan Sipar Khan. Kam Bakhsh, the remaining Mughal prince, still remained active in the Deccan; Rustam Dil Khan intensified his efforts to amass wealth, plundering the region and harassing Mughal officials.

Kam Bakhsh arrived in Hyderabad in early 1708, crowning himself the independent 'king of Golconda'. Rustam Dil Khan offered his tribute and formal submission, upon which Kam Bakhsh confirmed his post as governor of Hyderabad, raised his rank, and awarded him the title 'Azam Khan'. Kam Bakhsh set out to consolidate his rule over the next few months. Discovering that the treasury at Machilipatnam contained a great amount of wealth, Kam Bakhsh attempted to seize it to support his own precarious rule. He was met with resistance from Rustam Dil Khan, who prevented the diwan of Machilipatnam from releasing the funds. Kam Bakhsh was also influenced by his advisors, who had convinced him that Rustam Dil Khan was secretly plotting against him. These factors enraged the prince, who after a few months of conflict, arrested Rustam Dil Khan. Kam Bakhsh invited the unassuming governor to his quarters to help him with a letter to Bahadur Shah; when the governor arrived and removed his weapons, Kam Bakhsh excused himself from the premises, and his associates arrested him.

After three days in confinement, Rustam Dil Khan was executed in September 1708 on Kam Bakhsh's order, by the trampling of an elephant. He was then buried by his residence in Hyderabad, named Imli Mahal. Kam Bakhsh took over his vast personal treasury (reported to be more than 3.3 million gold coins), and imprisoned his family. The prince would go on to be defeated and killed by Bahadur Shah in 1709, clearing the way for the latter's emperorship. Rustam Dil Khan had at least one son, who inherited his grandfather's title of Jan Sipar Khan. He was later made Diwan of the Nizam of Hyderabad, Asaf Jah.

== Patronage ==
As the Mughal governor of Bidar, Rustam Dil Khan built a mosque in the city, within the tomb-shrine of Sufi saint Shah Ali Qadiri. Though local records attest that Rustam Dil Khan's governorship was until 1688, the mosque's inscriptions date the structure to the year 1695, indicating he may have governed for a longer term.

In 1702, Rustam Dil Khan built a mosque in Hyderabad named the Kali Masjid, located in Yakutpura. An inscription on the mosque indicates that he built it a year after his father Jan Sipar Khan's death. The mosque was built close to Rustam Dil Khan's former residence, known as Imli Mahal. The mosque's courtyard contains the tombs of both his father and himself; he constructed his father's tomb during his lifetime, and was interred here following his execution.

== See also ==
- Hyderabad Subah
- Muhammad Kam Bakhsh

== Bibliography ==
- Richards, John F. (1975), Mughal Administration in Golconda, Oxford [England]: Clarendon Press, ISBN 0-19-821561-4, OCLC 2932290
