= Jan Sipar Khan =

Governor of Mughal Hyderabad

- Monarch: Aurangzeb

5th Faujdar of Bidar
- In office 1681–c. 1687
- Deputy: Rustam Dil Khan
- Preceded by: Qalandar Khan
- Succeeded by: Rustam Dil Khan

Subahdar of Hyderabad
- In office c. 1689–1700
- Deputy: Rustam Dil Khan
- Preceded by: Ruhullah Khan
- Succeeded by: Rustam Dil Khan

Personal details
- Born: Mir Bahadur Dil
- Died: 1700
- Resting place: Kali Masjid, Yaqutpura, Hyderabad
- Relations: Mukhtar Khan (brother)
- Children: Rustam Dil Khan
- Parent: Sayyid Muhammad Sanzwari (father)

Military service
- Battles/wars: Mughal war of succession (1658–1659)

Mir Bahadur Dil (died 1700), known by the title Jan Sipar Khan (lit. 'The Life-scattering Khan'), was a noble of the Mughal Empire. He was active during the reign of emperor Aurangzeb, and held offices in the Deccan region of the empire. His most notable position was in the Mughal province of Hyderabad Subah, where he served as its first permanent subahdar (governor) for twelve years, dying in office.

== Origins ==
Jan Sipar Khan's original name was Mir Bahadur Dil. He was the third son of Sayyid Muhammad Sanzwari, a native of Iraq who had migrated to Mughal India in the 17th century (following a stint in the region of Khurasan). The latter joined the service of emperor Jahangir, and later governed Delhi under the title Mukhtar Khan. Jan Sipar Khan also had a brother named Mukhtar Khan, who served as the third Mughal governor of the city of Bidar.

== Career ==
Jan Sipar Khan received his title for fighting in the Mughal war of succession in support of Aurangzeb. In 1681, he was appointed the faujdar (governor) of Bidar under Aurangzeb, replacing a noble named Qalandar Khan. He was the fifth to serve that position since the Mughal capture of the city, and was assisted in governance by his son Rustam Dil Khan. Aurangzeb arrived in Bidar following the successful siege of Golconda, and in 1687 deputed Jan Sipar Khan to escort the last king of Golconda, Abul Hasan Qutb Shah, to be imprisoned in Daulatabad. Historian John F. Richards viewed this as indicative of the emperor's trust in Jan Sipar Khan, and theorizes that this may also have been a deliberate move to collect information from the fallen king. Jan Sipar Khan was subsequently promoted to the governorship of Hyderabad Subah, the Mughal province formed from the annexation of the Golconda Sultanate, replacing the temporary governor Ruhullah Khan. His son Rustam Dil Khan took over his position as governor of Bidar.

=== Governor of Hyderabad ===
Jan Sipar Khan was the first permanent governor of Hyderabad Subah; the previous occupants of the position, Ruhullah Khan and Muhammad Ibrahim, had been interim governors who served for mere months. Jan Sipar Khan took up residence in the capital city of Hyderabad around 1689. His son Rustam Dil Khan served as his deputy; they split their duties such that Jan Sipar Khan resided in the capital while Rustam Dil Khan campaigned in the surrounding regions. The governor's position in Hyderabad was initially weak, due to a wide series of revolts faced by the Mughal south, which meant that Jan Sipar Khan had limited military resources at this disposal. For example, in 1691 the province faced a Maratha raid, during which Jan Sipar Khan barricaded himself in the Golconda fort while surrounding villages were looted. Following 1692 however, Maratha raids eased as the focus of the Mughal-Maratha war shifted to Jinji, which ushured in a period of relative peace. The latter part of his tenure resultantly was more secure. From 1695, Jan Sipar Khan also held a dual position as faujdar of Kaulas, a district and town in Hyderabad Subah that lay west of the capital; this was one of the largest parganas (district) in the province.

== Death ==
Jan Sipar Khan died in 1700, having governed Hyderabad for a period of twelve years. He was succeeded in the governorship by Rustam Dil Khan. At the time of his death, he held a rank of 3500 zat and 2700 sowar. He is buried in the Kali Masjid, a mosque in Yaqutpura, Hyderabad, alongside his son Rustam Dil Khan.

== Bibliography ==
- Richards, John F. (1975), Mughal Administration in Golconda, Oxford [England]: Clarendon Press, ISBN 0-19-821561-4, OCLC 2932290
- Richards, J.F (1976). "The Imperial Crisis in the Deccan". The Journal of Asian Studies. 35 (2): 250. doi:10.2307/2053981. ISSN 0021-9118. JSTOR 2053981.
