= Hyderabad Subah =

Province of the Mughal Empire

Hyderabad Subah Golconda Subah, Dar-ul Jihad
- 1687–1724/1740
- Alam of the Mughal Empire
- Capital: Hyderabad
- History
  - Siege of Golconda: 1687
  - Battle of Shakar Kheda: 1724
  - Disestablished: 1724/1740

Area
  - 1707: 109,362 sq mi (283,250 km^{2})
Preceded by	Succeeded by
Golconda Sultanate	Hyderabad State
- Today part of: India

Hyderabad Subah (Persian: صوبه حیدرآباد), also known as Golconda Subah, was a province of the Mughal Empire encompassing the eastern Deccan region of the Indian subcontinent. It was created in 1687, during the reign of Mughal emperor Aurangzeb, by the annexation of the Golconda Sultanate. Hyderabad Subah later began to secede in the 18th century as the Mughal Empire declined and became fully independent as part of the Nizam-administered Deccan.

The province was given the official epithet of Dar-ul Jihad (House of War) upon annexation by Aurangzeb.

== Background ==
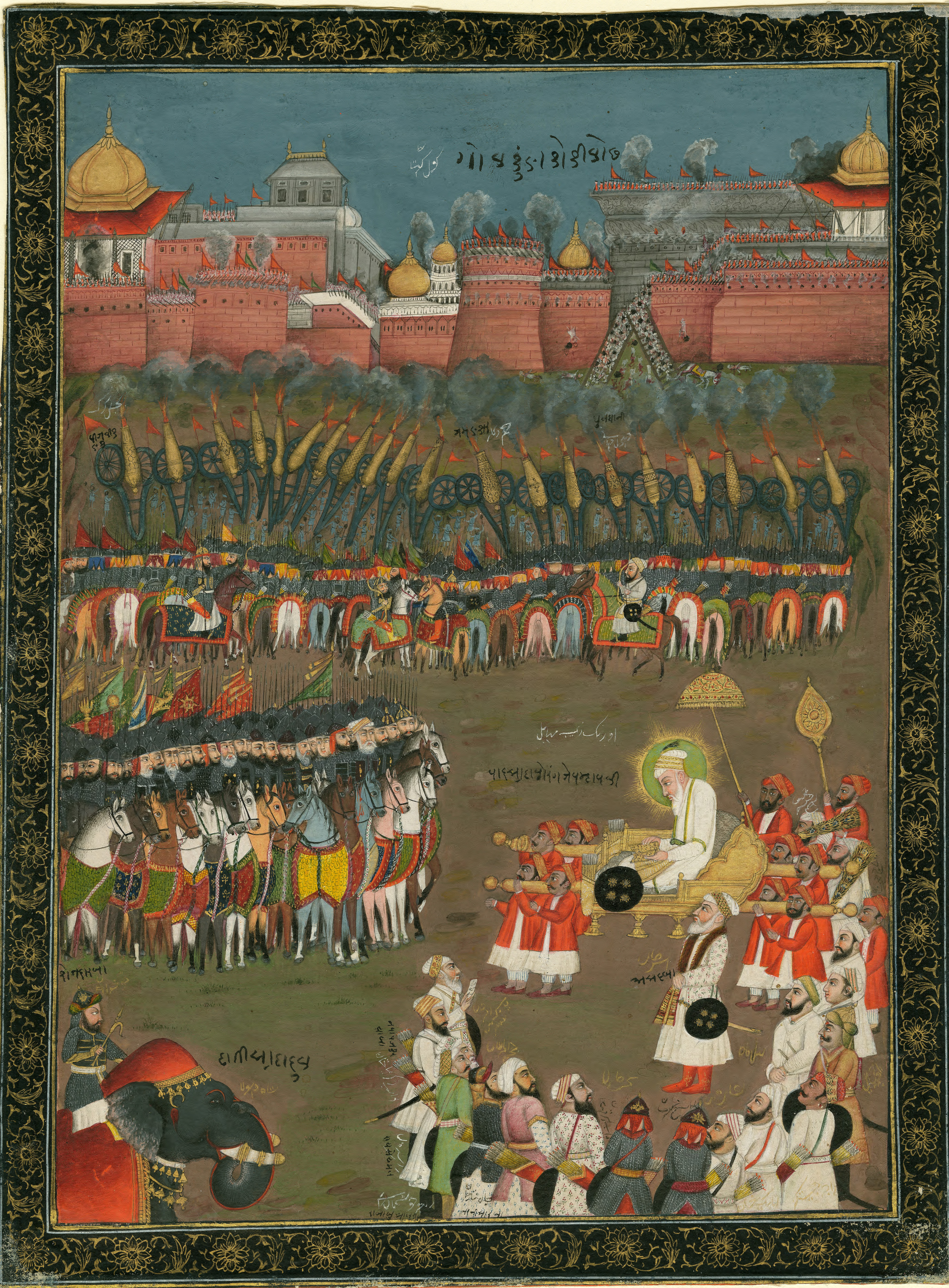
18th-century painting of Aurangzeb at the Siege of Golconda in 1687.

The precedent for Hyderabad Subah lies in the reign of Mughal emperor Shah Jahan, who in 1636 negotiated a deed of submission with the Golconda Sultanate (reigned by the Qutb Shahis), making them tributaries to the Mughals. This was part of a larger imperial project to establish authority in the Deccan; the Ahmadnagar Sultanate had just been annexed, and the Bijapur Sultanate was facing similar pressure from the Mughals. Over the next few decades, Shah Jahan maintained this tributary relationship, though under stress from a faction of the court to formally annex the sultanates. Aurangzeb, a son of Shah Jahan and future emperor, was a key proponent of this, and events in 1656 led to him orchestrating an attack on the Sultanate, which was recalled by his father following a peace agreement. After Aurangzeb himself ascended the throne, he attacked the Golconda Sultanate, leading to the eight-month Siege of Golconda and Mughal victory in 1687; the Sultanate was incorporated into the Mughal Empire. This was the culmination of Mughal policy in the Deccan, and the fulfilment of a long-standing initiative of Aurangzeb.

== History ==
=== Establishment ===
Following the annexation of the Golconda Sultanate, its territories were incorporated into the empire. Particularly, Aurangzeb split the Sultanate into two; the main territory of Golconda (twenty districts to the north of the Krishna River) was made into Hyderabad Subah, while the twelve districts south of this (termed the Karnatik-i-Hyderabadi or Hyderabad-Karnatik) were made into its administrative unit, not fully a province. Aurangzeb initially retained many Qutb Shahi officers in their former positions across the province, mostly for propaganda effect, to make the Mughals' authority seem amicable to the old political order. To this end, the first subahdar (governor) of Hyderabad was Muhammad Ibrahim, a leading general of Golconda who had defected to the Mughals during its conquest of Golconda. Within two months however, Aurangzeb concluded this policy and transported many Golconda officials to other parts of the empire, stationing Mughal officers in their stead; Ruhullah Khan, chief bakhshi (paymaster) of the empire, was made temporary governor of the province.

=== Mughal Hyderabad ===
In less than a year, Aurangzeb replaced Ruhullah Khan with a noble named Jan Sipar Khan, previously faujdar at Bidar. His son Rustam Dil Khan acted as deputy. During the first four years of its existence, Hyderabad Subah faced continual raids by Marathas since the region was no longer protected by the treaties between the Marathas and the Golconda Sultan. Aurangzeb did not provide much assistance with this, as he was more concerned with political instability in the Hyderabad Karnatik. Hyderabad also faced internal turmoil due to the disobedience of local zamindars, who raided and plundered villages. Starting in 1691 however, the governor and other Hyderabad officials began to be able to win battles with these zamindars. In 1692, the Maratha raids largely came to an end, as the focus of the Mughal-Maratha war shifted to Gingee. These factors ushered in a period of relative peace in the province of Hyderabad for the next seven years, as Hyderabad's officials tried to forge conciliatory relationships with the zamindars and deshmukhs of the province, to some success. However, the Hyderabad administration was unsuccessful in incorporating the Telugu chiefs and warrior class into the Mughal order.

Jan Sipar Khan served as governor for twelve years, following which he died in office. Aurangzeb appointed his son Kam Bakhsh as the new governor. Kam Bakhsh served in absentee, though he maintained an active interest in Hyderabad Subah due to the several wealthy jagirs he owned in the region. In his stead, Jan Sipar Khan's son Rustam Dil Khan was appointed as deputy, making him the effective governor of the province. Beginning in 1700, Hyderabad Subah faced several raids again by Marathas, in addition to other local chiefs. Rustam Dil Khan was unable to respond to these challenges to Mughal authority - this apparent weakness also led banditry to become a prevalent issue in the province. All these resulted in a negative impact on the economy and revenue, as well as a breakdown in the local administration. Aurangzeb reduced Rustam Dil Khan's rank in punishment, and later even removed him from his post. He was returned to his post as effective governor in 1706, as Aurangzeb found difficulty in appointing officers with experience in the region. Aurangzeb also refused to assign more troops and military resources to Hyderabad Subah, since he needed them for his campaigns in the Deccan. Hence the period began to see an administrative breakdown, as officers of the province began to act in self-preservation rather than in service of the empire.

In 1707, Aurangzeb died, triggering a war of succession. Kam Bakhsh, who with the help of his father had been building authority in Hyderabad Subah, occupied the region and crowned himself independent king of Golconda. Rustam Dil Khan was confirmed in his old position as governor; however, he had been building up vast sums of money in the province during Aurangzeb's reign. When Kam Bakhsh attempted to confiscate this, he was met with resistance from the governor, and so had him executed. Kam Bakhsh in general placed great financial pressure on the province, to secure his position as King of Golconda. However, his brother Shah Alam (recently crowned as Mughal emperor Bahadur Shah, after the defeat of his brother Azam Shah), had been marching southwards to confront him, and in a decisive battle Kam Bakhsh was killed, continuing Hyderabad's status as a subah of the Mughal Empire.

The Mughal hold on Hyderabad was generally tenuous as emperor Bahadur Shah paid more attention to the problematic provinces in the north. The political instability of the previous year made local chiefs, zamindars, deshmukhs and the like to withhold the payment of taxes, leading to a breakdown in provincial administration. Bahadur Shah appointed Yusuf Khan, an Afghan mansabdar and previous faujdar of Kurnool, as governor of the province. The major campaign of his tenure was countering the notorious bandit Papadu (sarvai Papanna), who had risen to power and status during the war of succession following Aurangzeb's death. Yusuf Khan was able to defeat Papadu, a highly publicized event in the empire. Yusuf Khan went on to deal with other rebellious local chiefs; however, his tenure was financially unstable, as his military campaigns did not yield enough money to fund themselves, and payments to his troops remained in arrears. Yusuf Khan died in 1711, following which the position of governor was empty for a year - it was eventually filled by Ibrahim Khan, but financial insolvency and administrative breakdown only accelerated.

=== Secession ===
In 1713, Mubariz Khan, a Mughal officer with a long tenure in the northern parts of the empire, was appointed to the governorship by Farrukhsiyar, who was now Mughal emperor. An able administrator, he was able to attack and subdue several unruly zamindars in the province, as well as keep Maratha raids at bay. His practice of military forcefulness compelled these zamindars to pay taxes out of fear, which gave his governorship more security than the preceding ones. As he brought stability to the region, he also began to sever its connections to the empire - he only paid occasional sums to the Mughal central treasury and appointed his own provincial officers. Hence Hyderabad increasingly acted as a power base for Mubariz Khan himself, rather than a subah of the empire. A major factor behind this was not just Mubariz Khan's skill as an administrator, but also the decline of the Mughal Empire itself - the imperial centre had deteriorated to the point that it simply could not enforce its authority on Mubariz Khan's activity.

In 1713, Farrukhsiyar also appointed Chin Qilich Khan (recently titled Nizam-ul Mulk) to the viceroyalty of the Deccan, governor of the six subahs of the Mughal Deccan. He served this post for the second time in the period 1720–1722, during which time he also began to consolidate his authority in the region. He came at odds with Mubariz Khan, who was a challenge to his authority in Hyderabad subah, but briefly left for Delhi to serve as wazir. In 1724, the Nizam returned to the Deccan with the intent of establishing an independent kingdom, and defeated Mubariz Khan in the Battle of Shakar Kheda with Maratha support.

In the period following 1724, and before the Nizam died in 1748, Hyderabad seceded from the Mughal empire, as the Deccan increasingly fell under the personal control of the Nizam. Scholars typically date Hyderabad's independence to 1724 (the year of the Battle of Shakar Kheda) or 1740 (the year the Nizam permanently settled in the Deccan; prior, he would be called to North India intermittently by the Mughal emperor).

== Administration ==
The administrative structure of Hyderabad Subah was similar to other subahs of the Mughal Empire. The province was divided into twenty districts, administered from the capital city of Hyderabad. The capital was home to the governor (subahdar), who was the highest-ranking official in the province; he directly represented the emperor and was responsible for political order. The province also had a diwan, who was the chief fiscal officer of the province, and a bakhshi, who was responsible for maintaining the Mughal cavalry and enforcing the military obligations of mansabdars. Territorial administration was done by nine faujdars, who were stationed across the province; they maintained public order at the district level. The province contained several strategic Qutb Shahi forts, which were each commanded by a Mughal mansabdar.

=== Administrative divisions ===
Districts of Hyderabad Subah
	District	No. of Parganas
Telangana	Muhammadnagar (capital district)	12
Telangana	Bhongir	11
Telangana	Devarkonda	13
Telangana	Elgandel	21
Telangana	Ghanpura	9
Telangana	Kaulas	5
Telangana	Khammamett	11
Telangana	Koilkonda	13
Telangana	Malankur	3
Telangana	Medak	13
Telangana	Nalgonda	5
Telangana	Pangal	5
Telangana	Warangal	16
Andhra	Eluru	11
Andhra	Machilipatnam	8
Andhra	Murtazanagar	5
Andhra	Mustafanagar	24
Andhra	Nizampatnam	1
Andhra	Rajmundry	24
Andhra	Sikakul	1

== Economy ==
Mughal Hyderabad saw several fiscal changes, many of which aligned Hyderabad with the rest of the Mughal Empire. Its currency was changed from the local gold standard to the Mughal silver rupee. Aurangzeb imposed the jizya (religious tax on non-Muslims) as part of his annexation, which the Qutb Shahis had never levied, placing a financial burden on non-Muslims but benefitting the empire's tax collection. He went on to discontinue the jizya in 1704 in response to Maratha raids.

The Mughals ended tax-farming (ijarah), which had been the predominant taxation system in the Sultanate era, and instead introduced a tax-collection system that conformed more to Mughal standards; it relied on more centralized revenue assessment and collection in cash, though it was not as bureaucratic or directly enforced as it was in the Mughal heartland provinces (such as Delhi, Agra, Lahore or Allahabad). The system of jagirs was also put in place in Hyderabad. Diamond mines, which had been the Golconda Sultans' famed source of wealth, had stopped functioning following the conquest of Hyderabad, but in 1692 mining was restarted in service of the Mughals.

Many of these changes led Hyderabad Subah to economically recover from the Mughal conquest and become self-financing; however, it did not reach the amount of profitability it had during the Qutb Shahi era. Aurangzeb left many fiscal systems in the region untouched (such as the functioning of the ports, and mines) to gain enough short-term revenue to finance his armies in the Deccan, losing out on the possibility of implementing a deeper agrarian system in the region similar to other Mughal subahs, and fully utilizing the resources of Hyderabad.

== Culture ==
=== Art ===
The Mughal conquest of Hyderabad ended the role of the Qutb Shahi sultans as patrons of art in the region. However, the Mughal emperor did not fill this role, as he was absent from Hyderabad - instead, the governor, faujdars, and other Mughal officials became sources of artistic patronage. During the era of Hyderabad Subah (1687-1724), Hyderabad remained a leading centre of art; portraiture was very popular, and a new style of painting emerged that combined northern and Deccani styles.

=== Religion ===
The annexation of Hyderabad led to the import of northern religious strains into Hyderabad; two disciples of popular Delhi Sufi saint Shah Kalimallah (Shah Yusuf al-din Qadiri and Shah Sharaf al-din Qadiri) arrived in Hyderabad with Aurangzeb's armies and established a shrine in the capital, which became a sacred site of the city. Additionally, the Mughals brought a degree of Sunni prejudice to the region, which had historically been ruled by the Shia Qutb Shahis. For example, in the aftermath of the conquest, the Badshahi Ashurkhana, a Shia religious site in Hyderabad city, was desecrated. Another Shiite site in the capital, the Mawla Ali shrine, stopped receiving religious patronage.

== Bibliography ==
- Richards, John F. (1975a), Mughal Administration in Golconda, Oxford [England]: Clarendon Press, ISBN 0-19-821561-4, OCLC 2932290
- Eaton, Richard Maxwell (2005), A social history of the Deccan, 1300-1761: eight Indian lives, Cambridge, UK: Cambridge University Press, ISBN 0-521-25484-1, OCLC 58431679
