= Sarvayi Papadu =

17th-century Indian king

Papadu
- Born: 18 August 1650; Khilashapur village, Raghunathpalle Mandal, Jangaon district, Telangana
- Died: 1709/1710
- Parent(s): Sarvamma, Darshanna Goud

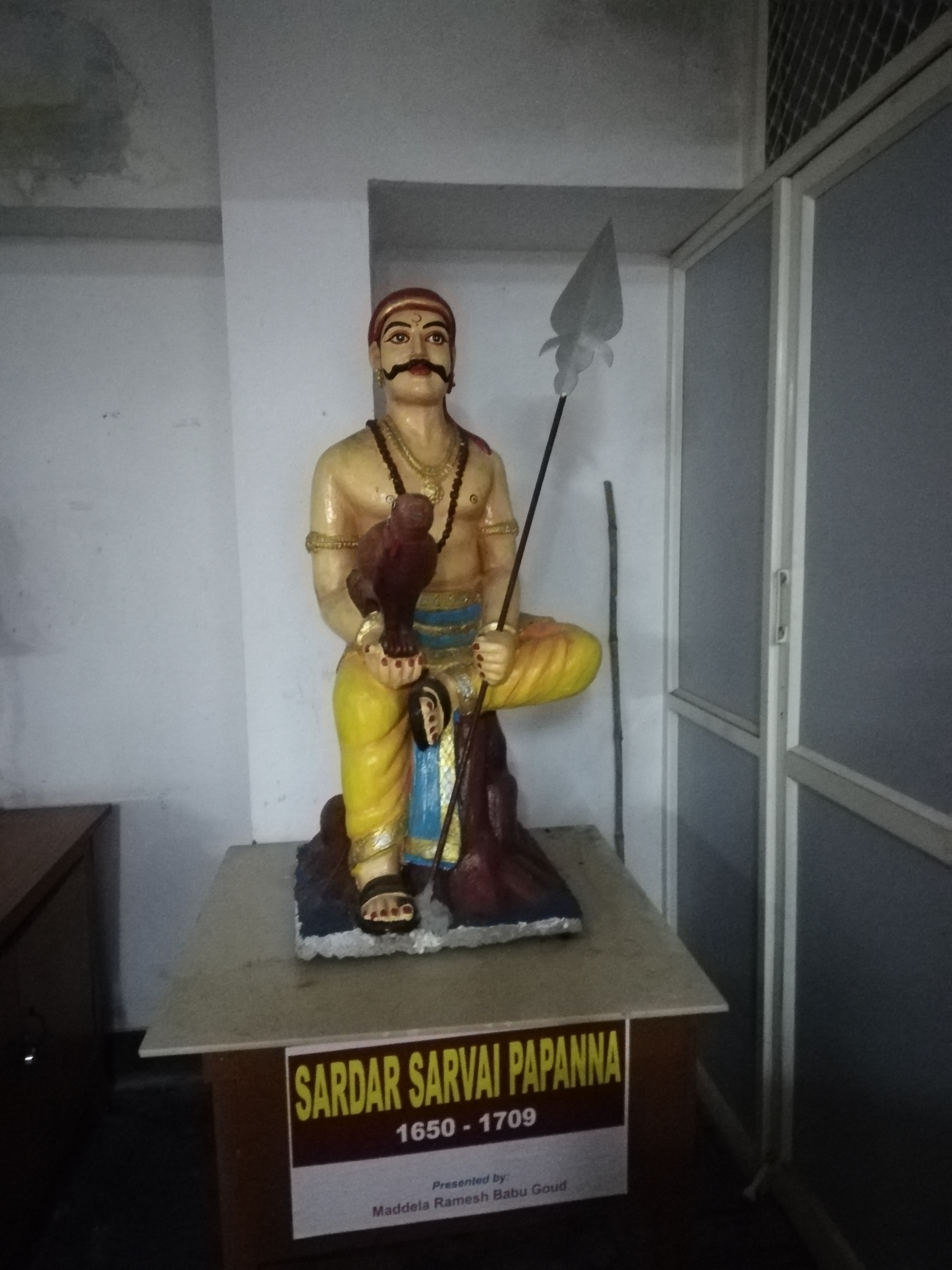
Statue of Sarvayi Papadu

Sarvayi Papadu (18 August 1650 - 2 April 1710), also known as Sarvai Papanna, was a Telugu bandit chieftain and folk hero.

== Early life ==
Born to a Telugu family in 1650, Papadu was raised by his widowed mother, Sarvamma. After working as a cattle herder in his youth, he followed her advice and entered his traditional caste profession (kulavrithi) as a toddy tapper.

The mutual respect that ensued enabled Golkonda to become an extremely wealthy region, as evidenced by the construction of Hyderabad. However, by the 1630s it was apparent that troubles lay ahead. Shah Jahan, who was the Mughal emperor at Delhi, began to exact tribute from the Qutb Shahi sultan and then sent his son, Aurangzeb, to represent him in Golkonda. Aurangzeb eventually succeeded in conquering Hyderabad and gaining total control of the region in 1687, making it the last of the independent sultanates to be annexed to the Mughal Empire. Many changes followed this event, and they generally caused a reduction in the influence of those people who had once been notable within Golkonda. Furthermore, the conquest had caused or coincided with crop failures, famine, cholera epidemics and other disasters, between 1686 and 1690, while the post-conquest era saw Aurangzeb bleeding Golkonda of its wealth in order to finance projects elsewhere.

=== Rise ===
Papadu had no desire to remain a toddy-tapper and his refusal to work in the traditional occupation of his caste was one of his early acts of defiance. It has been speculated that the contradiction between the position of his caste and the roles in society that his father, brother and sister may have attained could explain Papadu's refusal to accept the restrictive ritualised norms. That he later married a woman who was almost certainly not of a toddy-tapper caste, since she was the sister of a faujdar (military governor), is also a possible indicator of this.

In the 1690s he stole money and property from his wealthy widowed sister, assaulting her in the process. With these funds he built a hill-fort at Tatikonda and drew a band of men around him who were willing to become highwaymen, and then proceeded to rob traders who used the nearby route between Hyderabad and Warangal, the erstwhile capital of Golkonda. The bandits did not stay at Tarikonda for long: the disruption and loss caused by their raids led to them being driven out by the local zamindars (hereditary chieftain-landlords) and faujdars. The opposition of the zamindars was to become a theme of his life, in part because of the destabilising threat that he posed to society and, more specifically, to their own vested interests in inherited lands and the power base implicit in their control of local militias.

Moving over a hundred miles away to Kaulas, Papadu spent a period in the employ of Venkat Rao, a zamindar of that area. It was not long before Rao found it necessary to imprison him, as Papadu's liking for banditry resurfaced, but within months Papadu and all of Rao's other prisoners were freed by the latter's wife, who thought that showing such compassion might cause the health of her sick son to be blessed. Papadu moved to Shahpur, not far from his old haunt at Tarikonda, where he established another hill-fort and again recruited people to pursue his banditry.

It was at this time that he began to kidnap women. The outrage caused by this and by his other disruptive activities caused Aurangzeb to be petitioned in order that something might be done to stop Papadu. A force was sent to serve achieve that end but its faujdar was killed in fighting. The matter was then passed into the hands of Dil Khan, the deputy-governor of Hyderabad, who determined to lay siege on the fort.

Although the siege was successful, forcing Papadu to flee and enabling Khan to blow up the fort, it was not long before the brigands returned. Khan had moved back to Hyderabad and Papadu was able to rebuild the Shahpur fort, this time using a stone construction that was much stronger than the previous edifice. He went on to wage campaigns that resulted in the capture of other local forts and enhanced his growing reputation as a potential regional warlord.

Another imperial attempt to curb Papadu occurred in 1706, when Khan had returned to the region following a posting elsewhere. Khan engaged the services of another bandit, who was probably Riza Khan, to challenge Papadu but the attempt came to naught. A year later, Dil Khan determined to take responsibility for the task himself but again failed. He took a considerable force to Shahpur and laid siege for two months or so, as he had done previously. On this occasion it was money that decided the outcome because Papadu bribed Khan in order to have the siege lifted.

=== Peak ===
Papadu was emboldened by this success. On 31 March 1708 he initiated an attack on the heavily fortified former capital city of Warangal with a force of between 5500 and 6500 men. This action was planned to coincide with the eve of the Muslim celebrations of Ashura, when the city walls would be poorly manned, if at all. In a wider context, the timing was opportunistic as the forces of empire were in some disarray due to a power struggle that had developed upon the death of Aurangzeb in 1707. The city, which had become an important commercial centre, was looted extensively but the larger prize came in the form of the abduction of many wealthy and influential residents, who were then imprisoned at Shahpur in a compound constructed that purpose.

The successful raid on Warangal, with all the riches that resulted from it, propelled Papadu to new heights. He was able to arm his fort and his followers with the latest weaponry and, as Eaton describes:

He also began comporting himself in the style of a raja. Élite bearers carried him around in a palanquin, and an élite guard accompanied him when mounted on a horse. If he acted like a king, he had actually become a parvenu landholder. For we hear that he raided passing Banjaras (itinerant grain carriers) and seized their cattle, which he put to work ploughing his fields for him.

Papadu desired more and raided Bhongir on 1 June 1708, being the occasion of a Muslim festival. Although many hostages were taken – he had promised silver to those who captured females, and gold if they were of high status – the raid was not as successful as that at Warangal, at least in part because an accident caused the insurgents to give away their intentions. Eaton has described it as a "fiasco".

In 1709 Papadu demonstrated his desire for recognition when he attended an audience at Hyderabad with Bahadur Shah I, who by that time was beginning to assert some authority as emperor in the fractious post-Aurangzeb court power struggles. Papadu gave the emperor an array of wealth in his search to be recognised as a tribute-paying chieftain, and he was rewarded with an honorific robe. Loud protests followed this recognition, especially from influential Muslims of the area whose relatives had been kidnapped and people who decried that an emperor would recognise a person of a toddy tapper caste. Eaton describes that the robe "... seemed to represent official acknowledgement of his status as a legitimate, tribute-paying nayaka-zamindar ... Landholders claiming descent from ancient nayaka families were simply incensed at such impudence." Bahadur Shah had to back down and he announced that Papadu would be killed, with the responsibility for achieving this end being given to Dilawar Khan.

=== Fall ===
The beginning of the fall of Papadu can be dated to June 1709. Prisoners at Shahpur – including his brother-in-law, the faujdar – managed to overturn their captors and take possession of the fort while Papadu was besieging another fort elsewhere. Papadu's wife assisted her brother and his fellow captives by smuggling files that they used to free themselves from their chains Simultaneously, Dilawar Khan was advancing on him and, unaware of the situation at Shahpur, Papadu thought it prudent to defend his position by lifting his siege and retreating to his base. When he reached Shahpur he found that the tables were turned on him: he was fired upon by his former captives, using his own cannon, and with the imminent arrival of Khan he was forced to take refuge in the very compound that he had constructed to imprison them. Finding his position there to be untenable, and facing the desertion of some of his own forces, he decamped to the fort at Tatikonda, leaving Khan to take control of the wealth within Shahpur in accordance with instructions of his superior, the governor of Hyderabad.

Yusuf Khan, the Hyderabad governor, sent a force of several thousand to besiege Tatikonda and this became a prolonged affair, lasting until March 1710. At that point, Yusuf Khan determined to take personal charge, doubling the number of imperial forces to around 26,000 and being further aided by the provision of at least 36,000 soldiers – cavalry and infantry – supplied by local landowners. This concentration of support from Hindu chieftains, together with the fact that they were the first to oppose him when he was originally based at Tatikonda and evidence that he attacked both Muslims and Hindus, demonstrate that Papadu's motivations and the popular support for them were not based on religious considerations. Claims that he was a "Hindu warrior" are further negated by analysis of the names of his followers noted in the ballads, which appear to demonstrate that those within his group included Muslims and non-Hindu tribal peoples in almost equal proportion to Hindus.

Despite the considerable forces set against him at Tatikonda, it was bribery that caused significant losses for Papadu: his men, by now weary, hungry and demoralised, were tempted to defect by offers of double pay made in May. The final straw was when Papadu ran out of gunpowder and was forced to flee in disguise. Although wounded, he was able to reach the village of Hasanabad before being betrayed by a toddy tapper and captured by the brother-in-law who had previously been his prisoner. He was executed a few days later. The traditional accounts say that the method of execution was that of decapitation, and that thereafter his body was cut into pieces and his head sent to Delhi.

Though Sarvayi Papadu initially built an army of 30,000 soldiers, it eventually divided due to casteism among the ranks.

Richards and Rao refer to Papadu's attempt as a "dual rebellion" and that phrase has been used subsequently by the Metcalfs, among others. They say that in leading such a rebellion "against both imperial and local chiefly authority, Papadu struck too boldly at the most basic ordering of society, and thus mobilized against him all those with a stake in the established hierarchies of caste and wealth."

== Popular culture ==
Aside from the folklore upon which much of the knowledge regarding Papadu relies, there has been at least one film production telling his story: Sardar Papanna, directed by Pratani Ramakrishna Goud and starring Krishna, was released in 2006.
