= Sat Gambuj Mosque =

Sunni mosque and tomb complex in Dhaka, Bangladesh

- সাত গম্বুজ মসজিদ
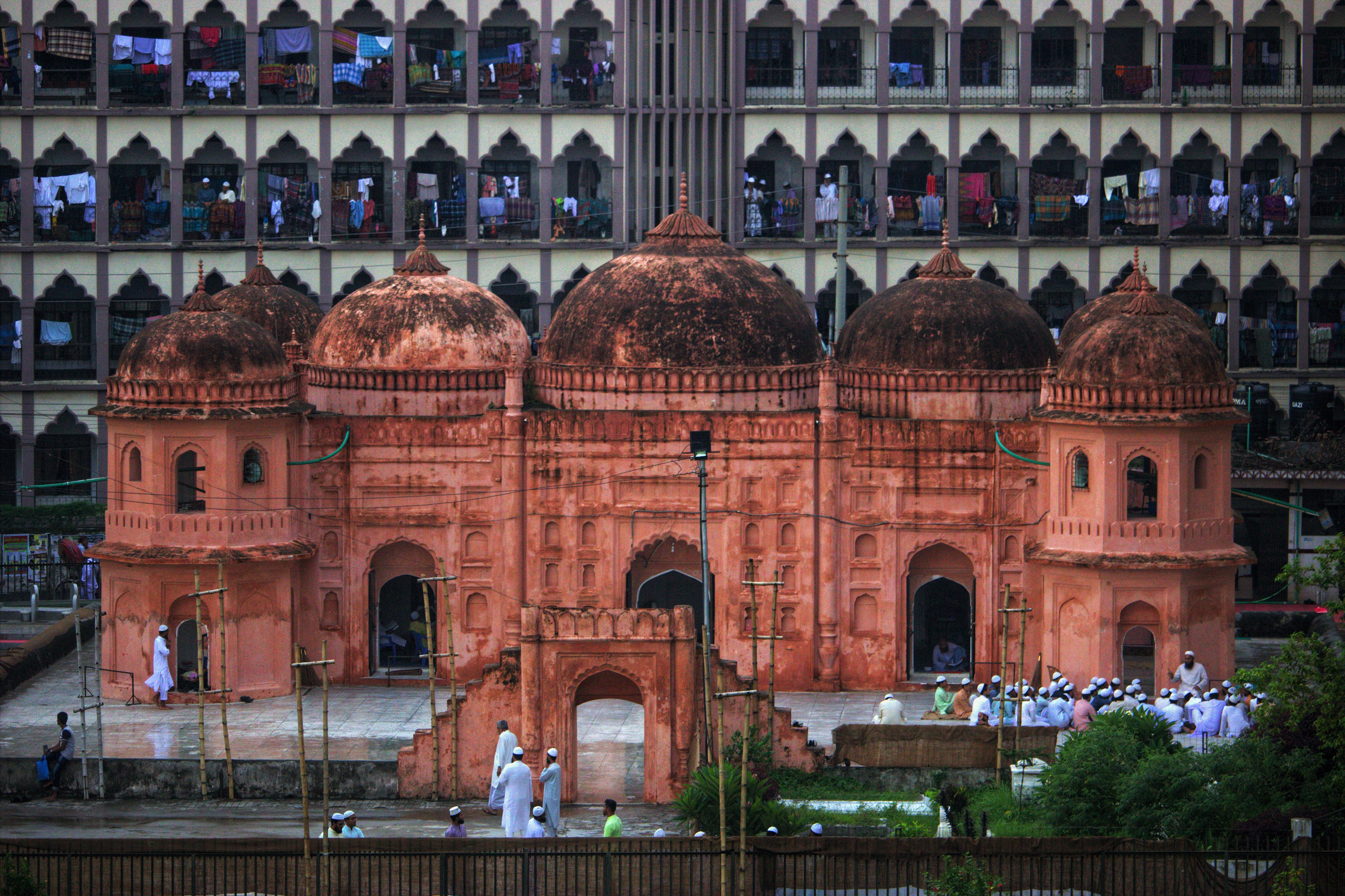

- Location of the mosque in Dhaka

Religion
- Affiliation: Sunni Islam
- Ecclesiastical or organisational status: Mosque and mausoleum
- Status: Active

Location
- Location: Mohammadpur, Dhaka, Dhaka District
- Country: Bangladesh
- Administration: Department of Archaeology
- Coordinates: 23°45′28″N 90°21′33″E

Architecture
- Type: Mosque architecture
- Style: Islamic; Mughal
- Completed: c. 1684 CE

Specifications
- Dome: Seven
- Shrine: One

The Sat Gambuj Mosque (Bengali: সাত গম্বুজ মসজিদ, lit. 'Seven Domed Mosque') is a Sunni mosque and tomb complex located near the northwestern outskirts of Dhaka in the Mohammadpur area, in the Dhaka District of Bangladesh. The mosque is a fine example of the provincial Mughal-style architecture introduced in the 17th century in what is now Bangladesh. The mosque's most notable features are its seven bulbous domes crowning the roof and covering the main prayer hall. The monument stands in a romantic setting on a buttressed 4.6-metre-high (15 ft) bank overlooking an extensive flood plain. The mosque dates from the reign of Mughal emperor Aurangzeb. It may have been built by the Mughal governor Shaista Khan.

== History ==
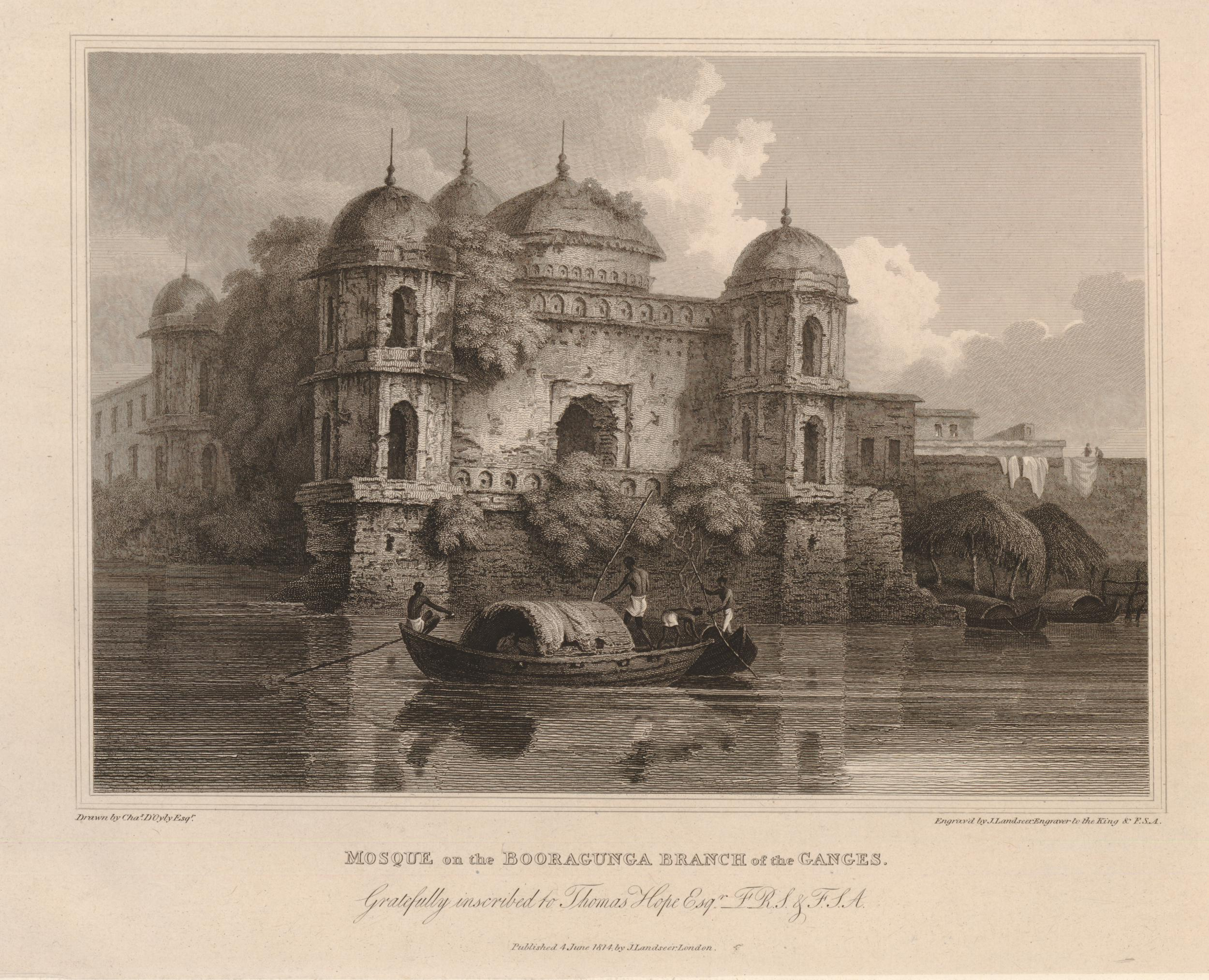
An etching of Sat Gambuj Mosque beside Buriganga River by Sir Charles D'Oyly in 1814

The mosque is one of several in Dhaka built during the reign of Mughal emperor Aurangzeb. Its construction is traditionally attributed to Shaista Khan, Mughal governor of Bengal in the period 1678–1684; however, there are no inscriptions on the structure that attest to this.

== Architecture ==
Picturesquely situated on the edge of a river, the Shat Cumbuj Mosque's exterior is the most innovative of all the Dhaka Mughal-period monuments. The north and south ends of this three-domed rectangular mosque are each marked by two enormous double-storied corner pavilions; when viewed from the east, these give the impression that the mosque has five exterior bays. On the east are three cusped entrance arches flanked by shallow niches. Slender engaged columns with bulbous bases demarcate the central bay (as seen at the Lalbagh Fort Mosque, although this mosque's colonettes are more prominent).

Its interior compares favourably with that of others dating to the second half of the 16th century. The central mihrab has two rows of cusping, and its surface is embellished with moulded plaster relief, recalling the ornateness of the mihrab in the mosque of Haji Khwaja Shahbaz.

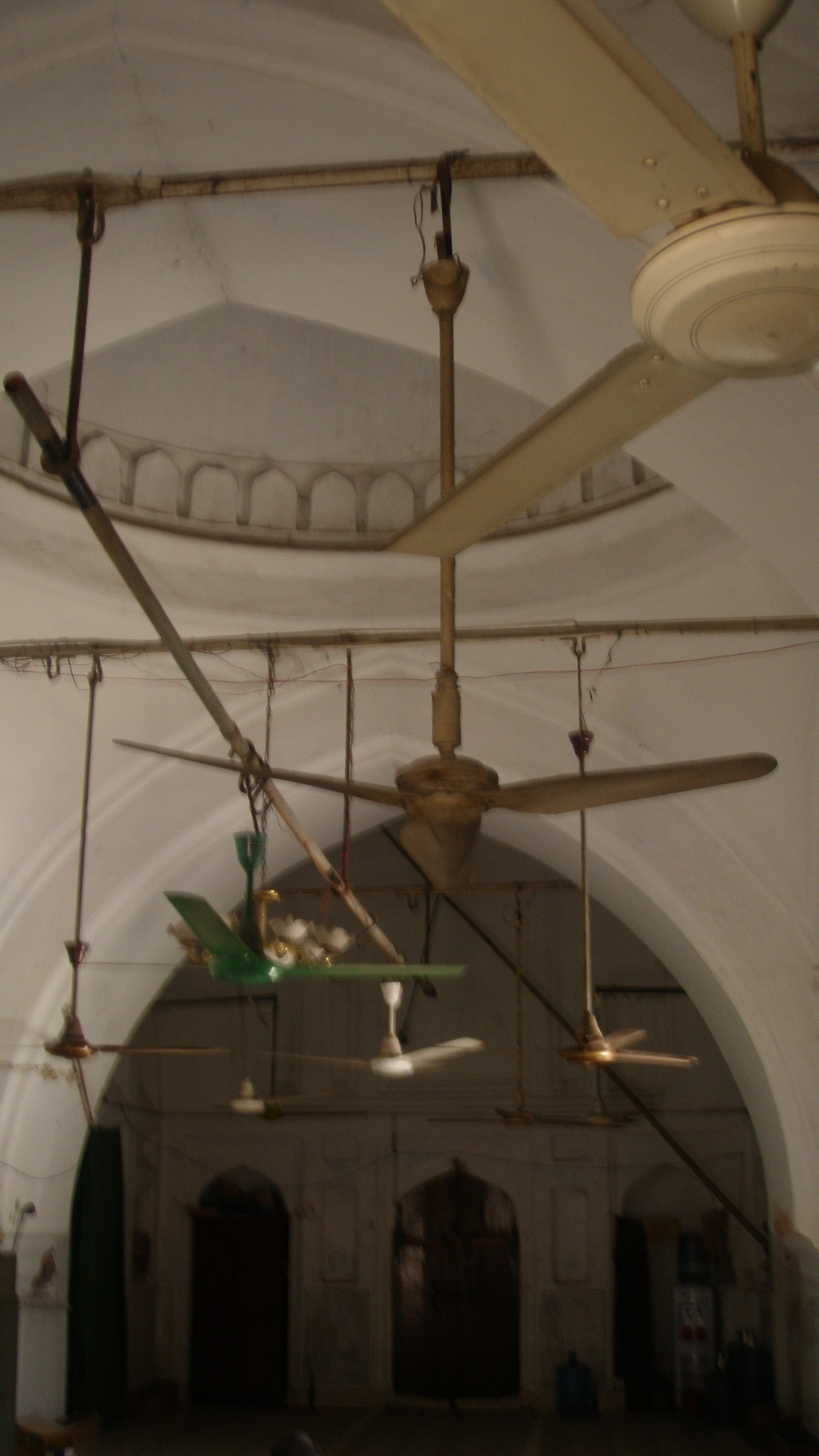
Interior

== See also ==
- Islam in Bangladesh
- List of mosques in Bangladesh
- List of archaeological sites in Bangladesh
- Bengali Muslims
