= Ruhullah Khan =

17th-century Mughal Empire paymaster-general

Mir Bakhshi of the Mughal Empire
- In office 1686–1692
- Monarch: Aurangzeb
- Preceded by: Ashraf Khan
- Succeeded by: Bahramand Khan

Subahdar of Hyderabad
- Monarch: Aurangzeb
- Preceded by: Muhammad Ibrahim
- Succeeded by: Jan Sipar Khan

Personal details
- Died: 1691/1692
- Children: Saif Ullah Khan; Ruhullah Khan II; Bairam Khan Muhammad Baqir; Aisha Begum
- Parent(s): Khalilullah Khan; Hamida Banu

Military service
- Battles/wars: Siege of Bijapur (1695–1686); Siege of Golconda (1687); Siege of Raichur (1689)

Ruhullah Khan (d. 1691/1692) was one of the highest-ranking nobles of the Mughal Empire during the reign of Mughal emperor Aurangzeb. He is known for his tenure as the mir bakhshi (paymaster-general) of the empire during the latter's rule. He actively participated in Aurangzeb's military campaigns in the Deccan frontier, such as the Siege of Bijapur (1685–1686) and Siege of Golconda (1687). He served as the subahdar (governor) of Mughal Hyderabad in the province's nascent stages.

== Personal life ==
Ruhullah Khan was the son of Khalilullah Khan and Hamida Banu. He was of Iranian descent. His mother was a sister of emperor Aurangzeb's mother, making him well-connected in the Mughal nobility. Ruhullah Khan was a Shia Muslim; Shi'ism was viewed with hostility by the Sunni Aurangzeb and most nobles of the court. Ruhullah Khan had a daughter named Aisha Begum, who was married to the Mughal prince Azim-us-Shan. He also had a son named Mir Hasan, who bore the titles Khanazad Khan and Ruhullah Khan successively.

== Career ==
Ruhullah Khan was the empire's Khan-i-Saman (superintendent of the royal household) from 1676 to 1678. In 1685, he participated in the Siege of Bijapur, acting as one of the two commanders of the siege army. He began siege operations alongside Qasim Khan on the first of April. The siege progressed slowly, and eventually Aurangzeb sent both commanders to other missions; Ruhullah Khan was sent to Ahmadnagar in July.

In 1686, Ruhullah Khan was made mir bakhshi (paymaster-general) of the empire, succeeding Ashraf Khan. He would hold this post until his death in 1692, after which the post was filled by Bahramand Khan.

In 1687, Ruhullah Khan was called to offer relief midway in the siege of Golconda, since the siege was moving to little success. He brought reinforcements on July 10 with the Mughal prince Azam Shah. When the fort was later betrayed by a Golconda noble, Ruhullah Khan led the party that stormed the fort and captured Abul Hasan Qutb Shah, ruler of the kingdom. Following the capture and conquest of Golconda, a Mughal administration was instated in the new province. Two months after the conquest, Ruhullah Khan was made governor of the province, replacing a former Golconda noble named Muhammad Ibrahim. He served for less than a year before Jan Sipar Khan was appointed as a more permanent governor.

In 1689, following the Mughal occupation of the Bedar territories, Ruhullah Khan was deputed to capture Raichur fort, which was under the control of a Bedar chief. Its capture required a siege that began on the 10th of July and ended successfully on the 29th of November. Ruhullah Khan sent the fort's chief to Hyderabad, where the latter was executed. In May 1691, as Bedar power grew and centered at Wakinkera Fort under Pidia Nayak, Ruhullah Khan was deputed to besiege the fort. He led a failed assault against the fort, followed by an unsuccessful two-month siege. He then opened negotiations with Pidia Nayak, which lasted to the end of 1691. Ruhullah Khan was subsequently withdrawn from the field by Aurangzeb, who sent a new force to attack the fort.

== Death ==
Ruhullah Khan died around the years 1691/1692; historian Jadunath Sarkar estimated around June 1692. The emperor Aurangzeb personally visited Ruhullah Khan as he ailed on his deathbed. A primary source of Aurangzeb's reign relates an anecdote that on his deathbed, Ruhullah Khan insisted on converting from the Shi'ite faith to Sunnism; he asked emperor Aurangzeb to marry his two daughters to Sunnis, and have his last rites performed by a Sunni qazi. Upon the arrival of the qazi, Ruhullah Khan secretly requested that the last rites be performed by a Shia associate of his instead; this news was relayed to the emperor, who permitted this but expressed his indignation at Ruhullah Khan's deception. Ruhullah Khan had married a daughter of Shaista Khan Amir-ul-Umara, the governor of Bengal. His oldest son, Saif Ullah Khan died early. His second son, Ruhullah Khan II, was the superintendent of the Diwan-i-khas. Ruhullah Khan II died in 1704 leaving two sons: Khalilullah Khan and Itiqad Khan, and a daughter. His third son Bairam Khan Muhammad Baqir was given some fiefs.
