= Shaista Khan =

Mughal noble and Subahdar (1600–1694)

Mirza Abu-Talib Shaista Khan
- Amir al-umara Subahdar
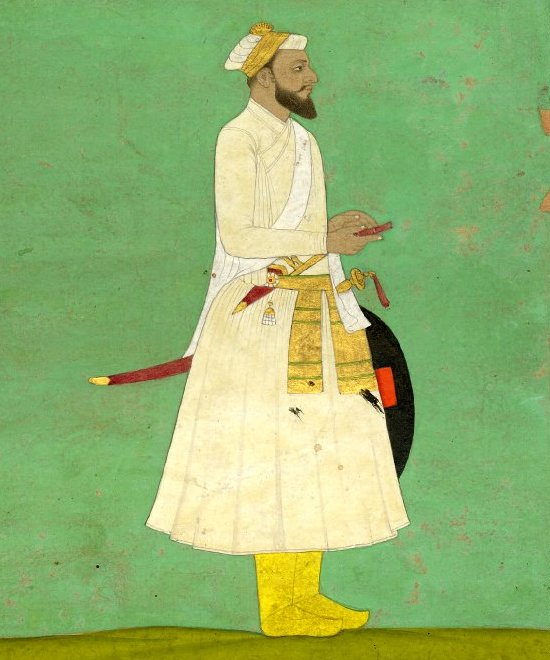
- Shaista Khan in c. 1650

24th & 27th Subahdar of Bengal
- 1st Governorship: 30 March 1664 – 1676
- Predecessor: Mir Jumla II
- Successor: Fidai Khan II
- 2nd Governorship: 1680 – 1688
- Predecessor: Azam Shah
- Successor: Ibrahim Khan II
- Badshah: Aurangzeb

Subahdar of Khandesh Subah
- Governorship: 1658 – 1669
- Badshah: Aurangzeb

Viceroy of the Deccan
- Governorship: January 1660 – mid-January 1664
- Badshah: Aurangzeb
- Born: Mirza Abu Talib; 22 November 1600; Delhi, Mughal Empire
- Died: c. 1694 (aged 93–94); Delhi, Mughal Empire
- Issue: Buzurg Umed Khan; Abul Fatah; Iran Dukht Rahmat Banu (Bibi Pari); Aqidat Khan; Jafar Khan; Abu Nasr Khan; Iradat Khan; Khuda Banda Khan
Names
- Mirza Abu-Talib Shaista Khan ibn Abu'l-Hasan Asaf Khan
- Father: Asaf Khan IV
- Mother: Diwanji Begum
- Religion: Shia Islam
- Occupation: Mughal Statesman

Mirza Abu Talib (b. 22 November 1600 – d. 1694), better known as Shaista Khan, was a general and the Subahdar of Bengal Subah. He was maternal uncle to the Mughal Emperor Aurangzeb, and acted as a key figure during his reign. Shaista Khan initially governed the Deccan, where he clashed with the Maratha ruler Shivaji and was humiliated by him. However, he was most notable for his tenure as the governor of Bengal from 1664 to 1688. Under Shaista Khan's authority, the city of Dhaka and Mughal power in the province attained their greatest heights. His achievements include construction of notable mosques such as the Sat Gambuj Mosque and masterminding the conquest of Chittagong. Shaista Khan was also responsible for sparking the Anglo-Mughal War with the East India Company.

== Early life ==
According to the diary of William Hedges, the first governor of the East India Company in Bengal, the birthday of Shaista Khan was on 22 November.

Khan was of Persian origin. His grandfather Mirza Ghiyas Beg and father Abu'l-Hasan Asaf Khan were the wazirs of the Mughal emperors Jahangir and Shah Jahan, respectively. He also had familial connections with the imperial dynasty, having been a paternal nephew of the empress Nur Jahan and the brother of the empress Mumtaz Mahal. Jahangir awarded the title of Mirza to Shaista Khan in recognition of his family's service and position in the Mughal court.

Khan trained and served with the Mughal army and court, winning multiple promotions and being appointed governor of various provinces. He also developed a reputation as a successful military commander and grew close to his nephew, the prince Aurangzeb, when the duo fought against the Sultanate of Golconda.

== Confrontation with the Marathas ==
After Aurangzeb's accession to the Mughal throne in 1659, he appointed Shaista Khan as viceroy of the Deccan with a large army to enforce the treaty the Mughals had signed with the Adilshahi of Bijapur. Through the treaty, the Sultanate of Bijapur had ceded territory that it had previously captured from the Ahmadnagar Sultanate to the Mughals. However, the territory was also fiercely contested by the ruler of the Shivaji Maharaj, who had acquired a big reputation after him killing of Adilshahi general Afzal Khan in the Battle of Pratapgarh. In January 1660, Shaista Khan arrived at Aurangabad and quickly advanced, seizing Pune, the centre of Shivaji's realm. He also captured the fort of Chakan and Kalyan and north Konkan after heavy fighting with the Marathas. The Marathas were banned from entering the city of Pune, and Mughal distance from the locals turned out to be an error. Shaista was responsible for heavily mass destruct pune city and its innocent civilians.

=== Attack by Shivaji Maharaj on Shaista in Pune ===
On the evening of 5 April 1663, a wedding reception had obtained special permission for holding a procession. Shivaji and many of his men disguised as the bridegroom's procession members and some as Mughal soldiers entered Pune where in the Lal Mahal Shaista Khan was residing. Others entered in small parties dressed as labourers and soldiers of Maratha generals serving under Shaista Khan. After midnight, they raided the Nawab's compound and then entered the palace in an attempt to assassinate him. Maharaj Shivaji himself faced Shaista Khan directly, Shaista Khan in fear to save his life jumped out of a window in an attempt to escape but during this Shivaji Maharaj cut off 3 fingers of Shaista Khan. Though Shaista escaped this event, it heavily damaged his reputation and was humiliating for him

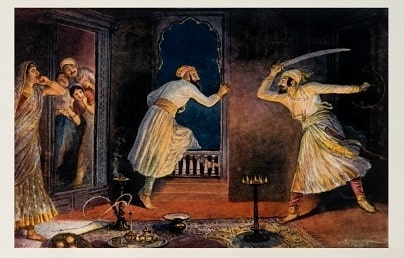
A 20th-century depiction of Maharaj Shivaji (right) attacking Shaista Khan as he tries to flee by artist M.V. Dhurandhar

After this event Aurangzeb angrily transferred Shaista Khan to Bengal, refusing to give him an audience at the time of the transfer, as per custom.

== Subahdar of Bengal ==
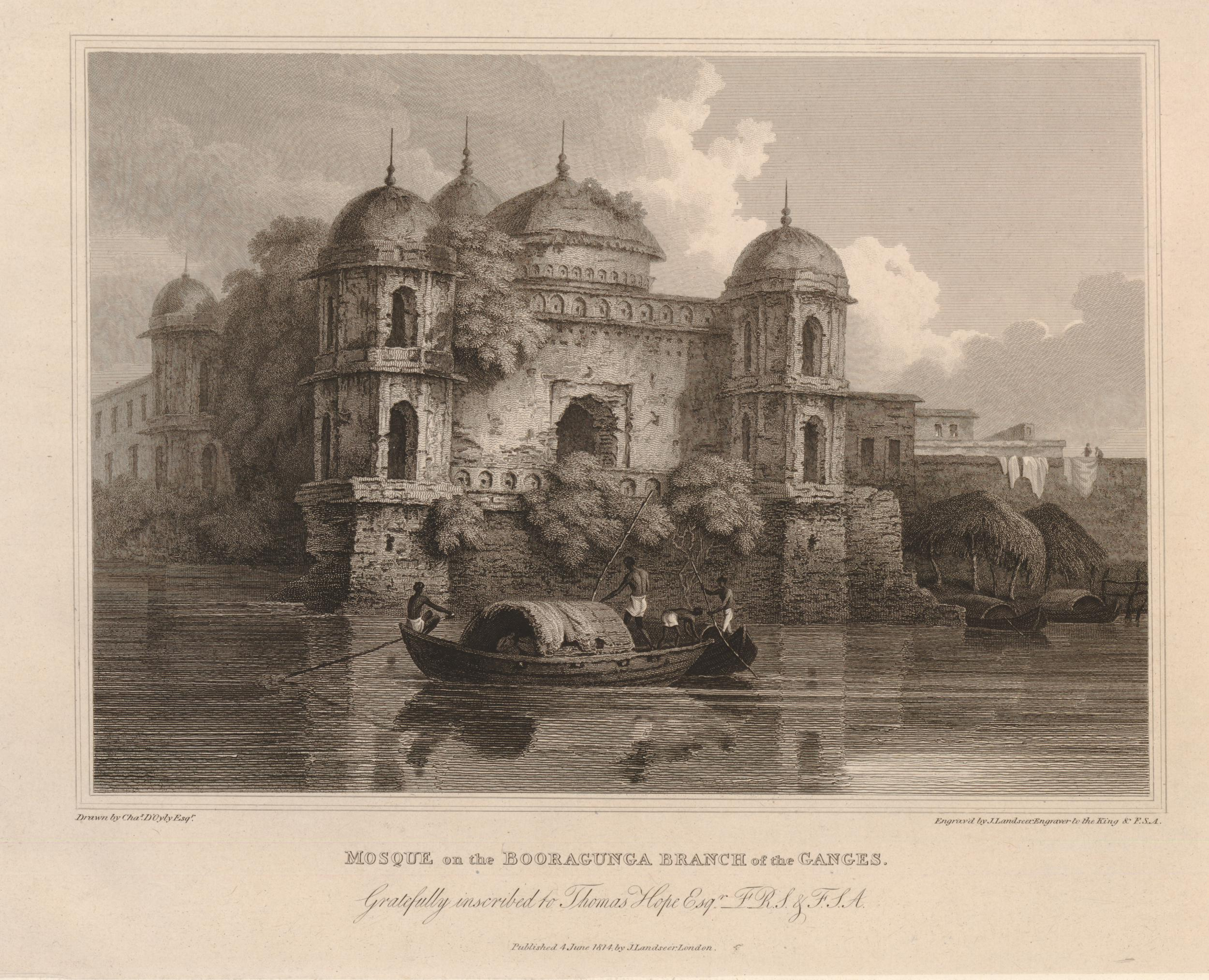
Construction of Sat Gambuj Mosque is credited to Shaista Khan

On the death of Mir Jumla II in 1663, Shaista Khan was appointed the Subahdar of Bengal. As governor, he encouraged trade with Europe, Southeast Asia, and other parts of India. He consolidated his power by signing trade agreements with European powers. Despite his powerful position, he remained loyal to Aurangzeb, often mediating trade disputes and rivalries. In 1666, Shaista Khan led the campaign to Chittagong and expelled the Portuguese and Magh defenders with 300 flotillas. The Mughal forces even forced the Portuguese in Sandwip Island to relinquish their bases to be used as Mughal naval operation. Later, he banned the East India Company from Bengal in 1686, beginning the Anglo-Mughal War. In 1678, Muhammad Azam Shah was appointed the Subahdar of Bengal. In 1680, Shaista Khan was again appointed as the Subedar of Bengal. He served his first term from 1663 to 1678 and his second term from 1680 to 1688.

=== Construction projects ===
Shaista Khan encouraged the construction of modern townships and public works in Dhaka, leading to a massive urban and economic expansion. He was a patron of the arts and encouraged the construction of majestic monuments across the province, including mosques, mausoleums, and palaces that represented the finest in Indo-Saracenic and Mughal architecture. Khan greatly expanded Lalbagh Fort, Chowk Bazaar Mosque, Sat Gambuj Mosque, and Choto Katra. He also supervised the construction of the mausoleum for his daughter Pari Bibi.

== Conquest of Chittagong ==
Upon his arrival in Bengal, Shaista Khan was faced with putting down the Arakanese pirates. He began by rebuilding the Mughal navy, increasing its Bengal fleet to 300 battle-ready ships within a year. He made diplomatic efforts to gain the support of the Dutch East India Company as well as Portugal. With the direct support of the Dutch army, Shaista Khan led the Mughals in an attack on the Arakanese held Sandwip under the command of Ibn Husain, which lay in Arakanese control. The previous Siege of Hooghly by Shaishta Khan was considered by Saugata Bhaduri, a professor from Jawaharlal Nehru University, as an attempt by the empire to threaten the Portuguese settlers in Bengal to assist them in the conquest of Chittagong.

Mughal forces succeeded in capturing the island in November 1665.

Shaista Khan gained a considerable advantage when a conflict erupted between the Arakanese and the Portuguese. The Portuguese, led by Captain Moor, set fire to Arakanese fleets and fled to Bhulua, where Thanadar Farhad Khan gave them refuge. Farhad then sent them off to Shaista. By promptly offering protection and support, Shaista secured the aid of the Portuguese against the Arakanese.

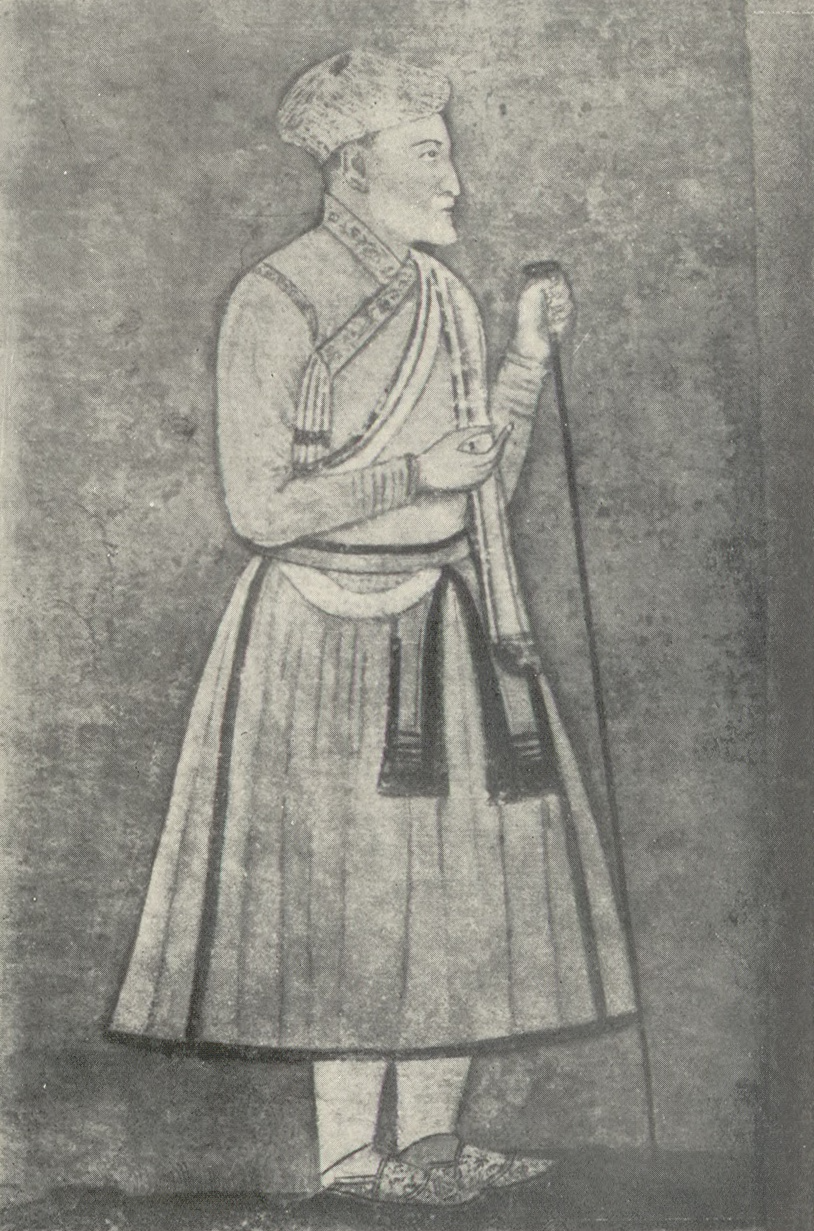
Shaista Khan in later days

In December 1665, Shaista Khan launched a major military campaign against Chittagong, which was the mainstay of the Arakanese kingdom. The imperial fleet consisted of 288 vessels of their own and about 40 vessels of the Firingis (Portuguese) as auxiliaries. Ibn Hussain, Shaista Khan's admiral, was asked to lead the navy, while the subahdar himself took up the responsibility of supplying provisions for the campaign. He also ordered Farhad Khan and Mir Murtaza to take the land route. The overall command was given to Buzurg Ummed Khan, a son of Shaista Khan. The Mughals and the Portuguese held sway in the following naval battle. The conquered territory to the western bank of Kashyapnadi (Kaladan River) was placed under direct imperial administration. The name of Chittagong was changed to Islamabad, and it became the headquarters of a Mughal faujdar. Khan also reasserted Mughal control over Cooch Behar and Kamarupa.

== Personal life ==
According to Shaista Khan's vasiat-nama (a document registered before his death), he had seven sons and five daughters at the time. Among his daughters were Iran Dukht Begum known as Bibi Pari, Turan Dukht Begum known as Bibi Biban and Shamshad Banu Begum. His oldest son, Buzurg Umed Khan, served as the governor of Allahabad. Another of Shaista Khan's sons, Khuda Banda Khan was married to a daughter of the grand vizier Asad Khan. He served as a general for Muhammad Azam Shah, and fell in battle fighting Bahadur Shah I. Khuda Banda's son, who was also entitled Khuda Banda Khan, was made the Diwan of Asaf Jah I, the Nizam of Hyderabad. One of his daughters was married to Ruhullah Khan, son of Khalilullah Khan of Yazd in 1660. Another daughter was married in 1678 to Zulfiqar Khan Nusrat Jung, son of Asad Khan and Mihr-un-Nissa Begum, daughter of Asaf Khan. Another daughter was married to Itiqad Khan and died in 1688.

== Legacy ==
In his late years, Shaista Khan left Dhaka and returned to Delhi. His legacy was the expansion of Dhaka into a regional centre of trade, politics and culture; a thriving and prosperous city from a small township. It is said that he made currency of Bangladeshi taka so strong that eight 'mon' (around 295 kilogram) processed rice or 'chaal' could be bought with one taka. The Shaista Khan Mosque is a massive standing monument to Shaista Khan, built on his palace grounds. Incorporating unique elements of Bengali and Mughal architecture, it is a major tourist attraction and a valued historical monument protected by the government of Bangladesh today.

== Popular culture ==
=== Films and television ===
- In the 1974 Indian historical film Raja Shiv Chhatrapati , he is portrayed by Chandrashekhar Vaidya.
- In the 2008-2009 Indian historical TV serial Raja Shivchhatrapati, he is portrayed by Sunil Godse.
- In the 2019 Indian Marathi historical film Fatteshikast, he is portrayed by Anup Soni.

== See also ==
- List of rulers of Bengal
- History of Dhaka

== Bibliography ==
- Karim, Abdul (1992). History of Bengal: Mughal Period. University of Rajshahi.
- Duff, James Grant (1921) [First published 1826]. History of the Mahrattas. Vol. 1 (Revised Annotated ed.). London: Oxford University Press.
