= Shahpura, Jangaon district =

Quilashapur
- Village
- Location in Telangana, India Quilashapur (India)
- Coordinates: 17.795°N 79.226°E
- Country: India
- State: Telangana
- District: Jangaon district

Languages
  - Official: Telugu
- Time zone: UTC+5:30 (IST)

Shahpura (also known as Shahpur) is a village in Jangaon district, Telangana, India. A hill-fort exists here which was occupied by the highwayman and bandit Papadu between around 1701 and 1710, during the reign of the Mughal emperor Aurangzeb. The fort endured a series of four sieges before Papadu was captured and executed. A number of Sufi mystics were laid to rest in Shahpura between the fifteenth and seventeenth centuries.
