= Shaista Khan Mosque =

Mosque in Dhaka, Bangladesh

- শায়েস্তা খাঁর মসজিদ
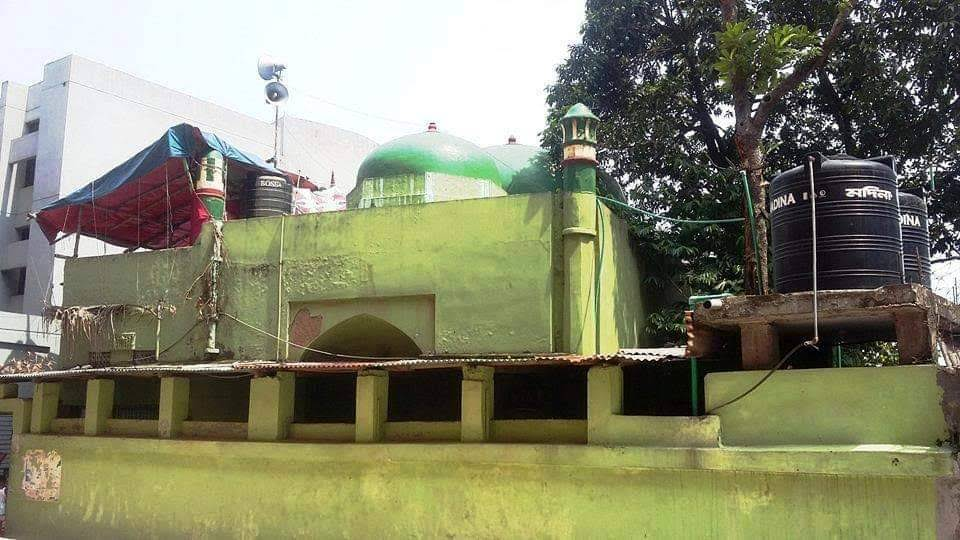
- Shaista Khan Mosque

- Location of the mosque in Dhaka

Religion
- Affiliation: Islam
- Ecclesiastical or organisational status: Mosque

Location
- Location: Mitford area, Old Dhaka, Dhaka District
- Country: Bangladesh
- Coordinates: 23°42′45″N 90°24′00″E

Architecture
- Type: Mosque architecture
- Style: Mughal
- Founder: Shaista Khan
- Groundbreaking: 1663 CE
- Completed: 1678 CE

Specifications
- Length: 14.13 m (46.4 ft)
- Width: 7.62 m (25.0 ft)
- Dome: Three
- Minaret: Four

The Shaista Khan Mosque (Bengali: শায়েস্তা খাঁর মসজিদ) is a mosque situated by the Buriganga River at Mitford Area in old Dhaka, in the Dhaka District of Bangladesh. The historically significant architectural monument was built during the Mughal era, by the Mughal Subahdar of Bengal, Shaista Khan.

== History ==
Subahdar Shaista Khan built this small mosque at the bank of river Buriganga. Shaista Khan was the Mughal subahdar who ruled the Bengal from 1664 to 1688. The exact date of the building of this mosque is not known, however it is assumed that it was built when Subahdar Shaista Khan first came to Dhaka in 1664; and built between 1663 and 1678, for the first viceroyalty of Khan. During the British period the mosque was seriously damaged by an accidental fire. Recently the mosque was repaired and lost its original look.

An inscription in Persian fixed over the doorway still stands, declaring that Shaista Khan erected the mosque. Other details including the dates are unclear.

== Architecture ==
The mosque is 14.13 by 7.62 metres (46.4 by 25.0 ft). The mosque has three domes and four octagonal minarets. The central dome is larger than the others. It has three doors in east side and one each on north and south sides. All the door are arched.

The mosque is structurally strong and it is lost among the huge structure of Mitford Hospital. Though it is ill-treated by the local people it bears a significant sign of the age of Shaista Khan. The original look of the mosque has vanished. The ornamental works of surface is now plastered and painted green.

== See also ==
- Islam in Bangladesh
- List of mosques in Bangladesh
