= Kaulas Fort =

Fort in India

- Part of Telangana
- Kowlas; Near Bichkunda in India

Location
- Location within Telangana Location within India
- Coordinates: 18.32249°N 77.69810°E

Site history
- Built: 9th century CE
- Built by: Rashtrakutas

Kaulas Fort (Kowlas Fort) is a historic fort in western Telangana in India. It was constructed by Rashtrakutas in the 9th century CE. It later came under the rule of Chalukyas of Badami, the Kakatiyas, Musunuri Nayaks, Bahmani Sultanate, Qutub Shahis, Marathas, Mughals and, finally, the Asaf Jahi rulers of the Hyderabad State. It is in the Kamareddy district, near the trijunction of Telangana, Karnataka and Maharashtra states. It has historically served as a strategic outpost contested by many kingdoms.

== History ==
The history of the fort dates back to the 9th century AD. According to historians, it was built in Indra IV’s period of the Rashtrakuta dynasty in their political capital and was later captured by the Chalukyas of the Kalyani dynasty in the third quarter of the 10th century before it was captured by the Kakatiyas in the 12th century.

The Kakatiya kingdom, which ruled from present day Warangal, held the Kowlas Fort till 1323 AD, a period more or less parallel to the one and only Kakatiya woman ruler, Rani Rudrama Devi. Later, the Kowlas region is said to have come under the rule of the Bahmanis, Qutb Shahis, Yadavas, Naikwaries, Mughals, Devagiri, Kalyani, Marathas, etc and finally under the Asaf Jahis (Nizams) (1724 to 1948).

Aurangzeb appointed two Kiladars, Khuni Khan and Ikhlas Khan who constructed two big mosques at the fort.

Nizam ul Mulk Asaf Jah appointed Raja Gopal Singh Gaur, a Kshatriya or Rajput, as the Chief of Kowlas in the 1720s. Along with Koulas, Kandhar and Mahur forts in Maharashtra were also under his control . This family resided in Kandhar. Gopal Singh's descendants ruled the kingdom of Kaulas until 1915. Raja Deep Singh played a leading role in the Sepoy Mutiny of 1857 and was sentenced to three years imprisonment by the British. The Nizam canceled his inam and restored the kingdom to his son. The last chief, Raja Durjan Singh, died prematurely and childless.

In 1915 the fiefdom was declared Khalsa (meaning directly under the rule of the Nizam). The annual revenue of the fiefdom was then 22,517 rupees.

The Nizams appointed Sahibzada Maulvi Jamaluddin Sheikh Mirza, of Turk descent, as the Kiladar of Kowlas. He was the maternal grandson of Shehzada Mirza Jamaluddin Bahadur, the Kiladar of Daulatabad Fort. His son Sahibzada Moinuddin Sheikh Mirza, was born in 1915 and chosen as his father's heir. Later, he adopted the name Moinuddin Cowlas upon migrating to Pakistan after the 1948 Annexation of Hyderabad. He remained the titular Kiladar of Kowlas until his death in 1981.

== History of the village ==
Kaulas has the ruins of an ancient fort dating back to the Kakatiya period. There are many caves on the nearby hill. Anantagiri Temple, Kalyanaramadasu Mandir and Shankaracharya Temple are famous temples in Kaunas. Kaulas original name is Kailasa Durgam. It became popular in recent times as Muslim rulers called it Kaulas. After the end of the Kakatiya Empire, the Bahmani Sultans captured Kaulas Durga. Several battles were fought between the Bahmanis and the Musunuri chieftains centered around Kaulas Durga . Hasan Gangu gave the Koulas fort to the Kapaya leader and concluded a truce.

== Village population ==
According to the 2011 India census, the village is spread over 1850 hectares with 491 houses and a population of 2186. The number of males in the village is 1178, the number of females is 1008. The number of scheduled castes is 328 while the number of scheduled tribes is 170. The census location code of the village is 571106 .Pin code: 503305.
