= Siege of Golconda =

1687 siege in India

Siege of Golconda (1687)
- Part of Mughal conquests in the Deccan
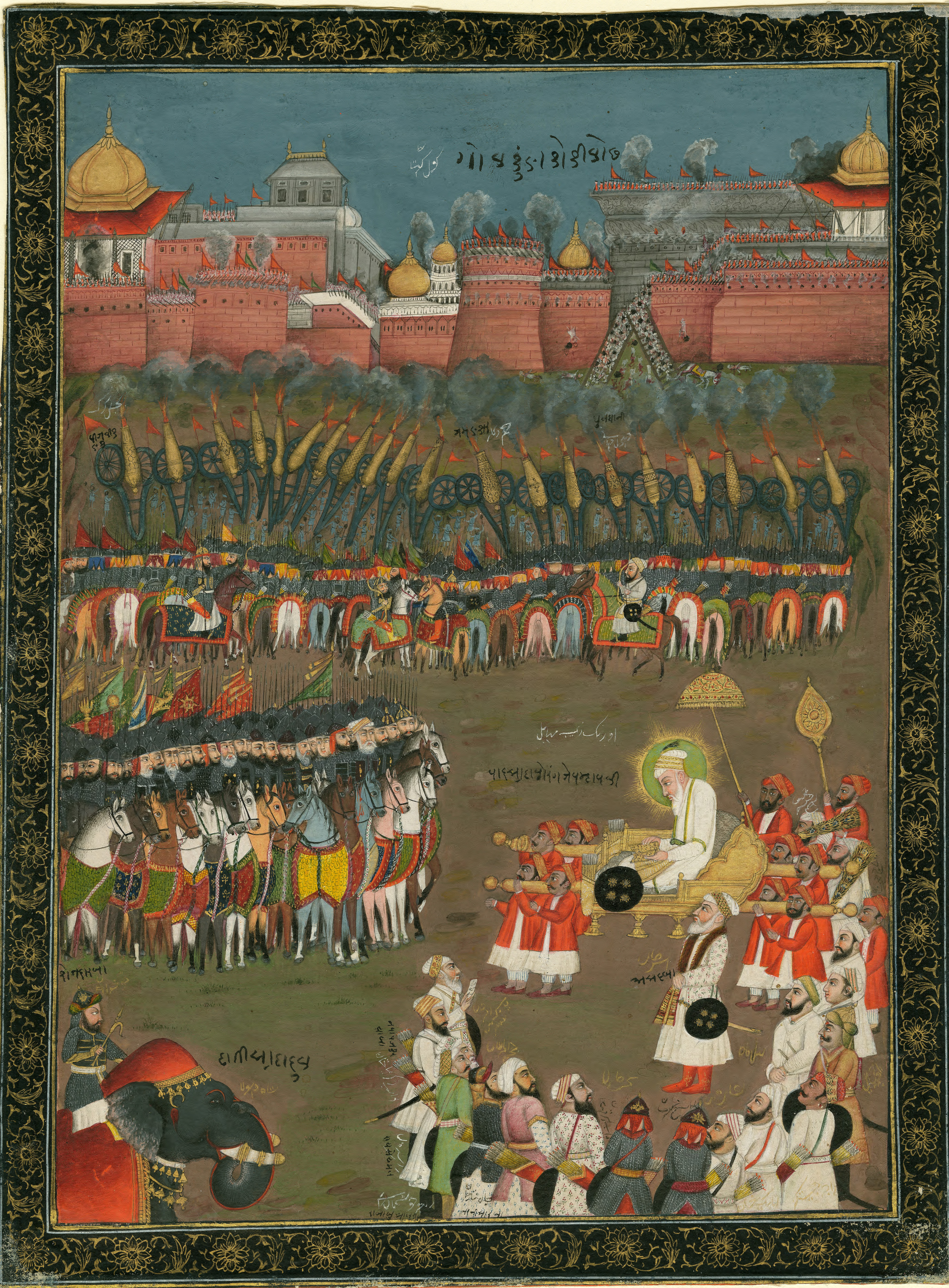
- Painting of the Mughal emperor Aurangzeb at the siege of Golconda Fort, c. 1760
| Date | 28 January – 22 September 1687 (7 months, 3 weeks and 4 days) |
| Location | Golconda |
| Result | Mughal victory |
| Territorial changes | Mughal Empire annexes Golconda Sultanate, Hyderabad Subah is formed |

Belligerents
| Mughal Empire | Golconda Sultanate (Qutb Shahi dynasty) |

Commanders and leaders
| Aurangzeb; Kilich Khan †; Feroze Jung I Saf Shikan Khan; Azam Shah; Ruhullah Khan; Anup Singh | Abul Hasan Qutb Shah; Shaikh Nizam (defector) |

Strength
| ~50,000 infantry ~50,000 cavalry ~100 siege guns | |

The siege of Golconda (1687) was an eight-month military siege of the Golconda Fort (in present-day Telangana, India). This siege was personally directed by the Mughal emperor Aurangzeb against the Golconda Sultanate, ruled by king Abul Hasan Qutb Shah. It was the second Mughal siege of the fort, following an aborted attempt by Aurangzeb in 1656 as a prince of emperor Shah Jahan. The event served as the climax of the Golconda Sultanate, which was annexed into the Mughal Empire as a result of the victory of the siege. The military confrontation was one of the final stages in the Mughal Empire's expansion southwards in the Indian subcontinent.

The siege was lengthy and laborious, hampered by the strength of the fort, environmental conditions, and dissent within the Mughal administration. The siege was won only through treachery. It exacerbated drought, famine and epidemic in the region.

== Background ==
During the reign of the fifth Mughal emperor Shah Jahan, the Mughals had managed to stabilise the empire's southern frontier in the Deccan region. The Ahmadnagar Sultanate was extinguished around 1633, and Shah Jahan negotiated tributary relationships with the last two independent polities of the Deccan, the Bijapur and Golconda Sultanates, by 1636. As a prince and commander of Shah Jahan, Aurangzeb was an advocate of annexing these remaining sultanates outright, and to this end besieged Golconda in 1656; the siege was withdrawn and a peace treaty established by Shah Jahan with Golconda's ruler, Abdullah Qutb Shah. This prompted the latter to extend the citadel's fortifications (the extended portion is today known as Naya Qila).

Abdullah Qutb Shah was succeeded by Abul Hasan Qutb Shah in 1672. In 1682, Aurangzeb (now crowned Mughal emperor) moved his camp to the Deccan to counter the rebellion of his son, prince Muhammad Akbar. After the danger was neutralised, Aurangzeb set out to fulfill his ambition of annexing the Deccan Sultanates, and successfully besieged Bijapur in 1685–1686. Golconda was a nucleus of power and wealth in the Deccan region, with control over important agricultural tracts, diamond mines, and trade routes; such factors may have influenced Aurangzeb's continued determination to conquer the Sultanate. The Maasir-i-Alamgiri, a contemporary chronicle of Aurangzeb's reign, provides other accusations against the ruler Abul Hasan, including the Sultanate's Shi'i faith, its support of Hindu practices, and support of Maratha depredations in Mughal territory.

== Prelude ==
During the siege of Bijapur in 1685, Aurangzeb intercepted a message from Abul Hasan, stating his intention to send a large armed force to combat the Mughals alongside a Maratha force. Outraged, Aurangzeb deputed his son, prince Muazzam, against the Qutb Shahi city of Hyderabad. Shah Alam's army defeated a Qutb Shahi force at Malkhed, a border town of the Sultanate, and Golconda's commander-in-chief consequently defected to the Mughal side with this followers, weakening the kingdom's defences. The Mughal army led by Shah Alam entered Hyderabad with no significant resistance, freely plundering the royal palaces. The Sultan fled, barricading himself in the Golconda Fort. Muazzam preferred a negotiated settlement with the Sultan over direct conquest; this was viewed by Aurangzeb as treason, causing him to temporarily bar Muazzam from the imperial court. Ultimately Aurangzeb reached a similar conclusion and offered terms to the Sultan to withdraw the Mughal army, similar to what Muazzam had envisioned. These terms were: the ceding of some disputed territories to the Mughals; grant of a large lump sum; and the dismissal of Madanna and Akkanna, the Brahmin ministers of the kingdom. The Sultan agreed, and Muazzam withdrew to the kingdom's border with the imperial army. However, over the next few months, the Sultan made no move to dismiss the ministers. The pressure on the kingdom led to its nobles organising an assassination of Madanna and Akkanna in March 1686, as well as other members of the fort's Hindu quarter, in an effort to appease Aurangzeb's demands. Nonetheless, on 14 January 1687, Aurangzeb set out towards Golconda with the intention of annexing it, having concluded the siege of Bijapur.

In October 1685, the northern Coromandel region began to show signs of crop failure due to a lack of monsoon, which accelerated into famine, drought, and epidemic outbreaks across the entire Coromandel by 1687. This made food security low when the Mughal army besieged Golconda.

== Siege ==
=== Preparations ===
Aurangzeb's general Ghaziuddin Khan Firuz Jang, commander-in-chief, went ahead of the emperor's advance on Golconda. He captured a fort on the kingdom's frontier, then entered and occupied Hyderabad unopposed, the Sultan having fled to Golconda Fort with the remnants of Golconda's armed forces. The fort was situated atop a hill, two kos west of the city of Hyderabad. It was four miles in circumference and surrounded by a moat. It was also stocked with a vast amount of food and ammunition, and contained fields for planting crops. Aurangzeb brought to bear 50,000 infantry, a likely equal number of cavalry, and around 100 siege guns. One such siege gun was the Azhdaha-Paikar (Persian: اژدها پيكر, lit. 'Dragon-shaped'), an iron-bronze cannon manufactured in 1647 and capable of firing 33.5 kg. This was a copy of another Mughal siege gun, the Fateh Rahbar (Persian: فاتح رهبر, lit. 'Guide to Victory'), also brought by Aurangzeb to Golconda for use in the siege. The Mughal army encamped at Fateh Maidan, an open area outside the walled city of Hyderabad serving as a command center for the siege, situated around 1.25 miles away from the fort.

=== Investment ===
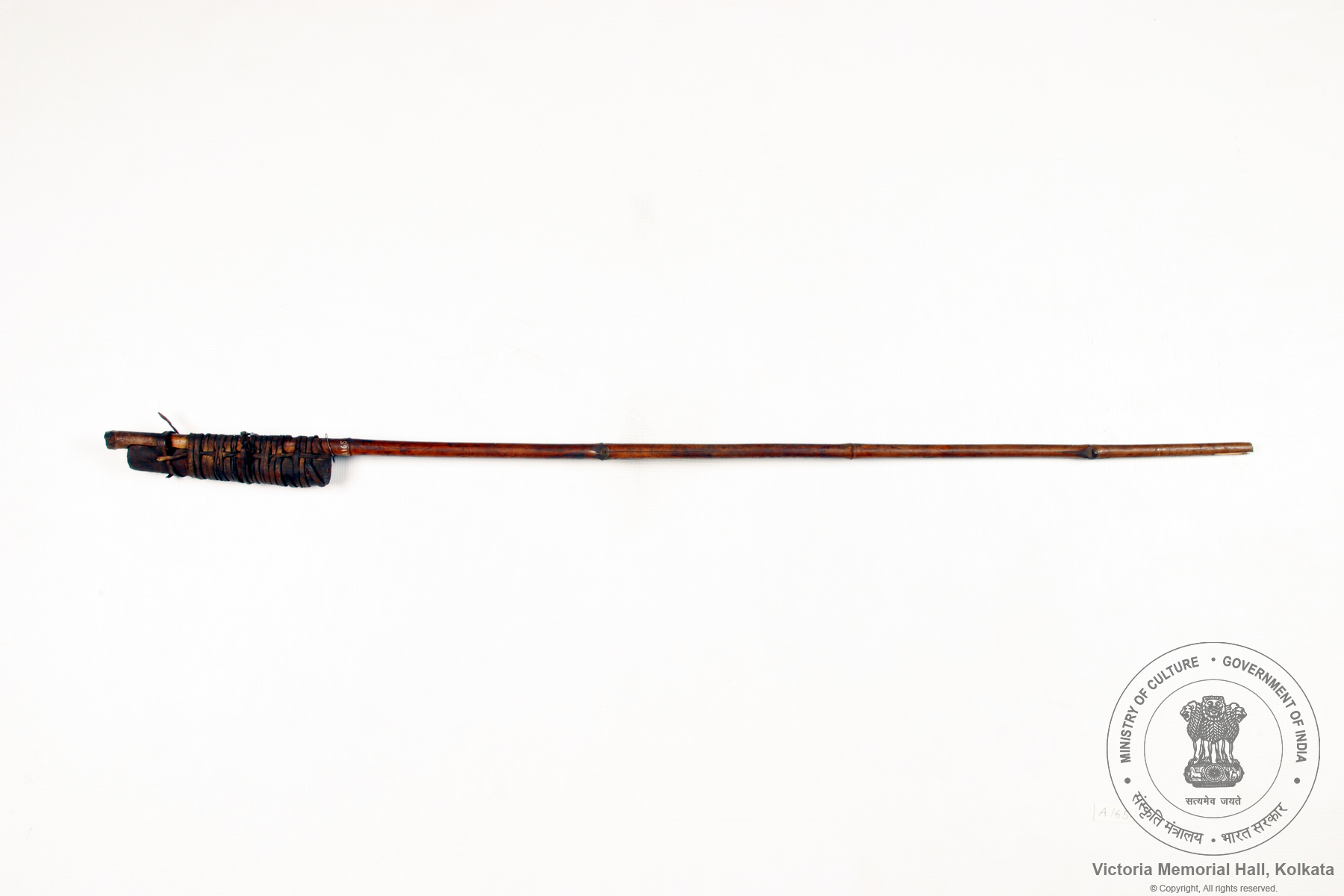
A ban (rocket) stored in the Golconda Fort, thought to have been made and charged for use against the Mughal siege of Golconda. Held in the Victoria Memorial, Kolkata.

Mughal siege operations began against the fort on the 28th of January. The full circumference of the fort was invested by the Mughal army by the end of January, with the circle divided under the command of various generals. Mughal official Qilich Khan, father of Ghaziuddin Khan, led an armed force to assault the fort head-on, but was turned back by zamburak fire from the fort's garrison. He sustained heavy injuries, with his right shoulder shattered by a cannonball, and died three days later. On the 7th of February, work began to dig trenches up to the edge of the fort's moat, and erect gun platforms that reached the height of the fort's walls; this progressed slowly due to continual gunfire and rocket fire from the fort's garrison. Soon after, Shaikh Nizam, the leading military commander of the Golconda forces outside of the walls of the fort, led a force of 40,000 cavalry on a relief expedition against the Mughals. This was routed by the Mughal imperial army, with the Golconda forces sustaining heavy losses. This represented an early success for the Mughal position, occurring within the first two weeks of the siege, and discouraged further attempts to disrupt the Mughal siege line, making this the only significant attempt to relieve the fort's garrison. Later in May 1687, Shaikh Nizam defected to the Mughal side, and was subsequently titled Muqarrab Khan.

=== Siege difficulties and Mughal dissent ===
As progress on the trenches continued, Aurangzeb faced discontent with his siege policy from members of the Mughal administration. Ghaziuddin Khan was able to uncover a significant conspiracy undertaken by the prince Muazzam, in which other members of the imperial family were involved, such as the prince's chief wife, his father-in-law, and several of his sons. Shah Alam had been covertly negotiating terms with Abul Hasan for a peaceful settlement, as had been his policy in the last Mughal invasion of Hyderabad, and had offered to act as the king's intermediary with emperor Aurangzeb. He had also been thwarting the Mughal siege by sharing the army's tactics with the king, and smuggling food into the fort. On the 21st of February, Aurangzeb placed him under house arrest, only to be released in 1695; several members of his son's family were sent away from the Deccan, and some of his followers were executed; his princely household was dispersed. Aurangzeb also faced disagreement from the imperial sadr (chief of justice and religious affairs) Qazi Abdullah, who objected to the killing of Muslims to the end of extinguishing the only other Muslim polity in the subcontinent.

In early June, progress on the trenches was still under way. Effective command was hindered by rivalries between generals; the commander Saf Shikan Khan, appointed mir atish (chief of artillery), eventually resigned in order to spite the commander-in-chief Ghaziuddin Khan, causing progress on the trenches to stall as the post passed to less capable generals. By this time the Mughal army had run out of food owing to famine in the Golconda kingdom the year prior, and the fact that the planting of crops in Hyderabad had ceased with the Mughal invasion. The monsoon season was also well under way, and heavy rains caused the area to flood; the Maasir-i-Alamgiri notes that the Manjira River overflowed. Epidemic broke out among combatants, exacerbated by airborne disease from corpses. Such conditions affected the Mughal army's morale, but Aurangzeb pressed on. Mughal cannons were ineffective against the thick walls of the Golconda citadel, but the besiegers had tunnelled three mines under the fort walls, each containing 37000 pounds of gunpowder. At dawn of June 20, Aurangzeb ordered the detonation of the first of three mines; however, the fort's garrison had already discovered two of these and countermined them. The first mine backfired, killing over 1000 Mughal soldiers. The second mine was subsequently detonated with similar results, killing many of the Mughal attackers. The third mine was detonated the next day, but failed to even ignite. Meanwhile, the fort's garrison attacked the Mughal besiegers with huqqa (hand grenades).

=== Capitulation ===
Subsequent to these failures, Aurangzeb ordered the construction of mud and wood walls enclosing the circumference of Golconda fort, sealing it off completely. On the fifth of July, he also made an official proclamation of Golconda's annexation into a province of the Mughal territories, giving it the imperial epithet Dar-ul-Jihad (lit. 'Land of War'). With the Mughal army's morale at a low point, reinforcements arrived under prince Azam and the paymaster-general Ruhullah Khan on the tenth of July, but these only exacerbated the dearth of food. Azam was made commander-in-chief in place of Ghaziuddin Khan, who had been wounded in a failed assault. Over the next few months, Aurangzeb bided his time; with the fort's occupants being cut off from supplies and the outside world, the fort's capitulation was becoming a certainty. On 21 September 1687, a Golconda noble named Sarandaz Khan betrayed the Sultanate and provided the Mughal forces access to a backdoor entrance of the fort for a night attack; a party led by Ruhullah Khan invaded the fort, and the main gate was opened, concluding the siege at eight months. Triumphant Mughal forces led by prince Azam entered through the fort's gate, subsequently dubbed the Fateh gate by Aurangzeb.

== Aftermath ==
=== Political transition ===
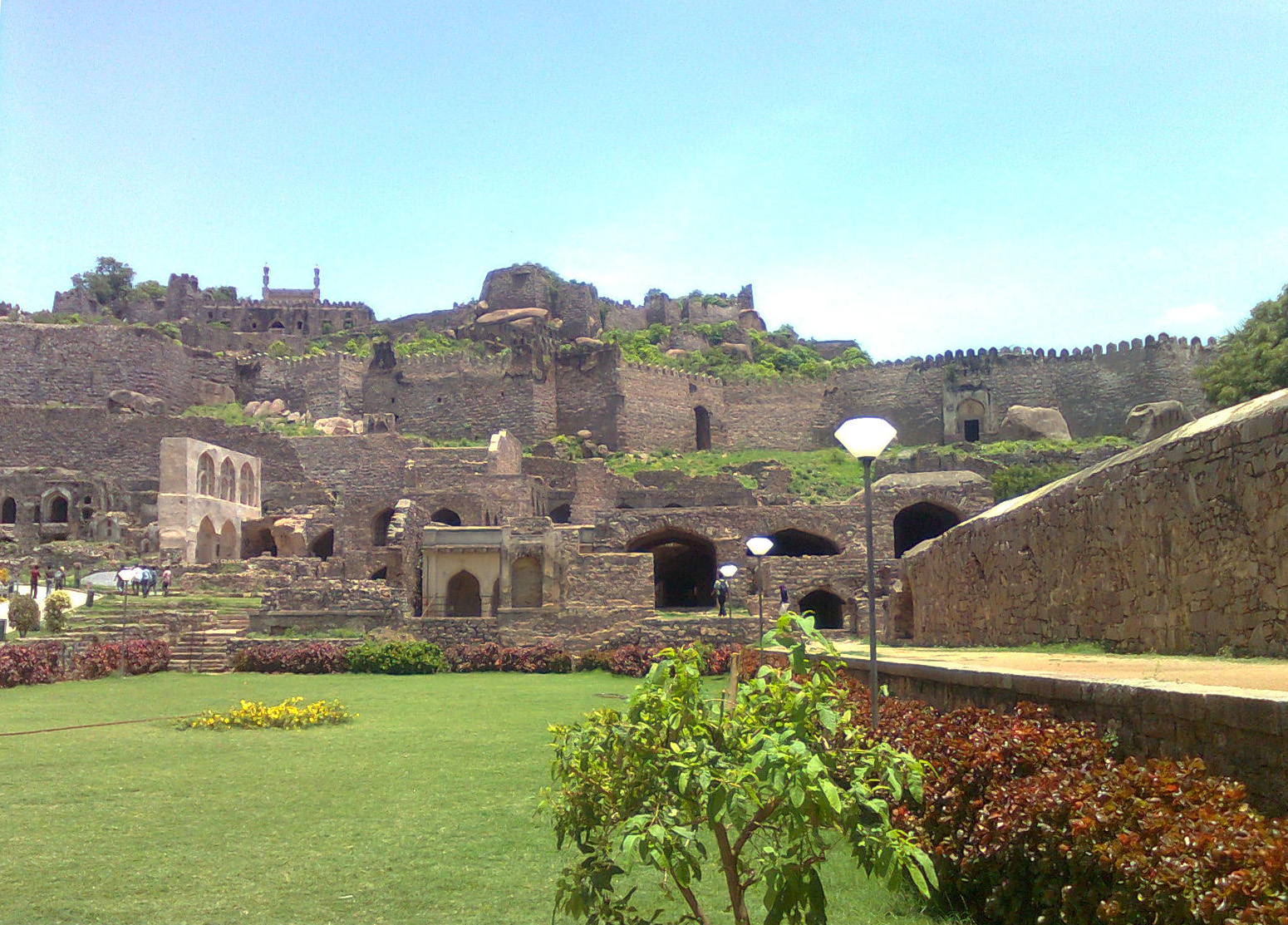
Modern-day ruins of the Golconda Fort, the site of the conflict

Following the fort's capture, the Sultan Abul Hasan Qutb Shah was arrested and sent to the Mughal imperial camp. He was subsequently imprisoned in the Daulatabad Fort; Abul Hasan would die three years later. Following the successful siege, Aurangzeb held a celebratory audience in Golconda's captured citadel, where gifts and robes of honour were bestowed on prince Azam Shah, his son Bidar Bakht, and thirty-one nobles who had held command in the siege. Some of these nobles were former officials of Golconda who had defected to the Mughal side before or during the siege, such as Muhammad Ibrahim (newly entitled Mahabat Khan), who was awarded the highest possible rank for a Mughal noble and made governor of Mughal Hyderabad. The Rajput ruler Anup Singh, who participated in the final Mughal charge against Golconda, was granted the title Maharaja by Aurangzeb. Aurangzeb also granted him the royal honour of Mahi Maratib, and raised his mansabdar rank to 3500. Riches valued over sixty million rupees were seized from the Golconda Fort's treasury, and transported towards the Mughal capitals in the north via camels. The former Golconda Sultanate, now the Mughal province Hyderabad Subah, had an administrative overhaul in the four months after the siege, as the emperor Aurangzeb made arrangements to reinstate order and transition the regional government to the Mughal imperial system. The Mughal siege had caused acute food shortages and general depletion of resources in the former kingdom, and rebuilding the economy was a major task for the new administration.

=== Golconda Fort ===
The Mughal siege greatly damaged the Golconda Fort. The fort's palace complex, in the eastern flank, may have been burnt down following the Mughal occupation of the fort. Richards notes that after its conquest, the Mughals had a very lenient attitude towards the fort; its inhabitants were spared and destruction of property was minimal. Aurangzeb's general policy after the conquest of Golconda was to staff and maintain the forts of the former kingdom instead of demolishing them. The Mughals installed some of the bimetallic cannons brought for the siege in the Golconda Fort, replacing some of its iron guns; these included the Azhdaha-Paikar, the Fateh Rahbar (both used in the siege), the Qila Kusha (lit. 'Fort Opener'), and the Atish Bar (Persian: آتش بار, lit. 'Raining Fire'). These cannons are still present at the Golconda Fort. In 1695 (during Aurangzeb's reign) a sum of 80,000 rupees was spent by the Mughal provincial administration to repair and reinforce the fort's walls.

== Legacy ==
Aurangzeb's conquest of Golconda was a major success of his reign, expanding the Mughal Empire to its southernmost point and making it the sole Islamic polity of the Indian subcontinent. It was the culmination of Mughal expansion into the Deccan that had started in emperor Akbar's time, and fulfilled Aurangzeb's forty-year ambition. However, the land and wealth gained from the siege of Golconda may not have offset the administrative and financial burden it had placed on the empire. A dominant strain of thought in Mughal scholarship asserts that the conquest of Golconda contributed to a crisis in jagirs (land grants), wherein the incentives offered by the empire in enticing and hiring officers from enemy lines, exceeded the amount of revenue yielded from the annexed lands, meaning that the supply of jagirs in the empire could not meet its demand. This caused discontent among the empire's jagirdars (feudal lords). While the policy of enticing the enemy into surrender had been the precedent in Mughal history over outright conquest, Aurangzeb's Deccan conquests may have demanded an unprecedented amount of resources to do so. The jagirdari crisis is considered a key factor in the empire's quick decline after Auranzgeb's death. The conquest of Golconda (and Bijapur) did not stabilize the Mughal position in the Deccan like Aurangzeb may have expected. Aurangzeb would never return to the Mughal capital city of Delhi in the north, but would continue to fight the Maratha threat in the Deccan until his death. The Mughal hold over Golconda's territories would last until the mid-18th century, after which Hyderabad Subah would become independently administered by the Nizam of Hyderabad.

== Bibliography ==
- Balasubramaniam, R (2005). "FATH RAIHBAR - THE MASSIVE BRONZE CANNON AT PETLA BURJ OF GOLCONDA FORT" (PDF). Indian Journal of History of Science. 40 (3).
- Bilgrami, Syed Ali Asgar (1992), Landmarks of the Deccan, Asian Educational Services, ISBN 8120605438
- Chaudhuri, Archisman (2022), "The El Nino of 1685–1687 in Golconda and Northern Coromandel, South Asia: Drought, Famine, and Mughal Wars", in Gooding, Philip (ed.), Droughts, Floods, and Global Climatic Anomalies in the Indian Ocean World, Cham: Springer International Publishing, pp. 97–125, doi:10.1007/978-3-030-98198-3_4, ISBN 978-3-030-98198-3
- Faruqui, Munis D (2012), Princes of the Mughal Empire, 1504-1719, Cambridge: Cambridge University Press, ISBN 978-1-139-52619-7, OCLC 808366461
- Hooja, Rima (2009), A History of Rajasthan (2nd ed.), Rupa
- Khalidi, Omar (2009), A Guide to Architecture in Hyderabad, Deccan, India, Aga Khan Program for Islamic Architecture & MIT Libraries
- Kugle, Scott (2016-05-02), When Sun Meets Moon: Gender, Eros, and Ecstasy in Urdu Poetry, UNC Press Books, ISBN 978-1-4696-2678-9
- Lal, Muni (1923), Aurangzeb, Vikas Publishing House
- Leonard, Karen (1971). "The Hyderabad Political System and its Participants". The Journal of Asian Studies. 30 (3). doi:10.2307/2052461. ISSN 1752-0401. JSTOR 2052461.
- Michell, George; Morelle, Nicolas (2020), Architecture militaire du Deccan: une réponse défensive face à la guerre moderne = Deccan military architecture: a response to early modern warfare, Oxford: Archaeopress, ISBN 978-1-78969-745-2
- Michell, George; Zebrowski, Mark (1999), Architecture and art of the Deccan sultanates, Cambridge: Cambridge University Press, ISBN 978-0-511-46884-1, OCLC 268771115
- Richards, John F (1970), Mughal Rule in Golconda, 1687-1724, University of California, Berkeley
- Richards, John F (1975). "The Hyderabad Karnatik, 1687-1707". Modern Asian Studies. 9 (2): 241–260. doi:10.1017/S0026749X00004996. ISSN 0026-749X. JSTOR 311962. S2CID 142989123.
- Richards, John F. (1975a), Mughal Administration in Golconda, Oxford [England]: Clarendon Press, ISBN 0-19-821561-4, OCLC 2932290
- Richards, John F (2010), "The Mughal empire", in Gordon, Johnson (ed.), The new Cambridge history of India, vol. 1, Cambridge: Cambridge University Press, ISBN 978-0-521-56603-2
- Roy, Kaushik (2011-03-30), War, Culture and Society in Early Modern South Asia, 1740-1849, Taylor & Francis, ISBN 978-1-136-79087-4
- Sarkar, Jadunath (1930), History of Aurangzib, vol. 4 (2nd ed.), Orient Longman
- Seshan, Radhika (2012), Trade and Politics on the Coromandel Coast: Seventeenth and Early Eighteenth Centuries, Primus Books, ISBN 978-93-80607-25-2
- Steingass, Francis Joseph (1892), A Comprehensive Persian-English dictionary, including the Arabic words and phrases to be met with in Persian literature, London: Routledge & K. Paul
- Streusand, Douglas E (2011), Islamic gunpowder empires: Ottomans, Safavids, and Mughals, Boulder, Colo: Westview Press, ISBN 978-0-8133-1359-7
- Tracy, James D (2000-09-25), City Walls: The Urban Enceinte in Global Perspective, Cambridge University Press, ISBN 978-0-521-65221-6
- UNESCO (2010), "The Qutb Shahi Monuments of Hyderabad Golconda Fort, Qutb Shahi Tombs, Charminar", World Heritage Convention Tentative Lists, UNESCO
