= Qazi Ghulam Mustafa =

18th-century Mughal Indian nobleman and scholar

- Reign: 17th – 18th century
- Successor: 'Khan Zaman Khan Bahadur' Ali Asghar
- Full name: Nawab Kartalab Khan Qazi Ghulam Mustafa
- Born: Ferozepur Jhirka
- Died: AH 1123 (AD 1711); Ferozepur Jhirka
- Buried: Ferozepur Jhirka
- Noble family: Qadi
- Spouse: Bibi Rasti (died Dhu al-Qi'dah 1147 AH / 1734 AD) daughter of Qazi Syed Rafi Mohammad.
- Issue: Khan Zaman Khan Bahadur Ali Asghar
- Father: Diwan Shaikh Asaf

Qazi Ghulam Mustafa (died c. 1123 AH / 1711 AD) was one of the prominent noblemen during the Mughal Empire. He was entitled 'Kartalab Khan' by Bahadur Shah I. He was Emir and belonged to Ferozepur Jhirka.

== Biography ==
Qazi Ghulam Mustafa (died ca 1123 AH / 1711 AD) was one of the prominent noble men during the Mughal Empire.

== Awards and honour ==
He was entitled 'Nawab Kartalab Khan' meaning "the seeker of challenges" in Persian by Bahadur Shah I

Bahadur Shah I also named as Shah Alam in his first Juloos (Parade) on 24 Jumada al-awwal appointed him as 'Karoregiri' of the royal treasure with an award of Khalat

Bahadur Shah I in his second Juloos on 9 Dhu al-Qi'dah awarded him Mansab Do Hazari (2,000), zaat wa sowar. In the same year on 15 Dhu al-Qi'dah, the king awarded him the responsibility of 'Amanat'. He was also awarded 3,000 + 5,00 zaat wa sowar

== Death ==
He died on 20 Muharram 1129 AH/1716 and buried in Ferozepur Jhirka. In another book, his date of death is mentioned as last days of dhul Hijjah 1122 AH / 1710 AD. However, an epitaph from Ferozepur Jhirka, places the death of Kartalab Khan Bahadur, son of Shaikh Muhammad Asaf in AH 1123 (AD 1711)

== Family history ==
The family of Qazi Ghulam Mustafa came to India from Medina. His forefathers, Haji al Harmen Malik Hussain belonged to the family Ansar of Medina Munawwarah, was a prominent man and came to India with his son Bandagi Shaikh Khalil. They stayed in Delhi at Masjid Mahal. Both father and son were very distinguished scholars of many disciplines. Three sons were born to Bandagi Shaikh Khalil in Delhi. The elder son was Akhwand Mir, second was Mohammad Ammad and third youngest was Mohammad Zakaria. These three brothers were closely attached and 'Ba’it' by Qazi Shariah. These three brothers along with Qazi Shariah went to Mewat and settled there at Jhumrawat. In Jhumrawat near the mountain, they are buried near the grave of Qazi Shariah.

Family of Akhwand Mir and Mohammad Ammad

The grandson of Akhwand Mir was Abdus Samad ibn Mohammad Nizam. Abdus Samad had two sons; elder was Bandagi Makhdoom Tahir who along with his Uncle Abu Mohammad son of Mohammad Ammad was settled in Ferozepur Jhirka and made it a big estate (riyasat). The other son of Abdus Samad, Mohammad Zain was later on settled in Sakras (Haryana).

Dewan Shaikh Asaf and his father Dewan Maskeen raised both name and fame. They were chief revenue officers of a province Mewat and were entitled Dewan by Mughals. Dewan Maskeen was the son of Imamuddin ibn Sadr Jahan ibn Adul Malik ibn Abu Mohammad ibn Mohammad Ammad ibn Bandagi Shaikh Khalil. Dewan Shaikh Asaf (also Idris) was married to Bibi Rabiya, daughter of Noor Munawwar Narkhi (ibn Mohammad Talib Narkhi ibn Ainuddin ibn Moinuddin ibn Qazi Fatehullah).

Qazi Ghulam Mustafa and Ghulam Husain were two prominent sons of Dewan Shaikh Asaf and Bibi Rabiya. The son of Ghulam Husain, Ali Akbar was also entitled Khan, while the daughter, Sharfun Nisan was married to Syed Yusuf Ali Khan from 'Syed Sarai' of Rewari.

Family of Mohammad Zakaria

The son of Mohammad Zakaria was Pir Mohammad Najeeb was settled in Bahadurpur (Haryana). He was very famous religious sajjada. Shah Mohammad Hanif from Bahadurpur belonged to his descendant.

== Marriage and children ==
Qazi Ghulam Mustafa was married to Bibi Rasti (died Dhu al-Qi'dah 1147 AH / 1734 AD) daughter of Qazi Syed Rafi Mohammad.

Khan Zaman Khan Ali Asghar was his son. Nawab Khan Zaman Khan Bahadur Ghalib Jung 'Ali Asghar' was Mansabdar Punj Hazari (5,000) Emir and was posted first Khidmat Daroghgi Topkhana, a store of Armory (military) at Multan; Faujdar at Moazamabad; Naib Subahdar at Azimabad (Patna); and then Subahdar at Awadh during the reign from Farrukhsiyar to Muhammad Shah. The fort at Ferozepur Jhirka was built by him. He died in Shahjahanbad (Delhi) on 4 Zil Haj 1155 AH/30 January 1743. Fatima, the daughter of Qazi Ghulam Mustafa, was married to Abul Fazal, son of Ataullah ibn Noor Munawwar Narkhi.

One of the daughters of Qazi Syed Rafi Mohammad was married to Qazi Ghulam Mustafa, and another daughter Sahib Daulat was married to Islam Khan V.

== See also ==
- Qazi Syed Rafi Mohammad
- Ferozepur Jhirka
