= Syed Rafi Mohammad =

Indian scholar

Qazi Syed Rafi Mohammad
- Died: 1679
- Known for: Qazi and Scholar
- Spouse(s): Latifun Nisan and Kafia
- Partner: Syed Shamsuddin Sani (alias Syed Chajju Jagat Jaut
- Children: Mohammad Baqar, Qazi Syed Inayatullah, Mohammad Asadullah, Mohammad Atiqullah, Mohammad Rizqullah, Bibi Rasti, Mir Imamudin, Mir Amanullah, Sahib Daulat and Mah Bibi
- Relatives: Mir Imaduddin ibn Syed Shamsuddin (Grand father)

Qāḍī Sayyid Rāfiʿ Muḥammad Dasondhi (Urdu: قاضي سيد رافع محمد; died ca 1090 AH/1679 AD) was a scholar of repute from Sakras, District Gurgaon (now in Nuh district, Haryana). He belonged to the family of Gardēzī Sadaat.

== Biography ==
Qazi Syed Rafi Mohammad (alias Qazi Dasondhi) was a scholar of repute from Sakras, District Gurgaon (Haryana). He belonged to the family of Gardēzī Sadaat. His copies of many judgments as Islamic lawyer were preserved in the library of Hakim Syed Karam Husain at Tijara, Alwar.

== Family history ==
After the massacre by Genghis Khan's forces in Iran (Destruction under the Mongol Empire), his ancestors migrated from Mashhad (Iran) to Sabzwar and then to India via Gardēz (Afghanistan) during the reign of Sultan Shams-ud-din Iltutmish (1211–1235). In India, this family was acclaimed later on as Gardēzī Sadaat and received many honorific titles from Mughal emperors.

According to Akhbarul Akhyar by Shaikh Abdul-Haqq Dehlavi, the two brothers Mir Syed Shahabuddin and Mir Syed Shamsuddin Daod who belonged to Gardezi Sadaat came to Delhi during Iltutmish's reign. The family of Mir Syed Shahabuddin was settled in Manikpur while the family of Mir Syed Shamsuddin Daod stayed in the region of Mewat. From the family of Manikpur, Raji Hamid Shah (caliph Shaikh Hisamuddin Manikpuri) was a famous scholar. The lineal descendant of both these brothers in Mewat and Manikpur are remembered as Gardezi Sadaat. According to Tarikhul Aimma fi Zikr Khulafai Ummah by Mir Mahboob Ali, "some family members of Syed Shamsuddin Daod were settled in Sabzwar, and hence also known as Syed Sabzwari".

In relation to Gardez, Sultan Iltumish knew the family of Mir Syed Shamsuddin very well especially his father Mir Zainuddin from Gardez. The Sultan allowed his sister to marry Mir Syed Shamsuddin. After the demise of his sister, his daughter got married with Mir Syed Shamsuddin. In this way, Mir Syed Shamsuddin enjoyed the royal courtship and remained with Sultan Iltumish. He had two sons Mir Imaduddin and Mir Azizuddin. Mir Syed Shamsuddin died either during the reign of either Nasiruddin Mahmud or Ghiyas ud din Balban. Because of close association with Sultan Iltumish, his family members were sent to jail during the reign of Jalal ud din Firuz Khalji and then Alauddin Khalji. When Alauddin Khalji killed his uncle Jalaluddin Khalji in 1295 AD/ 695 AH, many prisoners escaped from the jails and many were killed. In this mayhem and confusion, Mir Imaduddin with his nephew Burhanuddin fled Delhi to Ranthambore with Muhammad Shah, a rebel general of Sultan Alauddin Khalji in 1299 AD. At that time, Hammir Dev Chauhan was the king of Ranthambore Fort. During the attack of Alauddin Khalji in 701AH/1301AD, both Mir Imaduddin and Burhanuddin were martyred and buried near the gate of Ranthambore Fort.

After Mir Imaduddin’s martyrdom, his family members including his son Syed Shamsuddin Sani (alias Syed Chajju Jagat Jaut) remained in Ranthambore for a few more decades. According to Tarikh-i-Firuz Shahi by Ziauddin Barani, the families that belonged in the period of Sultan Iltutmish and remained in the period of Ghiyas ud din Balban were also from ancestors of Syed Chajju.

The name of Syed Chajju Gardezi is found in many books and journals. It is said that the Islamic mystic saints played a very important part towards the evolution of a common language, known as Hindustani. We get genuine specimens and authentic evidence of the linguistic assimilation in the religious literature of medieval India. This is evident in Indian names like ...Syed Chajju Gardezi.

The history during and after Syed Chajju Gardezi alias Chajju Jagat Jaut is not very distinguishable and traceable. According to Hakim Syed Karam Husain, the family of Syed Chajju were later on bestowed with vast lands by many kings near the areas of Mewat in return for their great services. Apart from Sakras (Mewat), some members of Mir Imaduddin and Mir Burhanuddin were also settled in Gujarat and Deccan. From the Gujarat family, Qazi Mahmood (846 AH / 1442 AD – 925 AH / 1519 AD) got a reputation as scholar about whom Abdul-Haqq Dehlavi (d.1642 c.e.) mentioned in his manuscript as a great 'Sufi Shaikh' of Gujarat. Qazi Mahmood lived a good life during the Sultanate period of Gujarat at Ahmedabad at the times of Sultan Shams-ud Din Muzaffar Shah II (son of Sultan Nasir-ud-Din Mahmud Shah I). From Ahmedabad, he shifted to his native place 'Sarpore' (Gujarat) in 920 AH / 1514 AD where he lived till death.

Qazi Syed Rafi Mohammad (alias Qazi Dasondhi) was the great great grandson of Syed Shamsuddin Sani (alias Syed Chajju Jagat Jaut).

== Marriages, children and in-laws ==
Qazi Syed Rafi Mohammad was married to Latifun Nisan, the elder daughter of Husain Mohammad ibn Mohammad Jamal. With Latifun Nisan, he had five sons – Mohammad Baqar, Qazi Syed Inayatullah, Mohammad Asadullah, Mohammad Atiqullah Shaheed, Mohammad Rizqullah Shaheed and one daughter Bibi Rasti.

Mohammad Baqar was married to Sultan Bibi from Palwal, while Mohammad Asadullah was married to the daughter of Fatehullah of Sakras (Haryana), Mohammad Atiqullah was married to Mehtab Bibi, daughter of Mohammad Khaliq ibn Mohammd Qaim ibn Fateh Mohammad ibn Mohammad Adam. Mohammad Atiqullah and Mohammad Rizqullah got martyrdom (Shaheed) during Sipâhigiri.

Bibi Rasti (died Dhu al-Qi'dah 1147 AH / 1734 AD) was married to Qazi Ghulam Mustafa, who was honoured with the title of 'Nawab Kar Talab Khan' By Bahadur Shah I. Nawab Kar Talab Khan was a noble and Emir during the reign of Shah Alam. Shah Alam also honoured him various awards and Khalat including Mansab Do Hazari (2,000), zaat wa sowar. He died on 2 Muharram 1129 AH/1716 and buried in Ferozepur Jhirka. An epitaph from Ferozepur Jhirka, places the death of Kartalab Khan Bahadur, son of Shaikh Muhammad Asaf in AH 1123 (AD 1711).

Khan Zaman Khan Ali Asghar was the son of Bibi Rasti and 'Nawab Kar Talab Khan' Qazi Ghulam Mustafa. Nawab Khan Zaman Khan Bahadur Ghalib Jung 'Ali Asghar' was Mansabdar Punj Hazari (5,000) Emir and was posted first as Faujdar at Moazamabad; Khidmat Daroghgi Topkhana, a store of Armory (military) at Multan; Naib Subahdar at Azimabad (Patna); and then Subahdar at Awadh during the reign from Farrukhsiyar to Muhammad Shah. The fort at Ferozepur Jhirka was built by him. He died in Shahjahanbad (Delhi) on 4 Zil Haj 1155 AH/30 January 1743

After the death of Latifun Nisan, Syed Rafi Mohammad remarried to Kafia, daughter of Khan Mohammad of Palwal and sister of Husain Mohammad. From Kafia, he had two sons Mir Imamudin and Mir Amanullah and two daughters Sahib Daulat (married to Barkhurdar Khan II alias Islam Khan V and Mah Bibi (married to Noorul Haq ibn Mian Abdur Rahman of Tijara).

Barkhurdar Khan II alias Islam Khan V (died 21 Safar 1147 AH / 1734 AD) was the son of Barkhurdar Khan I and great-grandson of Islam Khan I. Barkhurdar Khan II was Mansabdar Punj Hazari (5,000) and also entitled 'Islam Khan' by Shah Alam and had Mansab 'Darogha Dīwān-e-Khās' (Superintendent of the Diwan-i-Khas) and Khalat-e Fakhra and Khalat-e Barani. He was 'Mir Atash' (the 'master gunner') to Bahadur Shah I before retirement from court, but was restored to his rank of 5,000 (3,000 horse), and appointed Mir Tuzak Awwal (chief Mir Tuzak / quarter-master general). Sahib Daulat and Barkhurdar II had two sons – elder son Ghulam Baqi aka Maddan was also entitled 'Barkhurdar Khan' (Barkhurdar III), while his younger son Ghulam Mohammad aka Saddan was killed (martyred) during the fight between the English forces and Shuja-ud-Daula in 1765.

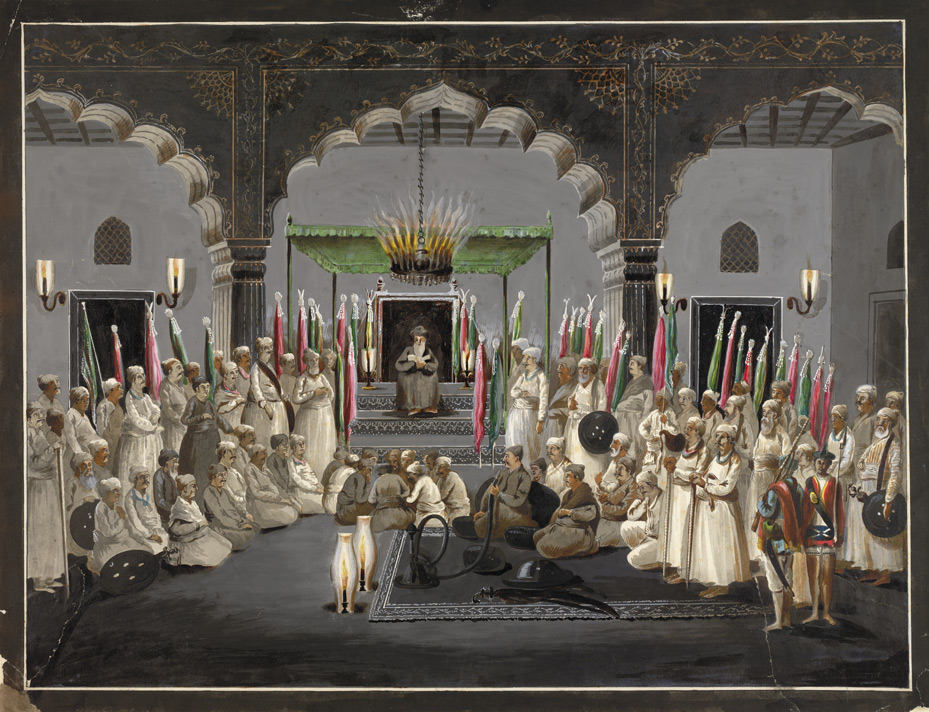
Mughal ranks included the Nawab, Subahdar, Mansabdar, Subedar and Sawar. Mughal princes were often given the title Mir and Mirza

== Legacy and descendants ==
- Mohammad Baqar had three daughters. The elder daughter Khairun Nisan was married to Mohammad Ikram son of Sultan Mohammad aka Qazi Mian of Palwal. Qazi Mian (Sultan Mohammad) was married to Al-Huda, daughter of Mohammad Arif ibn Hussain Mohammad. The second daughter of Mohammad Baqar, Khaliq Bandi was married to Mohammad Muqtada son of Qazi Ghulam Murtaza of Tijara. The third daughter, Shaista was married to Masahib Ali son of Mohammad Atiqullah. Khairun Nisan had one son Abu Ishaq and one daughter Noorun Nisan, who was married to Mohammad Mureed son of Qazi Syed Hayatullah, while Khaliq Bandi had one son, Karimuddin.
- Qazi Syed Inayatullah was married to Bibi Rasheedi, daughter of Durwesh Mohammad ibn Qazi Dost Mohammad of Pinangwan. All the grandchildren of Qazi Syed Inayatullah like forefathers lived in Sakras (Haryana) for around 500 years and were famous as Qadi family or 'Sadaat-e Sakras'. Hakim Syed Karam Husain was the direct descendant of Qazi Syed Inayatullah.
- Mohammad Asadullah had one son, Nasiruddin and three daughters Hafizah, Zarifah and Khadijah (married to Mohammad Azim, son of Mohammad Taqi ibn Abdul Hadi of Tijara). Aminuddin was the son of Nasiruddin.
- Mohammad Atiqullah had one son, Masahib Ali who was married to his cousin Shaista.
- Mohammad Rizqullah died in an adulthood while Spahigiri. He was not married.
- Mir Amanullah was married to Bibi Tajunnisan, daughter of Abdul Hai ibn Noor Munnawar Nirkhi.
- Mir Imamuddin was married to Bibi Mendu, daughter of Mohammad Shuja of Ferozepur Jhirka.

== See also ==
- Qazi Syed Inayatullah
- Hakim Syed Karam Husain
- Hakim Syed Zillur Rahman
- Syed Ziaur Rahman

== Notes ==
The father of Latifun Nisan, Husain Mohammad was the son of Mohammad Jamal ibn Mohammad Adam ibn Zainuddin ibn Moinuddin ibn Qazi Fatehullah of Tijara.

The second son of Mohammad Jamal was Mohammad Fazil, who had four sons – Farzullah, Mohammad Faiz, Fakhrullah and Umarullah. Apart from Moinuddin, Qazi Fatehullah had another son namely, Qazi Abdullah. The descendants of Qazi Abdullah were mostly “Qazi” of cities while Moinuddin family adopted the profession as technical writer of rules and regulations (Nirkh Nawesi). It is interesting that different communities had different Nirkh in similar cases. Hence the son of Moinuddin (apart from Zainuddin), Ainuddin and his grand sons – Mohammad Talib, Noor Munnawar Nirkhi, Ataullah Nirkhi were all had profession as 'Nirkh Nawesi'. The son of Ataullah Nirkhi, Abul Fazal was married to the daughter of Khan Zaman Khan Ali Asghar.
