= Khan Zaman Khan Ali Asghar =

Mughal nobleman (1673–1743)

Ali Asghar
- Reign: 18th century
- Full name: Khan Zaman Khan Bahadur Ali Asghar
- Born: 1673; Ferozepur Jhirka
- Died: 30 January 1743 (aged 69–70); Shahjahanbad
- Buried: Ferozepur Jhirka
- Noble family: Qadi
- Spouse: Shah Bibi
- Father: Qazi Ghulam Mustafa
- Mother: Bibi Rasti

Ali Asghar (1673 – 30 January 1743) was one of the prominent Emirs and noblemen during the Mughal Empire. He was entitled 'Khan Zaman Khan Bahadur' by Emperor Farrukhsiyar. He remained in many important posts during the successive rules of Bahadur Shah I, Jahandar Shah, Farrukhsiyar, Rafi ud Darajat, Shah Jahan II and Muhammad Shah.

The fort at Ferozepur Jhirka was built by him. He died in Shahjahanbad (Delhi) on 4 Dhu al-Hijjah 1155 AH/30 January 1743 at the age of 70 years.

== Biography ==
Ali Asghar was the son of Kartalab Khan Bahadur Shahi Qazi Ghulam Mustafa and Bibi Rasti, a daughter of Qazi Syed Rafi Mohammad. He was Mansabdar Punj Hazari (5,000) Emir.

His forefathers were settled in Ferozepur Jhirka for a long time and made a big estate (riyasat) in that town. His grandfather Dewan Shaikh Asaf and great grandfather Dewan Maskeen raised both name and fame. They were chief revenue officers of the province Mewat and were entitled Dewan by the Mughals.

In Shahnama Munawwar, he was mentioned as a "Mewati Ansari Khanzada" as he was the son of 'Nawab Kartalab Khan', hence 'Khanzada' and belonged to the family 'Ansar' of Medina, hence 'Ansari'. His mother was the daughter of Syed Rafi Mohammad, a Sayyid of Gurgaon, Haryana.

Nawab Khan Zaman Khan Bahadur handed over the keys of the Red Fort along with some treasures to Bahadur Shah I on 1 Rabi' al-awwal, when the emperor was staying near Delhi

Nawab Khan Zaman Khan Bahadur along with some other nobles like Muhammad Khan Bangash, Mir Musharraf and Chabila Ram Nagar came with the treasure to join prince Izzuddin (Prince Azzu-ud-Din/Izz-ud-Din Bahadur) son of Jahandar Shah

In the book, 'Muraqqa'e Dehli' or 'The Delhi Album' or 'The Delhi during Muhammad Shah', a great detail of Nawab Khan Zaman Khan Bahadur's life and works are mentioned

== Awards and honours ==
- Shah Alam I alias Bahadur Shah I in his third Juloos (royal procession / parade) on 16 Jumada al-awwal awarded Khalat-e Barani
- Shah Alam I in his third Juloos on 7 Dhu al-Qi'dah awarded him Mansab Teen Hazari (3,000) and Do Hazari Sawar (2,000)
- 'Khan Zaman Khan Bahadur' and his close relative Islam Khan V (Barkhurdar Khan II) were invited to attend the marriage ceremony of the prince of Shah Alam I
- Shah Alam I in his fourth Juloos on 22 Shawwal awarded Khalat-e Fakhra
- Shah Alam I in his fifth Juloos on 5 Safar promoted 'Khan Zaman Khan Bahadur Ghalib Jung' with additional Mansab Char Hazari (4,000) and zaat wa sowar
- On Friday 15 Dhu al-Hijjah, in the second Juloos of Emperor Farrukhsiyar, 'Khan Zaman Khan Bahadur' and his close relative Islam Khan V (Barkhurdar Khan II) attended the Friday prayer along with Emperor Farrukhsiyar
- In between 7 and 12 Ramdan at the third Juloos of Emperor Farrukhsiyar, he was appointed as Naib Subahdar at Azimabad (Patna). In the same year at the end Ramdan, he was awarded with Rs. 1 lac
- On 3 Moharram in the fourth Juloos of Farrukhsiyar, he was appointed as Naib Subahdar at Multan and was awarded with another Khalat. In the fifth Juloos of Farrukhsiyar on 27 Dhu al-Qi'dah, Aqidat Khan ibn Ameer Khan was appointed Naib Subahdar of Multan because of the transfer of 'Khan Zaman Khan Bahadur'
- 'Khan Zaman Khan Bahadur' visited the fort of Farrukhsiyar and presented 100 moharen (gold coins) and 7 horses and in return, he was awarded Khalat-e Khaas
- On 5 Safar in the 6 Juloos, he was appointed as Subahdar at Awadh and Faujdar at Moazamabad and was awarded Mansabdar Punj Hazari (5,000) and 3,000 Sawar. This appointment was made in place of Aziz Khan Chughtai. On 22 Rabi' al-awwal in the 7 Juloos, Mahabat Khan was appointed as Subahdar of Awadh in place of 'Khan Zaman Khan Bahadur' and in place of Sar Buland Khan, 'Khan Zaman Khan Bahadur' was appointed as Subahdar of Azimabad (Patna) with the award of another Khalat
- Muhammad Shah on 15 Jumada al-Thani in his 4 Juloos, appointed 'Khan Zaman Khan Bahadur' as his 'Naib Mir Atish' (the 'master gunner') with the awards of Khalat and "Sar Pech". Muhammad Shah also in his 4 Juloos on 16 Shawwal awarded him Khalate Fakhra and ‘'Sar Pech Marsah'’
- He was also appointed as 'Khidmat Daroghgi Topkhana', a store of Armory (military) at Multan

== Marriage and children ==
He was first married to the sister of Islam Khan V also the daughter of Abdul Khaliq, son of Barkhurdar Khan I. His second wife was Shah Bibi, daughter of Qazi Syed Asadullah of Rewari and maternal granddaughter of Abdul Hadi, son of Qazi Ibrahim of Tijara.

== See also ==
- Syed Rafi Mohammad
- Ferozepur Jhirka
