= Islam Khan =

Islam Khan may refer to:

- Islam Khan I - also known as Islam Khan Chisti (died 1613)
- Islam Khan II - also known as Islam Khan Mashhadi (died 1647)
- Islam Khan III - also known as Islam Khan Badakhshi (died 1663)
- Islam Khan IV - also known as Islam Khan Rumi (died 1673)
- Islam Khan V - Mir Ahmad Barkhurdar Khan (d. 1734)
- Islam Khan (umpire) (born 1953), Pakistani cricket umpire
