= Ferozepur Jhirka =

Ferozepur Jhirka Jhirka
- Town
- Interactive map of Ferozepur Jhirka
- Coordinates: 27°47′15″N 76°56′47″E
- Country: India
- State: Haryana
- District: Nuh
- Founder: Khanzada Feroz Khan

Population (2011)
  - Total: 24,750

Language
  - Official: Hindi, Haryanvi
- Time zone: UTC+5:30 (IST)
- Postal code: 122104
- ISO 3166 code: IN-HR
- Vehicle registration: HR-28
- Website: haryana.gov.in

Ferozepur Jhirka, occasionally called Jhirka, is a town and historical settlement in the Ferozepur Jhirka, a sub-division of the Nuh district in the Indian state of Haryana.

== History ==
=== Medieval era ===
Ferozepur Jhirka was founded in 1419 by Wali-e-Mewat, Khanzada Feroz Khan who was the ruler of Mewat.

=== Mughal era ===
Mohammad Hayat Khan Numberdar and his brother Burkat Ullah Khan were landlord zamidar in Ferozepur Jhirka. Abu Mohammad along with Makhdoom Tahir(from Jhumrawat) turned this into larger estate (riyasat). Qazi Ghulam Mustafa from Ferozepur Jhirka, and who was honoured By Bahadur Shah I was close relative to these two and he was married to Bibi Rasti (died Dhu al-Qi'dah 1147 AH / 1734 AD), the daughter of Qazi Syed Rafi Mohammad.

Khan Zaman Khan Ali Asghar, who built the Ferozepur Jhirka Fort was a courtier of Mughal Emperor Farrukhsiyar of Delhi. He was the son of Bibi Rasti and Nawab Kar Talab Khan Qazi Ghulam Mustafa. He was Panj Hazari Mansabdar Emir (a courtier with a military rank of officer-in-charge of 5000 horses) and was posted first as Faujdar at Moazzam Abad (Sargodha), later as Khidmat Daroghi Topkhana (incharge of armory Armory (military) store) at Multan; Naib Subahdar at Azimabad (Patna), and then Subahdar at Awadh during the reigns of Farrukhsiyar to Muhammad Shah. He died in Shahjahanbad (Delhi) on 4 Dhu al-Hijjah 1155 AH (1742 CE). Nazim khan son of Hasan Mohm Islam Khan V, who belonged to Ferozepur Jhirka, was also a close relative of Qazi Ghulam Mustafa.

This princely state was abolished by the British Raj in 1858 after the Rebellion of 1857.

=== Lesser Balochistan ===
The 1828 CE The Imperial Gazetteer of India of East India Company refers to this area as Lesser Balochistan, a likely reference to arrival of people from Balochistan during Lodhi era who might have been the rulers of Ferozepur Jhirka area from Lodhi era onward. They likely built the Taoru Tomb complex during the successive dynasties. The largests tomb belongs to a Baloch.

=== District reorganisation ===
Previously, the town of Ferozepur Jhirka was part of district Gurgaon, but through gazette notification by the Government of Haryana, on 4 April 2005 it became part of Nuh district. Since then it has been sub-division of Nuh district.

== Demographics ==
The area is dominated by Hindus. It was earlier in the Gurgaon district but was later moved to the Mewat district. Ferozepur Jhirka constituency has 80% Hindus and 20% Meo Muslims.

As of 2001 India census, Ferozepur Jhirka had a population of 17,751. Males constitute 52% of the population and females 48%. Ferozepur Jhirka has an average literacy rate of 59.5%: male literacy is 70% and female literacy is 80%. In Ferozepur Jhirka, 19% of the population is under 6 years of age.

are Dominant in Ferozepur Jhirka .

Religion in Ferozepur Jhirka City
Religion	Population (1911)	Percentage (1911)
Islam	3,050	53.33%
Hinduism	2,309	40.37%
Sikhism	3	0.05%
Christianity	1	0.02%
Others (Note: Including Jainism, Buddhism, Zoroastrianism, Judaism, others, or not stated)	356	6.22%
Total Population	5719	100%

== Villages ==
Agon, Ahmadbas Ferozepur, Ainchwari, Akhnaka, Aklimpur Ferozepur, Aklimpur Nuh, Alipur Tigra, Asaisika, Aterna Shamshabad, Badarpur, Baded, Badopur, Baghola, Bahripur, Bai Khera, Balai, Banarsi, Basai Khanzada, Basaimeo, Bazidpur, Beriabas, Bhadas, Bhakroji, Bhond, Bilakpur, Biwan, Bubalheri, Bukharaka, Chakrangala, Chandraka, Chitora, Dhadauli Khurd, Dhadola, Dhadoli Kalan, Dhana, Dhanwala, Dholi, Dhondal, Dogri, Doha, Dungeja, Dunghran Shahzadpur, Fakarpur Khori, Ferozepur Deher, Ferozepur Jhirka (MC), Gandoori, Ghaghas, Ghata Shamasabad, Ghatwasan, Gohana, Gokalpur, Gujar Nagla, Gumat Bihari, Hamzapur, Hasanpur Bilonda, Hasanpur Nuh, Hirwari Bamatheri, Huhuka, Ibrahimbas, Imam Nagar, Jaitaka, Jaitalaka, Jalalpur Ferozepur, Jalalpur Nuh, Jargali, Jharpuri, Jhimrawat, Kameda, Kansali, Karaheri, Karehra Ferozepur, Khan Mohammadpur, Khanpur Ghati, Khanpur Nuh, Kherla Kalan, Kherla Khurd, Kherli Kalan, Kherli Khurd, Kherli Nuh, Khori, Khoshpuri, Kol Gaon, Kultajpur Kalan, Lohinga Khurd, Madapur, Madhi, Maholi, Mahoon, Mahun, Malhaka, Mandikhera, Marora, Mohamadnagar, Mohammadbas, Mohlaka, Mohmadbas, Moolthan, Nagina, Nahrika, Nai Nagla, Nangal Mubarikpur, Nangal Sabat, Nangal Shahpur, Nangli, Nasirbas, Nawli, Nimkhera, Notki, Padla Shahpuri, Patakpur Ferozepur, Patan Udaipuri, Pathrali, Patkhori, Pithorpuri, Pol, Rajaka, Rajoli, Rangala Rajpur, Ranika, Ranyala Ferozepur, Ranyala Patakpur, Ranyali, Rawa, Rawli, Rigarh, Rithath, Sakras, Santhawari, Saral, Shadipur, Shahabpur, Shahmirbas, Shakarpuri, Sheikhpur, Sidhrawat, Siswan Jatka, Sohalpur, Sukhpuri, Sulaila, Sultanpur Nuh, Tigaon, Uleta, Umra, Umri.

== See also ==
- Pinangwan
- Gurgaon
- Haryana
- Jhirkeshwar mahadev
