= Islam Khan V =

18th-century Mughal nobleman

Mir Ahmad a.k.a. Mian Kheesa
- Reign: 17–18th century
- Successor: Barkhurdar Khan III
- Full name: Barkhurdar Khan II
- Born: Ferozepur Jhirka
- Died: 1734; Shahjahanbad
- Spouse: Sahib Daulat
- Father: Barkhurdar Khan I, Islam Khan IV

Islam Khan V (died 21 Safar 1147 AH/1734 AD) was one of the prominent Emirs and noblemen during the Mughal Empire. He was titled "Islam Khan" and "Barkhurdar Khan" by Emperor Bahadur Shah I and held many important posts during the successive rules of Bahadur Shah I, Jahandar Shah, Farrukhsiyar, Rafi ud Darajat, Shah Jahan II and Muhammad Shah.

== Biography ==
Barkhurdar Khan II a.k.a. Mian Kheesa was the son of Barkhurdar Khan I and great-grandson of Islam Khan I. Barkhurdar Khan II was Mansabdar Punj Hazari (5,000) and also entitled "Islam Khan" by Shah Alam I and had Mansab "Darogha Dīwān-e-Khās" (Superintendent of the Diwan-i-Khas) and Khalat-e Fakhra and Khalat-e Barani. He was "Mir Atash" (the master gunner) to Bahadur Shah I before his retirement from court, but was restored to his rank of 5,000 (3,000 horse), and appointed Mir Tuzak Awwal (chief Mir Tuzak / quarter-master general).

This "Islam Khan" (d. 1144 AH/1731–1732) was one Mir Ahmad, first "Barkhurdar Khan", then "Islam Khan", son of Safi Khan (d. 1105 AH/1693–1694), the second son of Abdus-salam, first "Ikhtisas Khan", then "Islam Khan", Mashhadi, (d. 1057 AH/1647–1648).

This Islam Khan played a crucial role in negotiating a settlement during the crises of the (clash of the nobles) with the Sayyid Brothers.

== Awards and honours ==
- Shah Alam I alias Bahadur Shah I in his first Juloos (royal procession / parade) in the early days of Rabi' al-thani awarded the title Islam Khan, Mansab "Darogha Dīwān-e-Khās" (Superintendent of the Diwan-i-Khas) along with Khalat-e Fakhra, Naqqara and "Ilm"
- Shah Alam I in his second Juloos on 9 Dhu al-Qi'dah appointed him "Darogha Topkhana", a store of Armory (military)
- Shah Alam I in his third Juloos on 15 Jumada al-awwal awarded him Khalat-e Barani
- In the third Juloos of Shah Alam I on 13 Shawwal, prince awarded him Khalat
- Islam Khan was appointed as 'Mir Atash' (the master gunner) to Shah Alam I
- Shah Alam I in his fourth Juloos on 8 Jumada al-Thani awarded Khalat in praise of "Mir Atash"
- 'Islam Khan Bahadur Mir Atash' was included in the front-runner battalion in a war during fourth Juloos on 19 Shawwal of Shah Alam I
- Shah Alam I in his fourth Juloos on 22 Shawwal awarded Khalat-e Chaar Parcha
- Shah Alam I in his fifth Juloos on 19 Rajab 1123 AH (1711) appointed Islam Khan as "Mir Tuzak Awwal" (chief Mir Tuzak / quarter-master general) along with Khalat-e Fakhra
- Shah Alam I in his fifth Juloos 1711 awarded Islam Khan Mir Atash with Mansabdar Punj Hazari (5,000) and 2000 + 500 Sawar
- On Friday 15 Dhu al-Hijjah, in the second Juloos of Emperor Farrukhsiyar, "Islam Khan" and his close relative Khan Zaman Khan Ali Asghar attended the Friday prayer along with Emperor Farrukhsiyar
- On 20 Muharram in the second Juloos of Muhammad Shah, he got the opportunity to meet and discuss the king at Masjid Moth
- Islam Khan V (Barkhurdar Khan II) along with his close relative Khan Zaman Khan Ali Asghar were invited to attend the marriage ceremony of the prince of Shah Alam I
- In some last dates of Muharram in the 6 Juloos, he was appointed as "Bakshigiri Tan" (Salary officer) in place of Aitamuddaula. He was also awarded with Khalat-e Khas and one ornate "Qabza-i dhup" (canopy). However, on 12th Shaban 1125 AH, 2 September 1713, Ghazi-uddin Khan (Ahmad Beg) obtained charge of the retinue (jalau), vice Islam Khan, who had held it in addition to his principal office of Mir Tuzak.

== Death ==
Hakim Syed Zillur Rahman in his book Hayat Karam Husain quoted his date of death as 21 Safar 1147 AH/1734 with reference to Tarikh-i Mohammadi while other authors mentioned his death date as 1144 AH/1731–32.

== Family history ==
The family of Barkhurdar Khan belonged to Salim Chishti. Islam Khan I was his forefather. This family maintained the tradition of receiving the title "Islam Khan" from the Mughal emperors.

One of the daughters of Qazi Syed Rafi Mohammad was married to Qazi Ghulam Mustafa, and another daughter Sahib Daulat was married to Barkhurdar Khan II. Because of these relationships, Islam Khan V was close to Khan Zaman Khan Ali Asghar. Both achieved important posts in the court of Mughal kings.

== Marriage and children ==
Barkhurdar II married Sahib Daulat, the daughter of Qazi Syed Rafi Mohammad and had two sons – elder son Ghulam Baqi a.k.a. Maddan was also entitled 'Barkhurdar Khan' (Barkhurdar III), while his younger son Ghulam Mohammad a.k.a. Saddan was killed (martyred) during the fight between the English forces and Shuja-ud-Daula in 1765. Ghulam Baqi was married to his cousin (daughter of Mah Bibi bint Qazi Syed Rafi Mohammad and Noorul Haq ibn Mian Abdur Rahman of Tijara)

== See also ==
- Ferozepur Jhirka
