= Khalat =

Traditional garment of Central and South Asia

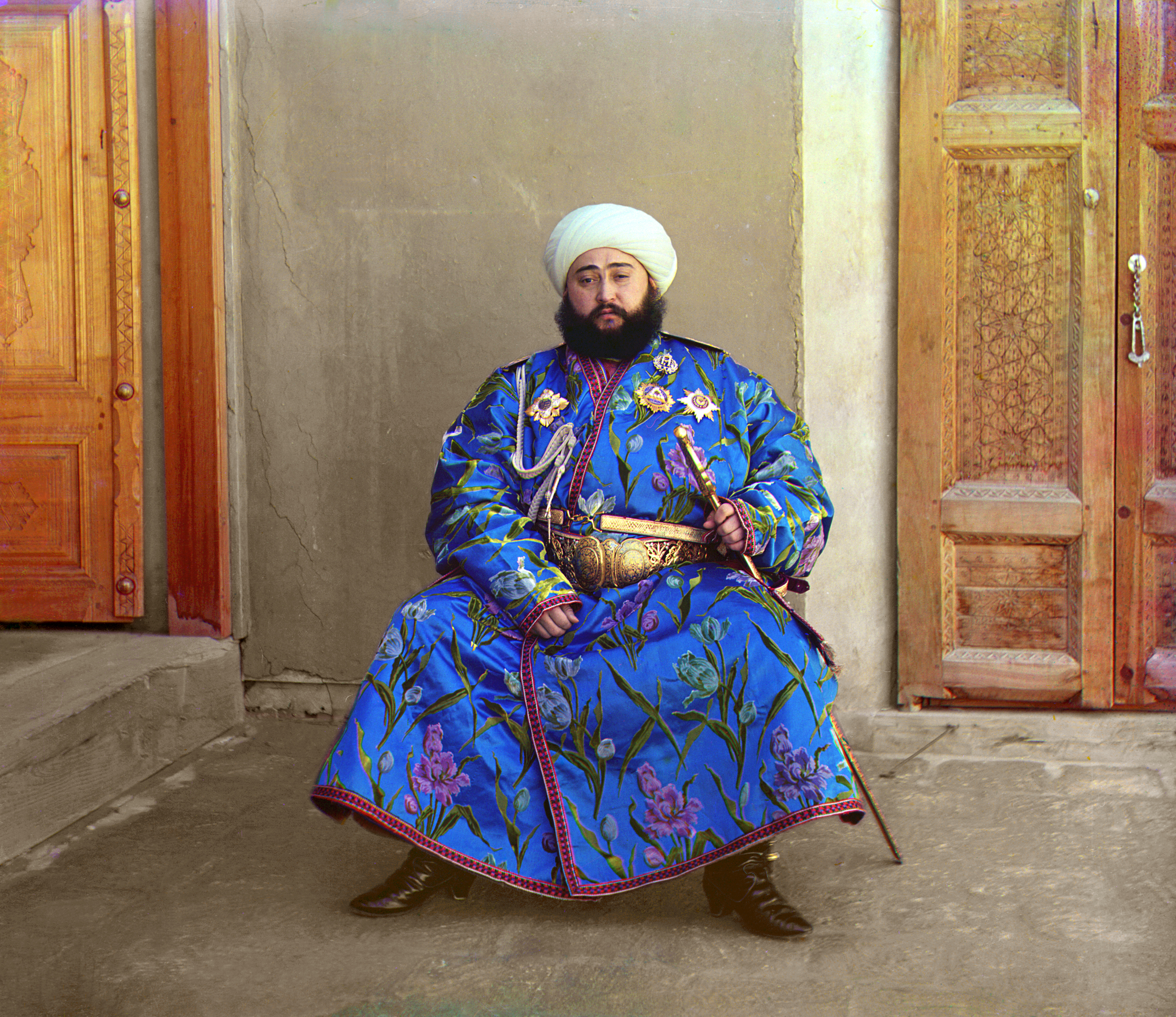
Mohammed Alim Khan (1880–1944), emir of Bukhara, wearing a khalat

A khalat (Persian: خلعت, from Arabic: خِلْعَة, romanized: khilat) is a loose, long-sleeved outer silk or cotton robe common in Central Asia and South Asia and worn both by men and women, although in differing styles.

== History ==
Historically, richly adorned khalats have been used as robes of honour. Khilat was also used to denote the ceremony of awarding the honorific robe. Such social aspects of clothing have been known in many societies. By the 19th century in British India the word khilat had come to mean any gift of money or goods the Government of India awarded in return for service from tributary princes, khans and tribal leaders.

== Cultural variation ==
=== Central Asia ===
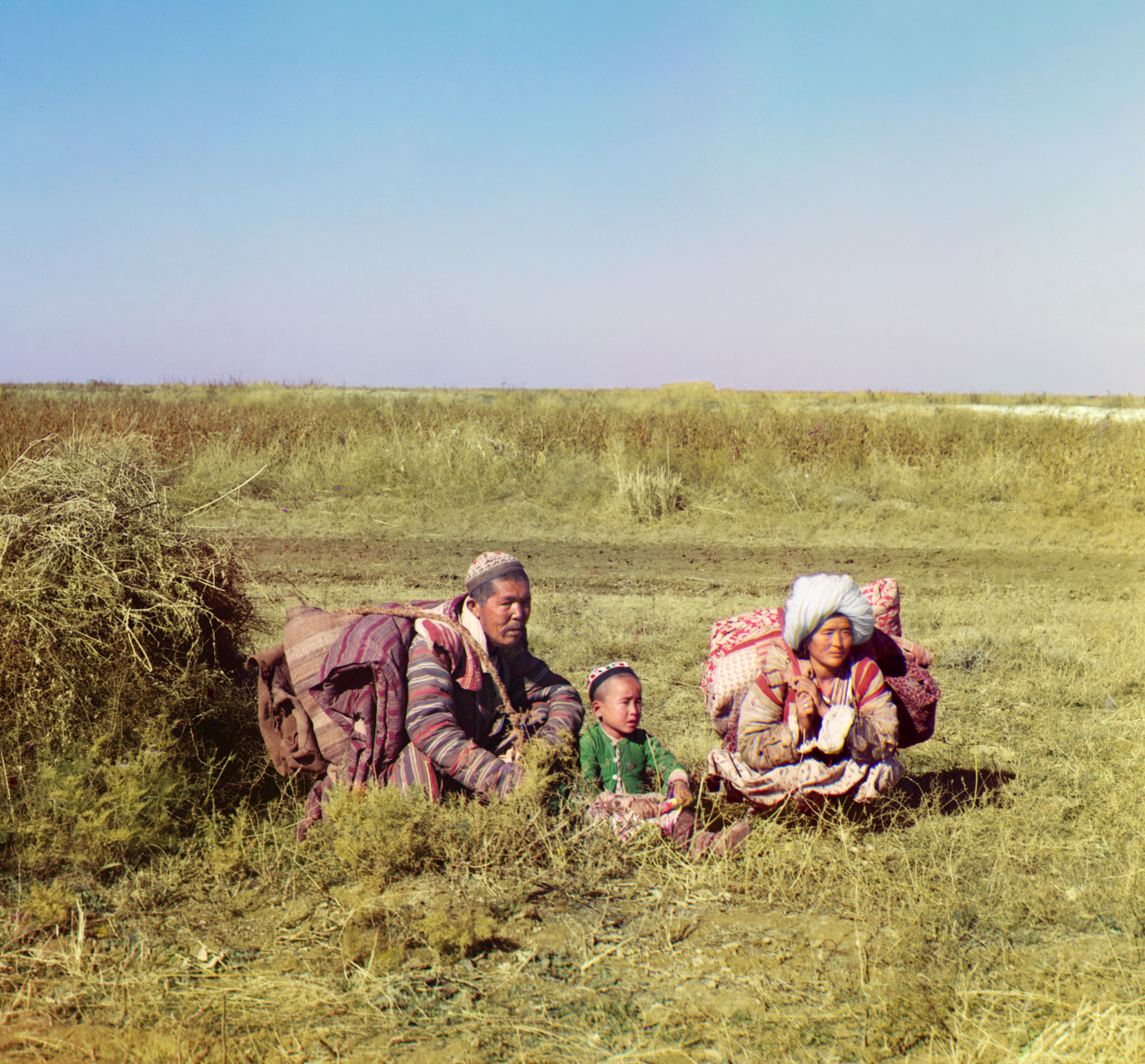
Kyrgyz family wearing khalats, 1911

Central Asian khalats can be thin, decorative garments or thick, full-length robes that provide good protection from exposure to heat, light, and cold.

=== Eastern Europe ===
Khilat is one of many borrowings in Russian, where khalat has become a generic term for various robes.

In Romanian the word is halat is used, meaning dressing gown, bathrobe, smock, camouflage cloak, etc. A similar garment is known as Chapan in Turkic.

The khalat (Yiddish: כלאַט, romanized: khlat) was also worn by Ashkenazi Jewish men in Eastern Europe before the early 20th century. These were long, close-fitting coats with shawl collars and pockets. Khlats were cotton garments meant for everyday wear; more luxurious versions were made of velvet or silk and worn for Shabbat or other holidays.

== See also ==
- Kaftan
- Chapan
- Robe of honour
