= Mansabdar =

Rank and obligation system of the Mughal Empire

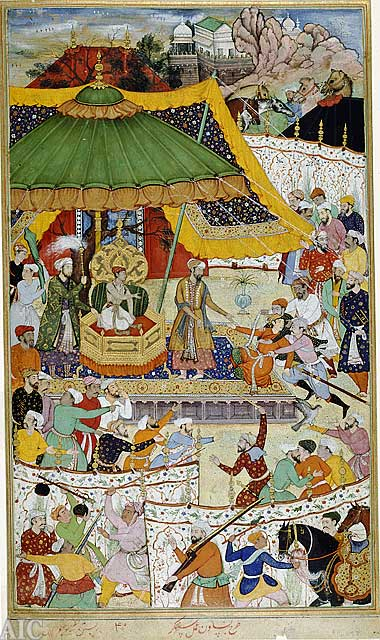
The court of Akbar, from the Akbarnama. A mansab fixed its holder's precedence at gatherings such as this, together with his pay and the cavalry he owed the state.

The mansabdari system was the framework of graded ranks through which the Mughal Empire appointed, paid and obliged its officers. Every civil and military servant of the empire above the lowest levels held a mansab, a numerical rank that fixed his precedence, determined his salary, and bound him to maintain a stated number of cavalry with horses and equipment. A mansab conferred no office in itself, and its holder could be posted to almost any branch of the administration. Because the empire's civil officers were drawn from the holders of these military ranks, the arrangement fused the army, the nobility and the civil service into a single hierarchy, and it covered every public service except the judiciary.

The ranks were decimal, an inheritance from Mongol and Timurid practice, and branding and descriptive rolls had precedents under the Delhi Sultanate and Sher Shah. The system in its developed form is associated with Akbar, although historians disagree whether it should be dated to a single moment in the 1570s or treated as accreting across the second half of his reign. From about 1595 a mansab was stated as two numbers: the zat, which governed personal pay and standing, and the sawar, which governed the contingent to be maintained. What the pair meant has been contested since the nineteenth century, with Blochmann, Irvine, R. P. Tripathi and Abdul Aziz all proposing different readings; Aziz's account is now the standard one, though M. Athar Ali held that the zat figure became largely fictitious from the close of Akbar's reign.

Mansabdars were paid either in cash or, more often, by jagir, an assignment of land revenue that carried no rights of ownership or residence and was normally transferred every few years. Because assessed valuations regularly exceeded actual collections, salaries and military obligations alike came to be scaled by a system of "month" ratios, and from Shah Jahan's reign contingents were formally set at a third, a quarter or a fifth of nominal rank. The salary bill was enormous, absorbing on one reconstruction some 80 per cent of the empire's assessed revenue. Verification rested on branding horses and keeping descriptive rolls of men, administered by the mir bakhshi, whose certification was required before pay was released; even so, contemporaries and modern historians agree that contingents habitually fell short of their paper strength.

The system was also the instrument by which the Mughals recruited a deliberately mixed elite of Turanis, Iranis, Afghans, Indian Muslims, Rajputs and, under Aurangzeb, Deccanis and Marathas. Its later history is dominated by the jagirdari crisis, the growing mismatch between the number of rank-holders and the pool of assignable revenue, whose causes and significance remain disputed among Satish Chandra, Athar Ali, Irfan Habib and their critics. After 1707 the ranks decayed into hereditary and largely honorific holdings, and elements of the form survived in the successor states. Comparison with the Ottoman timar has been common since Bernier, though historians differ over how far it holds. Scholarship on the subject moved from the philological work of Blochmann and Irvine, through Moreland, Aziz and Ibn Hasan, to the statistical turn of the Aligarh historians, and more recently to revisionists who question the picture of a tightly centralised bureaucracy.

== Terminology ==
the army, the peerage and the civil administration all rolled into one

— Abdul Aziz on the fusion of functions in a single ladder of rank, 1945

The Persian word mansab is a loan from Arabic, denoting the place in which a thing is set or fixed, from nasb kardan, to place, fix or appoint, and by extension the state of occupying a place, a dignity or an office. William Irvine, who noted that the term was already current in Central Asia before the Mughals entered Hindustan, rendered it in English as "rank", on the ground that its function was to settle precedence and grade pay rather than to designate any particular office. M. Athar Ali glosses it as "office, position, rank", the word indicating its holder's place in the official hierarchy. A mansabdar was the holder of such a rank; mansabdari is the adjective formed from it, and the compound "mansabdari system" is a modern coinage of the historiography rather than a Mughal administrative term.

What the rank denoted was unusual. A mansab was not itself an office, and conferred none. It simultaneously fixed its holder's status, set his pay, and laid on him the obligation to maintain a stated number of troopers with horses and equipment. Because the empire's civil officers were drawn from the holders of these military ranks, Abdul Aziz described the resulting institution as "the army, the peerage and the civil administration all rolled into one", the mansab being the idiom in which official hierarchy and social standing were alike expressed. In Athar Ali's account promotion and demotion took the form of additions to and subtractions from those two figures, and the organisation covered the military, civil and financial services, that is every branch of public service except the judiciary. Jos Gommans notes the formal consequence: every senior official, whatever his actual duties, had to be entered on the army list as the nominal commander of a given number of horsemen.

The rank was dual. The first number, the zat (literally body, person or self), governed the holder's personal allowances and his place in the hierarchy; the second, the sawar or horseman rank, denoted the cavalry he was required and paid to maintain. Irvine explained the terminology as a historical residue: the original single mansab, which had governed personal allowances, came to be called the zat rank once a separate figure for additional horsemen was attached to it, so that a man would be styled, for example, 2,500 zat, 1,000 sawar. The troopers themselves were the tabinan, whose pay was disbursed separately from the mansabdar's own. A mansabdar's conventional style was taken from the zat figure alone, so that a man rated 1,000 zat and 500 sawar bore the title hazari, "commander of a thousand", although his actual contingent was half that.

Rank and nobility were not synonymous. Irvine recorded a threefold grouping in use alongside the bare numbers: holders of 20 to 400 were "officers with rank"; those of 500 to 2,500 were nobles, amir, plural umara, the origin of the English "Omrah"; and those of 3,000 to 7,000 were great nobles, umara-i kibar. Where the lines fell was already unclear to contemporaries. Nizamuddin Ahmad stated that the title amir was given to all holding mansabs from 500 upwards, while Blochmann confessed himself "not quite sure" whether it was not instead restricted to holders of 1,000 and above. Aziz found no original authority that clearly demarcated the great nobles from the ordinary umara, or the umara from the mansabdars beneath them. Modern practice follows John F. Richards's formulation, that all nobles held mansabs but not all mansabdars were nobles, with the threshold at 500 zat under Akbar and 1,000 zat by the seventeenth century. Athar Ali adopted 1,000 as the dividing line between mere officials and those with a voice in government, while cautioning that the English word "nobility" is retained only for convenience and implies no comparability with the Roman nobiles or the feudal nobility of Europe.

A separate vocabulary marked descent within the service. A khanazad, literally "son of the house", was an officer who could claim hereditary family service to the emperor, a self-description that evoked loyalty and obedience without the intensity of discipleship. Titles formed a currency distinct from rank: no two nobles held the same title at once, and great care was taken that a man who had not reached the requisite standing should not be styled Khan. Irvine described the usual progression, by which a man first became a Khan attached to his own name and might later receive a compound title thought to suit his qualities, such as Ikhlas Khan, "Lord Sincerity".

Finally, the mansab must be distinguished from the assignment that paid it. Pay, tankhwah, might be given in cash, naqd, or as a jagir, an assignment of the land revenue of a stated number of villages or of a pargana. Only mansabdars could hold a jagir, all other imperial staff being paid in cash. Both rank and assignment were held at the emperor's pleasure and limited to a life tenure, and a mansabdar's cash and valuables escheated to the crown at his death.

== Origins ==
=== Decimal antecedents ===
The decimal shape of the ranks was inherited rather than invented. Richards derives the ordering from the Mongol system of grading military commanders as leaders of ten, a hundred, a thousand and ten thousand, and notes that the later Timurids and the Sur dynasty used similar terminology, although actual troop numbers commonly fell short of the nominal titles. Gommans agrees that the mansab was decimal from the outset and reminiscent of the Central Asian tümen, while stressing a difference of function: the Mughal ladder was a hierarchy of rank and imperial favour rather than of military command, since the Mughals constituted commands afresh for each operation. Aziz observed that decimal division of armies was probably much older than Chinggis Khan, and Athar Ali that under the Delhi Sultans a decimal cavalry organisation was already the ideal.

=== Sultanate and Sur precedents ===
The two devices that later policed the system, branding and the descriptive roll, were likewise older. Irvine traced the branding of cavalry horses to Alauddin Khalji in AH 712 (1312–13), after whose death the practice lapsed, and its revival to Sher Shah in AH 948 (1541–42). Sher Shah stated that he had introduced branding and muster rolls to stop the frauds practised under Sikandar Lodi, and to ensure that every man should maintain soldiers according to his rank and not vary his numbers. Saran, examining the Sur administration, found a mansabdari in only a rudimentary stage, confined to officers, in the sense of military service in return for a payment carrying a proportionate obligation to supply troops; the fully elaborated system he reserved for Akbar.

The vocabulary had not yet settled either. Aziz noted that in Sher Shah's day the word mansab was not used of a rank-holder, who was instead described as the possessor of so many horse. Between Babur's invasion and Akbar's early years the older tradition of commands was followed only loosely, neither Babur nor Humayun having had the leisure to reform the army.

=== The problem to be solved ===
Abu'l-Fazl describes the condition the reforms were meant to correct. Officers sold their horses, served on foot or produced worthless mounts, and horse-borrowing, he wrote, was then the order of the day. Gommans reads him as saying that the mansab was intended to end the arbitrariness of earlier recruitment, when honour was bartered for silver and gold. Athar Ali holds that dishonesty among the nobles was so widespread that a paper order could not remove it, which is why the branding of horses (dagh) and the descriptive roll of men (chehra) were introduced alongside the grading itself.

Political pressure pointed the same way. Between 1564 and 1567 Akbar faced the Uzbek rebellion led by Khan-i Zaman, governor of Jaunpur, which collapsed only on 9 July 1567, when its leader fell in battle. Streusand stresses that Khan-i Zaman did not seek the throne, his grievances concerning the terms of service of Akbar's officers, which makes the revolt directly pertinent to the later reform of service. The Mirzas, descendants of Timur's son Umar Shaykh, revolted in the Punjab that spring and joined him. The reforms followed immediately on the Gujarat campaign of 1572–73.

== Establishment under Akbar ==
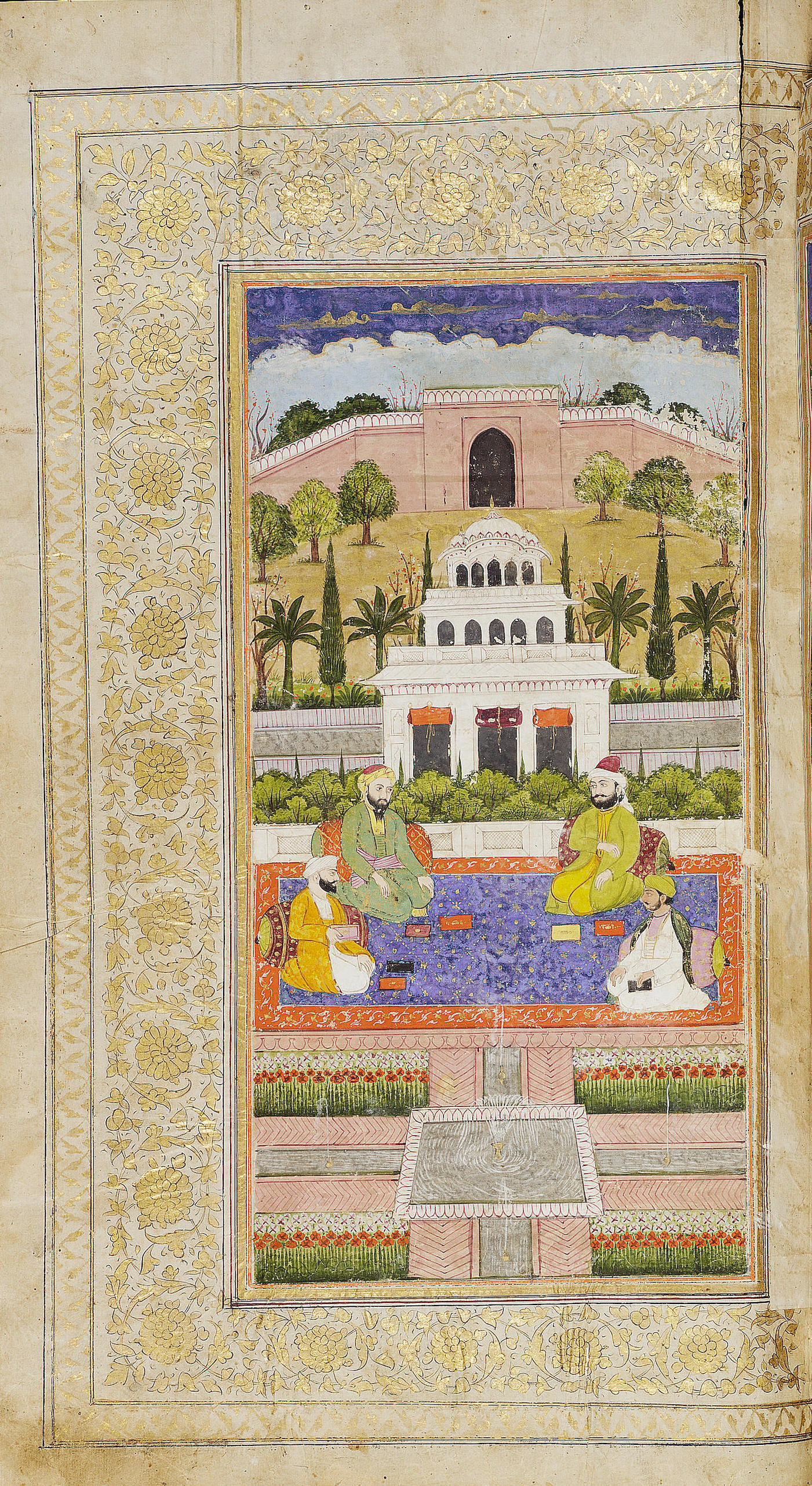
Abul Fazl presenting the completed chronicle. His Ain-i Akbari is the fullest contemporary account of the ranks, their salary schedules and their establishments.

=== Dating the reforms ===
When the system began is contested, and the disagreement starts in the sources. Blochmann's note to the Ain-i Akbari says that branding was revived in AH 981 (1573), when Shahbaz Khan Kambu was appointed mir bakhshi, and that he followed the regulations of Alauddin Khalji. The text of the Ain itself places the introduction of branding in the eighteenth regnal year and says the ranks of the men were laid down at the same time. A third statement, in Blochmann's biographical notice of Mirza Aziz Koka, dates the dagh to the twentieth regnal year and records that it caused great dissatisfaction among the umara. Irvine followed the Ain and dated the re-establishment of branding to the eighteenth regnal year, about 1573–74, noting many early difficulties and attempted evasions.

Modern accounts divide between a date and a span. Streusand states flatly that Akbar established the system in 1574 with the help of a cadre of expert bureaucrats, though he elsewhere concedes that its precursors and evolution are complex and uncertain, holding only that it was operating in recognisable form by 1575. Gommans treats the formative period as running from about 1573 to 1596. Aziz likewise regarded the system as accreting over decades rather than being founded at a stroke, its framework becoming fully visible only in the Ain as it stood in the fortieth regnal year.

=== Branding and the descriptive roll ===
According to Abu'l-Fazl the descriptive roll came first and pay was made dependent on it, the imperial brand being withheld at the outset because Akbar had accepted advice that branding an animal was cruel; only when evasion continued was branding added. Rolls alone had indeed proved insufficient, since horses answering to the written description could be hired and substituted. The chehra set down a horseman's age, stature, complexion, features and identifying marks, his place of origin, his caste or tribe and the names of the man and his father, the horse's breed, colour and body marks being registered separately. Two brands were then used, the imperial mark on one side of the animal and the mansabdar's own on the other, the procedure being called dagh-o-mahalli or simply dagh. The bakhshi presided over a distinct branch for branding and verification (dagh-o-tashiha), staffed under a superintendent of its own, and enlistment was expressed idiomatically as bringing a horse to be branded.

Abd al-Qadir Badauni credits Shahbaz Khan, as mir bakhshi, with introducing the rule, expressly modelled on Alauddin Khalji's practice and Sher Shah's law, under which every amir was to begin as a commander of twenty and be promoted to commander of a hundred once he had brought his twenty troopers' horses to the brand, and thence upward. Officers who failed at the musters were to be degraded; Badauni nonetheless records that the regulation was evaded. Resistance came from high quarters: Mirza Aziz Koka was so disobedient over the dagh that Akbar temporarily deprived him of his rank, and a courtier is said to have lost the emperor's favour permanently for calling the regime irksome.

=== The revenue experiment and the revolts ===
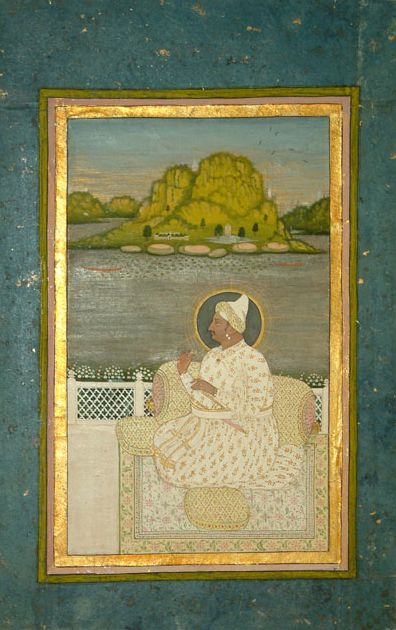
Todar Mal, who directed the revenue settlement that ran alongside the grading of officers.

The grading of officers was entangled with a simultaneous change in how they were paid. In the nineteenth regnal year Akbar substituted cash payment for assignment, converted the imperial territories into reserved crown land (khalisa), and divided the provinces of Hindustan into circles each yielding about a crore of tankas, whose collectors were accordingly called karoris. Tripathi records that 182 karoris were appointed in 1574, each with a treasurer and a clerk, and that the accompanying survey was carried out between 1574 and 1578. Habib notes that the measure brought the whole empire as it then stood, except Bengal, Bihar and Gujarat, under the khalisa, and that it proved to be, and was probably always intended to be, temporary. It was reported to have caused such oppression that peasants were dispersed and revenues fell, and Saran records that it was abandoned after about five years, after which assignment gradually returned. Dating here also varies: Streusand places the revenue programme in 1574 as an aspect of the same reforms, whereas Richards dates the drastic restructuring to 1580 under Todar Mal. In 1581–82 the crown-land regulations were extended to jagir lands, allowing assignment to survive while preventing jagirdars from administering their assignments as they pleased.

The measures were resented, and the resentment was political. Disaffected Chaghatay officers were at first handled by transfer, Akbar sending them out to the eastern frontier, where enforcement of the new rules was relaxed. When in 1580 he ended that exemption for Bihar and Bengal, the officers of both provinces revolted, stormed Tanda, executed the governor, and set up a rival Timurid government with Mirza Muhammad Hakim as emperor. Streusand rejects the common reading of the revolts of 1580–82 as a reaction to Akbar's religious innovations, arguing that the evidence points instead to resentment of his military and fiscal policies.

=== Emergence of the dual rank ===
The second number appeared late. Aziz identified the first concrete instance of a sawar rank in the composite grant to Prince Salim, whose zat was raised to 12,000 and who then received a sawar rank of 10,000 including 1,000 ahadis, a holding reconstructible only by combining two passages of the Akbarnama; the second award he placed in the forty-first regnal year, when Mirza Shahrukh received 5,000 zat and half that number sawar. From about that point the double form became usual in the chronicles. Streusand dates the separation to 1596–97 and explains it as a response to the inflexibility of tying rank to contingent size when court offices required status but not large followings. Gommans explains it similarly, by the impossibility of expressing both honour and real military stature in a single number. Athar Ali records a different explanation, Moreland's, that officers with high titles had seldom kept contingents to match, so that the dual rank was devised to meet that situation, the zat fixing hierarchical position and the sawar supplying a check on actual strength.

=== Composition and the princes ===
Akbar used the ranks to reshape who served. The Ain gives the policy in his own idiom: he employed people of all classes because employing one class to the exclusion of others causes rebellions, as with the Uzbeks and the Qizilbash, and he paid no regard to hereditary power, genealogy or fame. Mukhia credits Iqtidar Alam Khan with showing that Akbar deliberately altered the composition of the higher mansabdars, so that from a near-equal Turani and Irani split he had by about 1579–80 incorporated Rajputs, Indian Muslims and Afghans, reducing every group to a minority. Athar Ali adds that the government regulated the proportion of men of his own race or clan that a mansabdar might recruit, producing a diversity within unity that was itself capable of generating tension.

The ranks were extended to the emperor's sons. Streusand argues that Akbar's assignment of numerical ranks to his sons in 1577, classifying them as officers rather than as fellow sovereigns, ended collective sovereignty and the appanage system. Faruqui notes that mansab came to be used of a prince's independent source of revenue only after the 1580s.

Saran, writing in 1941, judged the result the most monumental of Akbar's schemes and defended it against the charge of being a retrograde step, pointing to such checks as frequent transfers, inspections and payment through the bakhshis.

== Structure of rank ==
=== Zat and sawar ===
From the later years of Akbar's reign a mansab was stated as two numbers, the zat or personal rank and the sawar or cavalry rank. The first indicated the officer's personal standing and, through the sanctioned pay schedules, his personal salary; the second determined the contingent he had to maintain and the payment he received for maintaining it. The full Persian formula ran, for example, chahar hazari zat wa si hazar sawar, four thousand personal and three thousand horse, conventionally abbreviated as 4,000/3,000.

Three conventions governed the pair. The zat figure was normally equal to or higher than the sawar; a zat rank without any sawar rank existed but was very rare, while a sawar rank never occurred without a zat. Precedence among nobles followed the zat alone, so that a man rated 4,000/2,000 outranked one rated 3,000/3,000. Aziz found only five instances in the whole of Mughal history in which the sawar exceeded the zat, and concluded that all five were errors of transcription. Athar Ali rejected that dismissal, showing that in the second half of Aurangzeb's reign a fairly large number of mansabdars genuinely held sawar ranks above their zat. He attributed the practice partly to a scarcity of able officers whom the emperor wished to entrust with larger contingents, and partly to economy, since raising the sawar rank alone increased forces without increasing personal pay, while stressing that it remained limited and was never a deliberate reform. Some apparent excesses, he added, arise only because a conditional sawar rank had been added on top of the ordinary one.

=== Interpretations of the dual rank ===
What the two numbers meant has been disputed since the nineteenth century, and the dispute is not merely antiquarian: on it depends whether Mughal army strength can be reconstructed from rank totals at all. Writing in 1941, Saran recorded a great divergence of opinion and set out the competing positions.

Blochmann's own note on the mansabs treats the zat as the titular figure and the sawar as the command actually held. A man styled commander of 5,000, he observed, seldom led anything like that number, real strength rarely coming close to what the title announced, so that the style panj hazari zat, si hazar sawar meant a commander of 5,000 personally, or by rank, in actual command of 3,000 cavalry. Comparing Abu'l-Fazl's list of grandees with Nizamuddin Ahmad's Tabaqat and the lists in the Padshahnama, he added that Abu'l-Fazl had given the zat rank alone and not the actual commands, which would have shown the strength of the contingents. In Saran's summary Irvine took the reverse view, treating the zat as the men genuinely kept up and the sawar as an honour that nevertheless carried the number it named, while R. P. Tripathi held the sawar to be honorific, bringing an extra allowance but imposing no duty to maintain the horsemen it specified. Irvine's own text does describe the grant of a sawar rank as an honour, and holds that the published pay tables covered the zat rank exclusively, out of which the officer met his transport, his household and some horsemen, the sawar men being paid separately as tabinan. Aziz judged that Irvine took no definite position but wavered between the various hypotheses, which is why he is cited on both sides of the question. Irvine was nonetheless decisive on one point. Totalling every zat mansab held at any one moment, he argued, would give an army that the country could not have paid for however heavily it were taxed; whatever correspondence between rank and men serving may have existed under Akbar was, he thought, quite at an end by Shah Jahan's reign.

A further position was advanced by C. S. K. Rao Sahib, who proposed that the zat rank represented infantry and the sawar cavalry, resting his case on a passage of the Tuzuk in which Baqir Khan, rated 1,500/500, paraded 1,000 horse and 2,000 foot. Aziz rejected it on three grounds. On Rao Sahib's reading the surviving lists would imply well over a million infantry at the end of Akbar's reign, whereas the fighting infantry Akbar actually kept numbered 12,000 matchlock-bearers at most; the Ain and the period directories would have said so had the zat entailed foot; and mansabdars would have paraded infantry at the musters, which they demonstrably did not. If the zat meant infantry, he added, then before the sawar rank was introduced the whole army would have been infantry, which is contrary to the known facts. His verdict was that the contention stood unproved.

Aziz's own account, first published in 1930, is that the official descriptions mean what they say. Athar Ali credits Moreland and Aziz jointly with establishing what is now the standard reading, and the modern literature follows it.

Athar Ali added the qualification that has since become standard. From the closing years of Akbar's reign the zat number itself became a fictitious figure, its chief uses being to fix salary by the schedule in force and to place its holder in the hierarchy. He found the germ of the arrangement in earlier Indo-Muslim practice, citing Barani's malik Baq Baq, nominally a commander of 10,000 who kept 4,000 troopers. Mukhia illustrates the resulting gap with a mansabdar of 1,000/400, who ranked with a commander of a thousand but commanded four hundred. Under Akbar, by contrast, Richards holds that the trooper rank still matched the cavalry actually mustered.

=== Classes and grades ===
The Ain grades mansabdars by how nearly their contingents matched their rank: an officer whose contingent equalled his mansab fell in the first class, one with half or more in the second, and one with less in the third. Monthly grants varied accordingly, and the emperor sometimes raised a servant's mansab while reducing his contingent. Abu'l-Fazl illustrates the graded scale with commanders of a hundred, who fell into eleven classes: those furnishing a full hundred troopers drew 700 rupees monthly and those with none of their own 500, the nine intermediate classes falling by 20 rupees for every ten troopers short. Irvine argued that the very existence of the three grades below 500 proves that small odd sawar ranks such as 300/10 or 400/50 were real and not a formality. Aziz and Gommans alike read the regulation as an inducement, a high sawar rank raising both the holder's zat salary and his standing and so stimulating mansabdars to maximise their contingents.

The ladder itself ran from dahbashi, commander of ten, to dah-hazari, commander of ten thousand, with all commands above five thousand reserved for the emperor's sons. The Ain counts sixty-six grades, matching the numerical value of the letters of the name of God, which it reads as an auspicious omen. Blochmann concluded that of these sixty-six only about thirty-three ever existed in reality, a judgement Irvine repeated. Richards describes the theoretical sixty-six differently, as even-numbered ranks beginning at twenty zat. In later reigns the rank of ten was dropped and the ceiling rose, ranks above 7,000 being reserved as a rule for princes. Habib puts the highest rank permitted to a non-royal noble at 7,000 zat, 7,000 sawar, and Richards records that the four highest-ranking nobles under Shah Jahan each held exactly that. Princely ranks went far higher: Habib gives Dara Shikoh 20,000 zat, 20,000 sawar and 10,000 du-aspa sih-aspa in Shah Jahan's twentieth year, a holding worth some 40 crore dams, about a third of the assessed revenue of the crown lands, rising to 40,000 zat by the thirtieth year.

Annual zat salary in rupees under the schedule current at Aurangzeb's death.
Zat rank	First class	Second class	Third class
10,000	500,000	not divided	
9,000	450,000	not divided	
8,000	400,000	not divided	
7,000	350,000	not divided	
6,000	300,000	not divided	
5,000	250,000	242,500	235,000
2,000	100,000	92,500	85,000
1,500	75,000	67,500	60,000
1,000	50,000	47,500	45,000
500	20,000	18,750	17,500
300	10,000	9,500	9,000
200	7,500	7,000	6,500

=== Du-aspa sih-aspa and conditional ranks ===
The principal innovation under Jahangir was the du-aspa sih-aspa, literally two-horse three-horse, rank. Both Athar Ali and Aziz date the earliest recorded instance to Jahangir's tenth regnal year, when 1,700 of Mahabat Khan's sawars were made du-aspa sih-aspa as a mark of distinction on his posting to the Deccan; Aziz notes that the wording of the Tuzuk shows the terminology had not yet crystallised. In theory the designation formed a component within the sawar rank and could never exceed it, the official formula "4,000 zat, 4,000 sawar, all du-aspa sih-aspa" meaning 4,000 plus a doubled 4,000; any portion of the sawar rank not so designated was termed barawurdi. Both the pay and the military obligation attaching to a du-aspa sih-aspa trooper were exactly double those of an ordinary one. The device therefore allowed the emperor to require a larger contingent, or to show favour, without raising the zat rank, which normally had to remain the higher of the two. Gommans reads it as a check on rank inflation, since a man of 2,000/1,000 who could offer 3,000 retainers might be rated 2,000/2,000 with a 1,000 du-aspa sih-aspa component instead of being promoted to 3,000/3,000, though he judges that the rank became increasingly detached from any real assessment and ended as a matter of accountancy. Its use spread steadily: among mansabdars of 1,000 zat and above, holders numbered 19 of 191 in Shah Jahan's tenth year and 25 of 253 in his thirtieth, rising under Aurangzeb to at least 68 of 486 in the first part of the reign and 70 of 575 in the second.

A second qualification was the conditional or mashrut rank. Irvine describes it as an addition to a man's permanent unconditional rank, held only while he retained a particular office such as a subahdar or faujdar, and surrendered with the office. Athar Ali explains the logic: if a faujdar needed an extra hundred sawars for his duties, his mansab was conditionally increased by that number and a jagir provided for the salary, the conditional mansab being cancelled and the jagir resumed on transfer. He gives worked instances, such as Shuja'at Khan, appointed faujdar of Jodhpur, whose conditional promotion of 4,000 sawar brought his rank to 5,000/8,000. Conversion of a conditional mansab into an unconditional one counted as a promotion and was usually granted as a mark of favour. The eighteenth-century writer Rai Anand Ram Mukhlis records the same twofold division of the sawar rank into unconditional and conditional.

Gommans summarises the resulting instrument as containing four overlapping ingredients: a rough indication of imperial hierarchy rather than a rigid command structure, a personal salary payable irrespective of service, a flexible earmarked subsidy for recruiting mounted troops, and, as the mansab became commodified, a marker of its holder's value on the military labour market.

== Pay and assignment ==
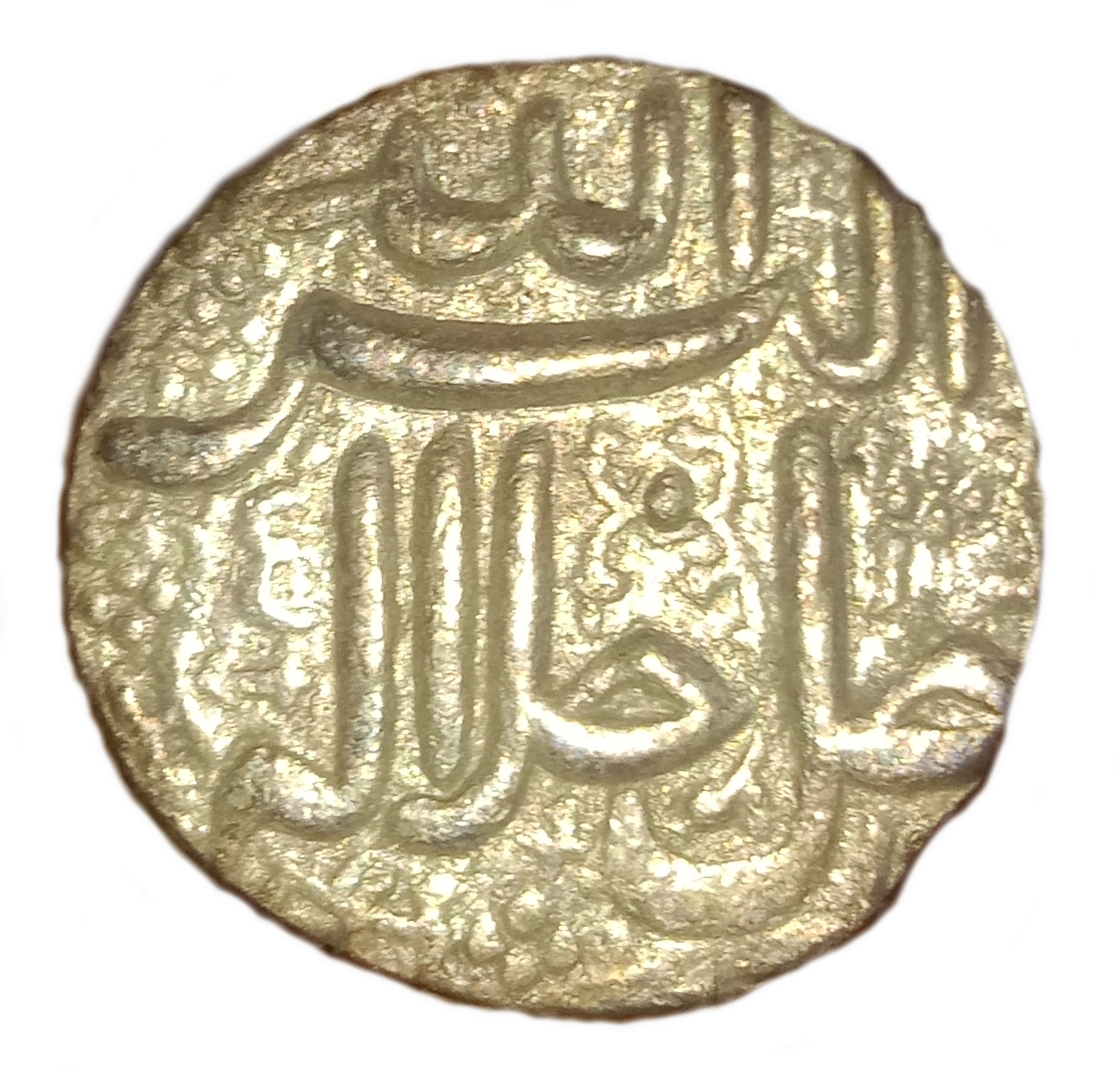
A silver rupee of Akbar. Salaries were reckoned in dams, forty to the rupee, but disbursed partly in specie.

=== Salary schedules ===
A mansabdar's total claim, his talab, had two components: a personal salary attached to the zat rank, and a much larger allowance attached to the sawar rank intended to fund his cavalry. The second was always substantially the greater. The two were also calculated differently. Zat pay was tabulated rank by rank rather than derived from a formula, so that it did not rise in arithmetical proportion as one moved up the ladder, and below 5,000 it was set at one of three class rates according to how nearly the sawar rank approached the zat. Mansabdars of 5,000 and above were not divided into classes and all drew the first-class rate. Sawar pay, by contrast, was reckoned at a flat rate per unit of rank, 8,000 dams under Shah Jahan and Aurangzeb, and simply multiplied out, because it was in effect a contract sum for maintaining a contingent.

The Ain sets out, for each zat rank, how many riding horses, elephants, pack animals and carts were to be kept up, alongside the monthly salary in its three classes. By the end of Aurangzeb's reign the annual zat salary ran from Rs 500,000 at the head of the ladder down to Rs 20,000 at 500 zat, graded into three classes at every rank below 5,000. Aziz noted that his manuscript schedule tallied completely with the tables Irvine had printed from British Museum manuals, and that assignment orders in favour of Raja Jai Singh show the same rates already in force under Shah Jahan, so that the schedule current at Aurangzeb's death dates back to about 1630, Shah Jahan's rates being carried over by Aurangzeb without alteration. An earlier and independent check comes from William Hawkins, who reported that a mansabdar of 100 zat and 100 sawar drew Rs 700 a month, one of 100 zat without a sawar rank Rs 500, and that every increase of ten in the sawar rank added Rs 20 to the monthly salary.

Accounts were kept in the dam, a money of account of which forty went to the rupee. Where the Ain states salaries in rupees the later schedules state them in dams, because the jama at which each pargana was assessed for assignment was reckoned in that unit. The forty-to-one ratio, fixed in Akbar's later years, could not be held after his death because copper appreciated, so the accounting dam became a purely notional fraction of the rupee with no relation to the circulating copper coin.

=== Cash and jagir ===
Assignment was the favoured mode of payment, although infantry, artillery and others on the emperor's own list were normally paid in cash. The proportions were not as lopsided as the emphasis on jagirs suggests: Athar Ali's figures for Aurangzeb's reign classify 7,457 imperial servants as cash-paid against 6,992 jagirdars, and Sarkar, using the same manuscript, gives about 7,500 paid in cash against 4,000 holding jagirs in 1690.

Because a jagir had to be worth the sanctioned pay, a standing assessment, the jama, was prepared for each unit of territory. The assignee was entitled to collect the whole revenue due to the state from his area, principally land revenue but also assorted cesses, and nothing beyond it. He acquired no permanent rights, no judicial powers, which belonged to the qazi, and, if a small assignee, no police powers either, which belonged to the faujdar; and each revenue paper he drew up had to be copied to the qanungo, the officer permanently stationed in the locality.

Transfer was the defining feature. All jagirs except watan jagirs were liable to be moved every three or four years, and Faruqui reckons that an appointee could on average claim the income of an award for about three years before it passed to someone else. Sehwan in Sind was transferred no fewer than seventeen times in the forty-three years between 1591 and 1634. Richards qualifies the picture, putting routine transfer at every two to three years but observing that higher-ranked jagirdars often held entire parganas for ten years or more. A sudden move could leave a jagirdar out of pocket if he had not yet collected what was owed him, and an outgoing assignee might be required to collect the arrears and hand them to the crown. The consequence most stressed in the literature is fiscal. Because he held his lands for so short a time, the jagirdar had no long-term interest in their prosperity, which drove up the effective revenue demand, a tendency for which Bernier's remark that there was no point improving land one might soon lose is Habib's evidence. Athar Ali concluded that the individual jagirdar had every temptation to kill the goose that laid the golden eggs for his whole class.

=== Month-scales and deductions ===
The jama was an assessed valuation, while the hasil was what the jagirdar actually collected, and the two regularly diverged. The gap was openly acknowledged and quantified: for each mahal the officials calculated the ratio of receipts to the standing assessment, which changed from year to year, and stated it as a month-proportion, so that a jagir yielding its full assessment was styled twelve-monthly and one yielding half was six-monthly. Where the assessment was accepted as inflated a permanent reduction could be sanctioned, the jagirdar retaining a claim for the shortfall, while receipts substantially above the sanctioned ratio could be recovered from him. Akbar accepted the principle that where an assignee's good administration produced an increase, the gain should stay with him by way of a corresponding rise in rank.

The month-scale governed obligation as well as pay. When an assignment was rated at less than twelve months the number of cavalry the holder had to recruit was reduced in proportion. Blochmann inferred from the Padishahnama that a quarter of the number implied by a mansabdar's title was the average actual strength of contingents under that reign. Athar Ali insisted, against a contrary view, that the month-scale reduced the personal zat salary as well as the sawar allowance, and noted that since six-month scales became usual under Aurangzeb the reduction in nobles' salaries was considerable. The practice may predate Shah Jahan: in 1605–6 the governor of Sind ordered that the pay of his contingents be reduced from eight-monthly to six-monthly. Aziz put the cumulative effect plainly: one trooper cost Akbar the salary of one, while under Shah Jahan the same trooper cost the pay of three or four, occasionally five.

Cash-paid mansabdars were treated differently again. Their contingent pay was reckoned per horseman rather than per unit of rank, at Rs 40 a head monthly on a twelve-month footing and falling with the scale, a schedule Habib traces to a farman of Shah Jahan's twenty-seventh year and explains as reflecting fewer remounts and poorer horses and riders at the lower ratios; Aurangzeb protested against its enforcement in the Deccan and the terms were modified.

Several standing deductions cut into the sanctioned claim. The largest was a levy of a quarter of the total salary imposed on Deccani officers, established under Shah Jahan and continued by Aurangzeb. The khurak-i dawwab, or fodder charge, originated in an obligation to maintain and feed imperial elephants, horses, camels and carts, the number regulated by the holder's zat rank; the state later moved the animals into its own stables and simply charged the nobles for their feed, which by Shah Jahan's time was deducted from the salary claim. Irvine traced the charge to Akbar's practice of putting groups of baggage elephants in the care of grandees, observing that the officer came in the end to bear the charge while getting no use of the animals at all. Under Aurangzeb jagirs were assigned for the full salary and the charge then exacted separately through imperial messengers, a practice much resented; in his forty-sixth regnal year the emperor agreed to abolish it in respect of elephants. A near-contemporary complaint records mansabdars long reduced to wanting their evening meal, because assignments out of the reserve were so poor that a jagir's whole income might not cover what was required for the emperor's animals. Smaller deductions included a five per cent charge on cash payments by which the state recovered minting costs, and a coinage discount. Payments in kind were valued and set against salary, and fines were levied besides, mostly for deficiencies in the contingent. Against all this the mansabdar drew his troopers' pay and was entitled to retain five per cent of it for himself.

Arrears were chronic. Irvine judged that pay was behind even in the best times, both from the treasury to the mansabdars and from the mansabdars to their soldiers. Athar Ali records great nobles admitting arrears of five and six months to their troopers, Manucci reported that soldiers received only six or eight months' pay for a year's service, part of it in cast-off clothing, a ratio Gommans treats as common practice.

=== Watan jagir and escheat ===
One class of assignment stood outside the rule of transfer. The watan jagir denoted ancestral holdings assigned in jagir to Rajput officers of the empire, and it was reckoned against the holder's salary claim, as when Rawal Kalyan of Jaisalmer, given a mansab of 2,000 zat and 1,000 sawar, had that province assigned to him as pay. With autonomous chiefs the practice was to assess a territory's revenue at some figure and then grant its ruler ranks whose sanctioned pay equalled it. Such holdings were treated with unusual tenderness: when Raja Karan of Bikaner was pardoned in Aurangzeb's forty-third regnal year he received a mansab and his watan jagir was left untouched.

At the other end of a career stood escheat. Mughal custom was to list carefully the goods left by a noble at his death and, once the state's dues had been met, to distribute the remainder among his heirs at the emperor's discretion. The most striking instance is the death of Ali Mardan Khan in 1657, when property worth a crore of rupees was seized and Shah Jahan distributed only part of it among the sons and daughters, the rest going to the treasury in complete disregard of Muslim inheritance law. Aurangzeb's farman of 1666 instructed provincial diwans that a servant dying without heirs and without dues to the state should have his property deposited in the treasury of the community, and that where dues existed they were to be realised first. In practice the rule was applied case by case, and outright confiscation continued. Athar Ali declines to treat Aurangzeb as a reformer who liberated the nobility from escheat, arguing that the burden had been light even before him and amounted in practice only to the state's first claim on a dead officer's estate. Richards nonetheless counts escheat, alongside plunder and ceremonial gifts, as a substantial if irregular source of central-treasury income.

=== The fiscal weight of the system ===
The revenues not assigned to mansabdars formed the khalisa, with unassigned land held in reserve termed paibaqi. Richards stresses that the khalisa was a fiscal device rather than a demarcated block of land lying near the capital, a reserved pool of revenue out of which the emperor met the central household, the military and diplomatic establishments and the cash salaries of lesser mansabdars. Its share moved sharply over time: about a quarter of the assessed revenue of Delhi, Awadh and Allahabad in Akbar's thirty-first year, below five per cent of the empire's jama under Jahangir, and deliberately expanded again by Shah Jahan, fluctuating overall between five and twenty-five per cent, with the balance going to the mansabdars.

The resulting charge on the state was extraordinary. Richards, reconstructing the position in 1595–96, sets an effective jama of 3,960.3 million dams against a mansabdari total of 3,237.8 million, or roughly Rs 81 million out of Rs 99 million. Gommans puts the same figure at 80 per cent of all revenue, the zat accounting for 30 per cent of it and the sawar ranks for the remaining 50. Princely holdings account for a large part of the top of that distribution. Faruqui calculates that Prince Khurram, holding a sawar rank of 5,000 in 1607, could expect roughly Rs 100,000 a month, and that a decade later his entitlement may have exceeded eight million rupees a year, more than the combined tax revenues of Balkh, Badakhshan, Bukhara and Samarkand in the 1640s.

== Military obligations ==
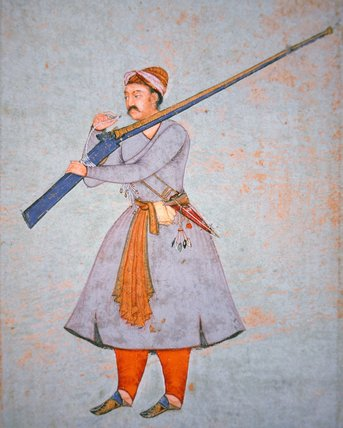
A Mughal officer of about 1585. The sawar rank measured how many equipped horsemen like this a mansabdar had to produce at muster.

=== Contingents ===
The sawar half of a mansab specified the horsemen its holder was to recruit, pay and produce at muster, and under Akbar he was expected to bring a number equal to the rank, being penalised for any shortfall. These men, the tabinan, made up the greater part of the army. Most of the heavy cavalry that formed the main striking arm of Mughal forces was raised, trained and equipped by the nobles themselves, each contingent built around a core of kinsmen, an arrangement Streusand characterises as a series of private armies that their commanders were paid to maintain for imperial service. The structure nested: lower-ranking mansabdars could themselves serve within the contingents of higher ones, a commander of 7,000 having men of up to 700 under him. Infantry and artillery lay outside the arrangement. They belonged to the household army and were, in Gommans's phrase, irrelevant to a system aimed at cavalry, and mansabdars were not obliged to provide guns, any artillery attached to a noble's contingent being in the charge of men whom the emperor himself appointed and paid.

A second obligation attached to the zat rank rather than the sawar, the prescribed stable and transport train against which a fixed allowance was paid. The Ain tabulates the establishment rank by rank, with maintenance rates graded by animal, from 1,100 dams a month for a first-class elephant down to 240 for a camel or mule. Mansabdars also kept an ancillary establishment of farriers, forges and surgeons scaled to rank, a holder of 4,000 maintaining eight farriers, two forges and two surgeons.

=== Horses ===
Quality of mounts was regulated as closely as number. Cavalry horses had to be the larger Central Asian or Persian breeds rather than the ordinary mounts of the subcontinent, and a specified proportion of troopers had to bring an additional horse as a remount. Gommans notes that although most horses came from Central Asia the Mughals could not dispense with Indian breeds from Sind and the Punjab, and that Akbar raised quality by paying dealers high prices and offering premiums on the allowances for foreign horses. Irvine counts seven classes of horse founded on breed, and records that under Aurangzeb officers of different ranks had to present a fixed mix at branding, a holder of 400 bringing three Iraqi, one mujannas and one Turki.

The ratio of horses to men was itself prescribed. When the Ain was drawn up, the standard body of ten troopers was made up of three three-horse men, four two-horse men and three one-horse men, so that ten riders brought twenty horses between them; an earlier formula had required twenty-five, and at the beginning of Akbar's reign mansabdars had been asked for four-horse men. Bernier reported that pay was proportioned to the number of horses rather than of men, two being generally allowed to each trooper. Elephants, Irvine notes, served display more than battle, chiefly carrying generals and great nobles.

=== Muster and verification ===
Verification rested on the paired devices of the descriptive roll and the brand. The roll was kept for all cavalry and not only for mansabdars' men. Horses had rolls of their own, classified under twenty principal colour divisions subdivided into fifty-eight categories in all. Once certified the roll was countersigned by the news-writer, the officer of muster and the commander of the guards, after which the superintendent of the brand marked the horses. The two brands, imperial and noble, kept animals from being shifted between contingents. Akbar allotted separate weekdays to the different musters, horses on Sunday and soldiers on Tuesday.

Enforcement ran through the pay chain. The mir bakhshi headed the military department and was responsible for inspecting mansabdars, troopers, mounts and equipment, his certification being required before pay could be released. Muster cycles varied: clerks and close servants paid in cash brought their horses every eighteen months, while grandees with very remote jagirs might not muster for twelve years. A mansabdar who let the verification period lapse lost the whole of his pay since the last verification, though a man known to the emperor personally might obtain relief, and under Aurangzeb one who still failed to secure the renewal certificate had all salary beyond eight months withheld. The obligation was not applied uniformly: branding was not enforced on mansabdars of 5,000 zat and above, and exemptions were granted for operational reasons, as in 1685 when Aurangzeb freed officers of 100 to 400 at court from the brand so that they could buy horses to replenish the cavalry.

=== Reductions of the obligation ===
From Shah Jahan's reign the obligation was formally set below the nominal rank: a third of the sawar rank where the holder's jagir lay in the province he served, so that an officer of 3,000/3,000 produced a thousand; a quarter elsewhere in Hindustan, and a fifth on distant expeditions such as that to Balkh and Badakhshan or when paid in cash. Because jagirs of different month-ratios yielded very different real incomes, the obligation was laid down separately for each ratio, and Blochmann, translating the Shah Jahan-era regulation from the Padishahnama, reports that the tables fixed not only numbers but the mix of multi-horse men, a rank of 1,000 sawar on a seven-month assignment producing 250 two-horse and 750 one-horse troopers, and on a five-month assignment only one-horse men. Individual ratios were negotiable: Aurangzeb reduced one officer's obligation from a quarter to a fifth.

Proportion of the sawar rank to be produced at muster under Shah Jahan
Circumstance	Fraction required
Serving in the province where the holder's jagir lay	one-third
Serving elsewhere in Hindustan	one-fourth
Distant campaigns, such as Balkh and Badakhshan	one-fifth
Paid in cash rather than by jagir	one-fifth

=== Other categories of troops ===
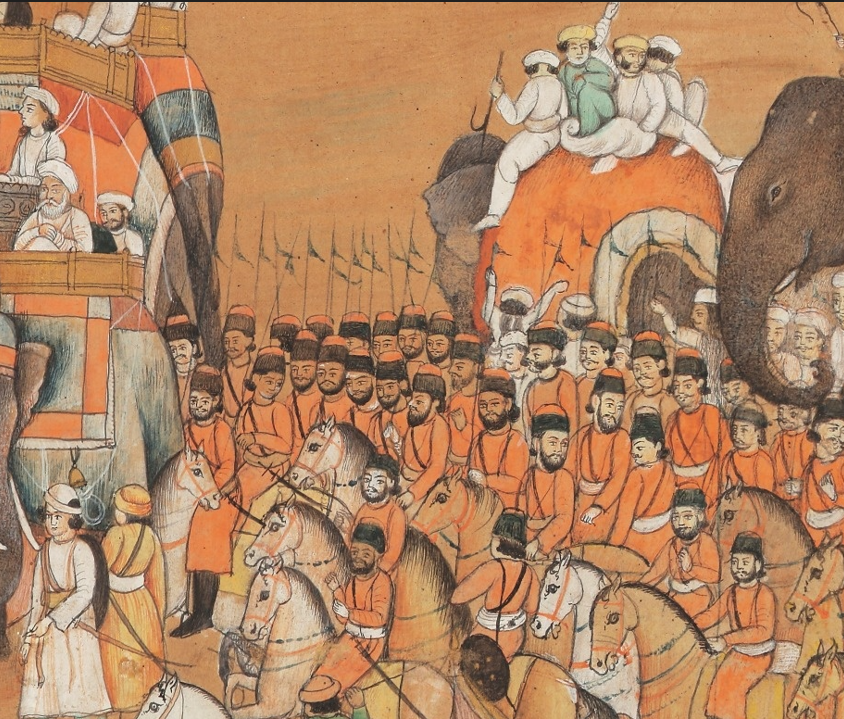
Cavalry in a Mughal procession. Contingents raised by mansabdars made up the greater part of the army.

Alongside the mansabdars' contingents stood bodies recruited and paid directly by the crown. The ahadis were single troopers under no one's command, and Blake explains that because they had no mounted following of their own they could not be given mansabdari rank, being instead kept near the emperor. Each bought his own horse, brought all his mounts to every muster, and some drew more than Rs 500 a month. They had a separate establishment with their own diwan and bakhshi under one of the great amirs, and numbered some 7,000 at the end of Akbar's twentieth regnal year. Blake reckons roughly 2,000 in the palace-fortress of Shahjahanabad about 1650, alongside some 10,000 attendants who were neither mansabdars nor cavalrymen, and records Aurangzeb keeping 10,000 cavalry in his bodyguard in 1681. The dakhili foot were paid by the state but handed over to the umara and classed, though infantry, as half-cavalry. Iqtidar Alam Khan holds that officers were from the outset allowed such foot soldiers equal to half the horsemen brought to muster, a quarter of them musketeers, and estimates about 35,000 musketeers in the Mughal army in 1595–96.

Who a mansabdar could enlist was also conventionally regulated. Khushhal Chand records customary rules keyed to the noble's own origin, a commander from Transoxiana recruiting only Mughals while one from Iran might take a third Mughals and the rest Sayyids and Shaikhs, and the Mirat-i Ahmadi prescribes mounted followers one-third Mughal, one-third Afghan and one-third Rajput. Satish Chandra reads this as Akbar extending his principle of ethnic balance into the contingents themselves, as tribal and clan levies gave way to mixed bodies. Richards nonetheless stresses that in practice nothing stopped a mansabdar from enlisting men who shared his own ethnic origin and faith, and a mansabdar's son was frequently enrolled in his father's contingent before receiving a modest rank of his own.

=== Paper strength and real strength ===
That contingents fell short of their nominal size was recognised throughout. Abu'l-Fazl records that at musters held before the emperor men were found to have been hired for the day with even their clothes and saddles borrowed, and were weighed with hands and feet tied to expose the fraud. Manucci reported that mansabdars kept fifty to two hundred horses in their stables for show and on review day mounted their servants on them to pass them off as soldiers. Mughal writers marked the gap in their own vocabulary, distinguishing what was actually present from what stood merely on paper. Athar Ali notes that officers in the Deccan found it very difficult to keep full contingents and were consequently not militarily superior to their opponents, and cites the statement that towards the close of Aurangzeb's reign only three Rajput chiefs among all the imperial officers kept up their requisite contingents. Richards observes that by the Deccan wars many mansabdars routinely shirked, keeping troops locked in forts rather than facing Maratha raiders. Streusand draws the structural conclusion: the steady loosening of the regulations shows that mansabdars frequently disregarded them and were rarely punished, and the divergence between regulation and practice formed one of the foundations of what he calls the Mughal political compromise.

Estimating the resulting army is therefore difficult, and the figures in the literature vary widely. Iqtidar Alam Khan takes the aggregate of sawar ranks in 1595–96, 188,070, as approximating the horsemen actually brought to muster. Irvine tabulated the competing estimates by period, running from 12,000 cavalry under the early Akbar to between 200,000 and 300,000 under Shah Jahan, Aurangzeb and Muhammad Shah. Gommans estimates that the bulk of the army lay with a few hundred great mansabdars, whose mounted retainers numbered somewhere between 100,000 and 200,000, while only a few thousand household troops stood under the emperor's direct command, and cautions that the Ain's figure of over four million men with a military qualification describes local militia rather than troops enlisted by mansabdars. His wider point is that the Mughal state faced a supply of warriors so large that mustering men was never the difficulty; controlling them was.

== The nobility ==
The system was the mechanism by which the Mughal Empire recruited, ranked and retired its ruling elite, and the composition of that elite is described here only so far as the system selected for it. Mansabs were held by 1,823 men in 1595, who between them commanded a minimum of 141,053 troopers.

=== Recruitment and appointment ===
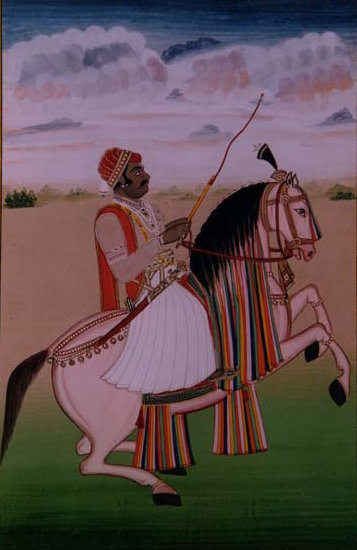
Man Singh I, who reached 7,000 zat and 6,000 sawar, among the highest ranks granted to anyone outside the imperial family.

Blake describes the practical route in: an aspiring commander needed a patron, a blood relative or fellow member of his tribe, caste or ethnic group, who introduced him to the mir bakhshi, the paymaster general, after which he was inspected for arms and mounts.

Entry also required capital. Gommans stresses that a candidate needed money for enrolment and equipment, borrowed from a patron or a moneylender if he could not supply it himself, which made a mansab resemble an investment. Every candidate had to furnish a surety, zamin, a requirement so rigorously applied that Manucci reported even princes conformed to it, although Deccani recruits under Aurangzeb were exempted from it. Appointment rested formally with the emperor but in practice on a recommendation, tajwiz, from the prince, commander or governor under whom the man served, the same procedure that later governed promotion.

=== Ethnic and religious composition ===
Richards, using Iqtidar Alam Khan's data, gives a snapshot for 1580: the imperial elite had grown six-fold in twenty-five years to 222 amirs, comprising 47 Persians, 48 Chaghatai and Uzbek Turanis, 44 indigenous Indian Muslims (16 per cent), and 43 Rajputs and other Hindus. Moreland, working from Abul Fazl's mansab lists, put the proportion of foreigners among the nobles listed in the Ain whose origin is known at slightly less than 70 per cent. By Aurangzeb's reign the share had fallen to about half: of 417 mansabdars of 1,000 zat and above in 1658 to 1678 whose origin can be determined, 202 were foreign. Athar Ali attributes the change to circumstance rather than policy, the Uzbek and Safavid kingdoms no longer sending the same flow of experienced nobles, and insists there is no evidence that Aurangzeb consciously set out to Indianise the nobility. Gommans qualifies the category itself, noting that more and more of those counted as foreign had in fact been born in India, it being their parents or grandparents who had immigrated.

Although the ruling family was of Turani origin, Turanis, whom Athar Ali defines as Central Asians from the Turkish-speaking lands, were not the dominant foreign group: they numbered 67 of the 486 mansabdars of 1,000 and above in 1658 to 1678, or 13.7 per cent, and fell further in 1679 to 1707. Iranis, the Persian-speaking peoples from Herat to Baghdad, numbered 136 of the same 486, which Athar Ali offers as statistical confirmation of Bernier's remark that the greater part of the foreign nobility were Persians. Indian Muslims, popularly known as Shaikhzadas, belonged largely to clans such as the Saiyids of Barha and the Kambus; they numbered 65 of 486 (13.4 per cent) in 1658 to 1678 and 69 of 575 in 1679 to 1707, while Afghans at 5,000 zat and above rose from three to ten across the same periods.

The Rajput opening began in 1561 to 1562, when Bharamall, the Kachhwaha raja of Amber, sought Akbar's protection against a hostile Mughal governor and offered a daughter in marriage; Akbar accepted him, his son and his grandson as amirs, and the raja retained his seat. Akbar generally recruited clan heads claiming royal blood, thakurs, rather than more obscure warriors, each raja receiving high rank and pay with lesser mansabs for his kinsmen. Richards reads the arrangement ideologically, arguing that in accepting service the thakurs accepted Akbar as a Muslim Rajput of greater sovereignty than any of their own chiefs. The Rajput share of nobles of 1,000 zat and above later fell from 18.7 per cent under Shah Jahan to 14.6 per cent in 1658 to 1678 and 12.6 per cent (73 of 575) in 1679 to 1707, but Athar Ali argues the decline is an artefact of the Deccani influx, since measured against non-Deccani nobles alone the Rajput share rose from 16.6 to 17.6 per cent.

That influx was the largest change the system ever registered, and it told most heavily at the top of the hierarchy. When Bijapur and Golconda fell, Richards records, Aurangzeb took 64 of their Muslim nobles into imperial service at high amir rank, 32 of them at 5,000 zat or more, and despite their competence they met considerable resentment. Marathas were enrolled mostly below 3,000 zat and almost all employed as auxiliary field commanders of doubtful reliability; Richards argues that Aurangzeb could devise no Maratha policy analogous to Akbar's Rajput policy, since neither his personality nor his reputation for piety lent itself to a warm welcome and few Maratha commanders could communicate freely in Persian. Athar Ali is blunter, holding that since no military decision could be won in the war with the Marathas, the practice of buying off the Deccanis went on until it played havoc with the historic composition of the nobility.

Religious composition followed from these movements rather than from doctrine. Athar Ali's comparison across four benchmarks gives 22 Hindus of 98 mansabdars in 1595, 98 of 437 under Shah Jahan, 105 of 486 in 1658 to 1678 and 182 of 575 in 1679 to 1707, with the Hindu share of the top bracket running 14.3, 24.5, 19.6 and 32.9 per cent. He concedes that these tables give "a fine lawyer's answer" to the charge that Aurangzeb discriminated against Hindu mansabdars, but insists the total is inflated by Marathas who were not recruited out of tolerance and had practically forced their way in. The Cambridge Economic History of India adds that, most Hindu mansabdars coming from established ruling orders, the higher imperial service was not genuinely open to the Hindu population at large.

=== Heredity and the khanazad ===
No mansab was formally inheritable, yet family claims ran through the system. Athar Ali's count of khanazads, men born into households already in imperial service, among Aurangzeb's mansabdars of 1,000 zat and above gives 213 of 486 (44 per cent) for 1658 to 1678 and 272 of 575 (47 per cent) for 1679 to 1707. He warns that the later proportion is "probably illusory": in the best-documented top bracket of 5,000 zat and above the khanazad share actually fell from 25 of 51 to 24 of 79, and chroniclers were in any case likelier to notice men descended from prominent nobles. Among the 179 great amirs of 1658 to 1678 the proportion was higher still at 57 per cent, yet Blake reads the remaining 43 per cent without hereditary connection as evidence that the system stayed relatively open, adding that even men who entered through family began well below their predecessors and rose on their own ability.

Richards treats khanazadgi as an ideology rather than a statistic: Rajputs, Turanis, Iranis, Indian Muslims and some Afghan amirs all called themselves khanazads, regarding Mughal service and preference within it as their prerogative. A noble's sons inherited neither his rank nor his titles, and no more than a share of what he left, though they were marked out for rapid advancement. A contemporary writer complained that in Aurangzeb's later years a flood of fresh appointees, Deccanis above all, was displacing the khanazads, and Alam notes that in the early eighteenth century the word hardened into a factional label set against jadid, new. Athar Ali's verdict is that the Mughals had no adequate machinery for admitting men on the basis of talent, and that family and clan were too often decisive. Chandra takes the opposite emphasis, allowing that the nobility was self-perpetuating to a degree but arguing that it was no closed corporation, since merit and learning counted for more than birth and entrants generally worked up from the lower grades.

=== Promotion, transfer and demotion ===
Promotion followed the same route as a first grant and was customarily awarded at festivals, at the start of the regnal year, on the emperor's birthday, and at the beginning or end of a campaign; increases were given for gallantry and merit but also, at the other end of the scale, on receipt of a handsome present, peshkash. The size of an increase was normally proportionate to the rank already held, and as a rule an addition of more than 50 per cent was not granted. Those whose contingents fell short were punished by demotion or fines. A high officer transferred from one post to another presented himself at court before taking up the new appointment, unless the transfer was punitive, in which case he was not permitted to come.

Death terminated the claim, and the estate then fell under the rule of escheat. Renewal came through succession struggles, which Faruqui frames as the empire's mechanism of elite replenishment, a new emperor's courtiers being largely his own former princely retainers. Streusand notes that, unlike Ottoman and Safavid rulers, Mughal emperors rarely executed, demoted or even reprimanded their officers. The Mughal political compromise, he argues, gave an officer secure status and secure income, a chance of rising higher, and reasonable odds that his son would inherit his position and establishment; Mughal decline, narrowly defined, was its failure.

== Administration ==
Ibn Hasan presents the central establishment as the product of Akbar's decision to break up the authority of a single all-powerful vizier and to share it between four ministers of equal standing, the diwan or finance minister, the mir bakhshi or paymaster and muster-master of the army, the mir saman or household steward, and the sadr or minister for religious patronage, so that none could dominate the others. Richards treats Akbar's willingness to let the vakil, formally the highest office in the empire, lapse into disuse as the first critical step in concentrating executive power in the emperor's own hands.

=== The bakhshi establishment ===
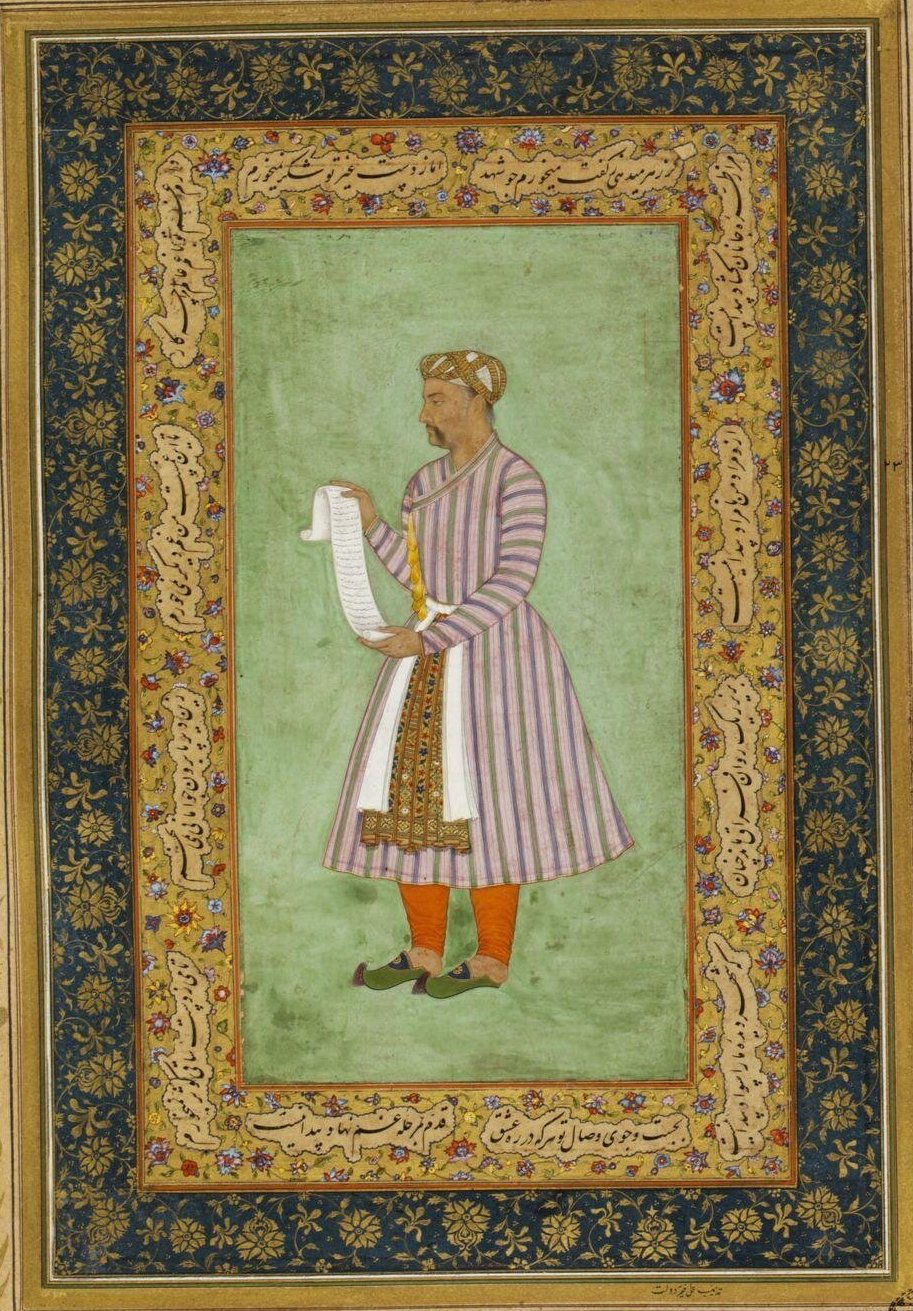
Shaikh Farid Bukhari as mir bakhshi, the officer who granted ranks, ran the musters and certified pay.

Jadunath Sarkar classed the bakhshi's establishment as one of the empire's principal departments, the military pay and accounts office. Ibn Hasan holds that the mir bakhshi inherited the powers of the older Delhi Sultanate diwan-i arz or review office, and that his place beside the throne in open court carried his influence well beyond his own department and made him an equal sharer of the wazir's responsibilities; he ranked it second in status only to the chief diwan, as Abu'l-Fazl had done. It was not a command. Richards observes that Akbar reserved strategy and the naming of field commanders to himself, leaving the bakhshi with recruitment, rank recommendations and the fixing of pay, and the bakhshi was paymaster in the literal sense only while an army was in the field, handing his accounts to the diwan's office on its return.

By Shah Jahan's reign the number of bakhshis in the central office was fixed at three, the designations first, second and third dating from that reign. Work was divided by the standing of the clientele, the chief taking princes and high amirs, the second the lower-ranking mansabdars, and the third not mansabdars at all but only daily-wage men. Richards notes that the division of functions was duplicated in each province, each principal officer reporting to a different element of the centre and the provincial bakhshi to the mir bakhshi. Saran summarises the provincial bakhshi's work as enlistment, mustering, the passing of pay bills and enforcement of the branding regulations, and Irvine adds that such officers normally also held the post of waqia-nigar, writer of the official diary.

=== Appointment procedure ===
In theory a candidate appeared in person before the emperor, whose glance was held sufficient to gauge a man's worth. Richards places the imperial bakhshi in open court at the emperor's right hand, personally presenting every candidate for appointment or promotion.

The paper chain that followed was long. Irvine, working from a dastur-ul-amal or manual of procedure, describes the bakhshi laying a written statement (haqiqat) before the emperor, who wrote his order across the paper directing the man to appear; the final order passed at his obeisance in the audience hall days later. A rough estimate or siyaha daul drawn up by the chief clerk of the diwan-i tan set out the zat and sawar ranks, the pay in dams and the parganas from which it was to be drawn; the diary-writer then entered it and extracted a memorandum (yad-dasht) for the office of confirmation. Ibn Hasan gives the same sequence in three named stages, the approved yad-dasht becoming a ta'liqa once the chief minister had passed it, and the ta'liqa being retained by the bakhshi, who issued a sarkhat or certificate in its place. That certificate went, signed by the other bakhshis, to the diwan, who computed the salary due and referred the case to the emperor. Only after this second submission was the formal appointment order drawn up, needing the seals of several officers and issuing under the seal of the wazir.

=== Records ===
Ibn Hasan enumerates ten classes of record kept in the mir bakhshi's office, among them lists of mansabdars at the capital and in the provinces, the dastur-ul-amal regulations governing cash and jagir salaries, a list of ranks and of the salaries drawn against them, the descriptive rolls (chehra) of mansabdars and their troopers, and records of branding and verification. The office also issued warrants under the bakhshi's own seal for grants of mansabs and increments, the branding of horses, musters and the posting of mansabdars and provincial bakhshis.

Richards notes that orders of appointment and transfer were prepared and recorded there over the bakhshi's ink-stamp imprint before the emperor signed them. Sarkar characterised the resulting state as a kaghazi raj, a government of paper.

=== Offices and postings ===
A mansab was a standing rather than a job. Athar Ali draws out the consequence: once a man had accepted a rank he placed his whole service at the emperor's disposal and could be given any duty in any department, no separate salary attaching to the office, his mansab pay covering everything asked of him; failure in a charge was punished by reduction of rank and not by the loss of an office allowance. Where a posting required more troopers than the holder's sawar rank provided, the difference was met by the conditional mashrut increment described above, surrendered with the office. Ali nonetheless found that canons of correspondence between post and rank developed in practice, governors, faujdars and thanadars being drawn from defined bands of rank and the highest provincial charges reserved to nobles of 2,500 to 7,000 zat. His summing up is that the organisation embraced the military, civil and financial services alike and that mansab and post, though formally unrelated, corresponded broadly, judicial office alone lying outside the arrangement.

The charges ran from the province downwards, from the nazim or subahdar who governed a suba to the faujdar and the thanadar below him. Saran, following the Mirat-i Ahmadi, notes that governors were appointed by farman and other officers by sanad, that of a provincial bakhshi issuing through the imperial bakhshi's office under his seal. Fiscal charge was kept deliberately clear of the governor. Saran records that the provincial diwan owed his selection and his commission to the imperial diwan rather than to the province, and stood outside the governor's authority altogether, and that Akbar ordered in 1596 that every provincial diwan report his proceedings to the emperor. Collection on the ground was not a mansabdar's work but an assignee's: Habib describes the amil, also called shiqdar and often doubling as amin and treasurer, whom Aurangzeb required jagirdars to send in person rather than farm the collection out. At the centre the great offices were themselves appointments laid over a mansab. Ibn Hasan lists those needing the emperor's own seal as the office of vakil, the vizarat, the sadarat, a governorship and the post of bakhshi, alongside the grant of a mansab itself, and records that orders of appointment to mansabs of every rank and to those great offices alike passed through the chief bakhshi.

Few men stayed long in one place. Every mansabdar was carried on one of two lists, hazir-i rikab for those in attendance at court and ta'inati for those on duty in the provinces, and Irvine records that officers moved frequently between them. Quitting a charge was a matter for the bakhshi and not for the holder: Saran notes that a mansabdar who left his post without taking leave was formally entered as a runaway. Nor did every charge go to a noble. Richards observes that provincial bakhshis were higher-ranked officers though not nobles, deficiencies found at their inspections being met by deductions of pay, or, for jagirdars, by claims the provincial diwan lodged against them.

== Later development ==
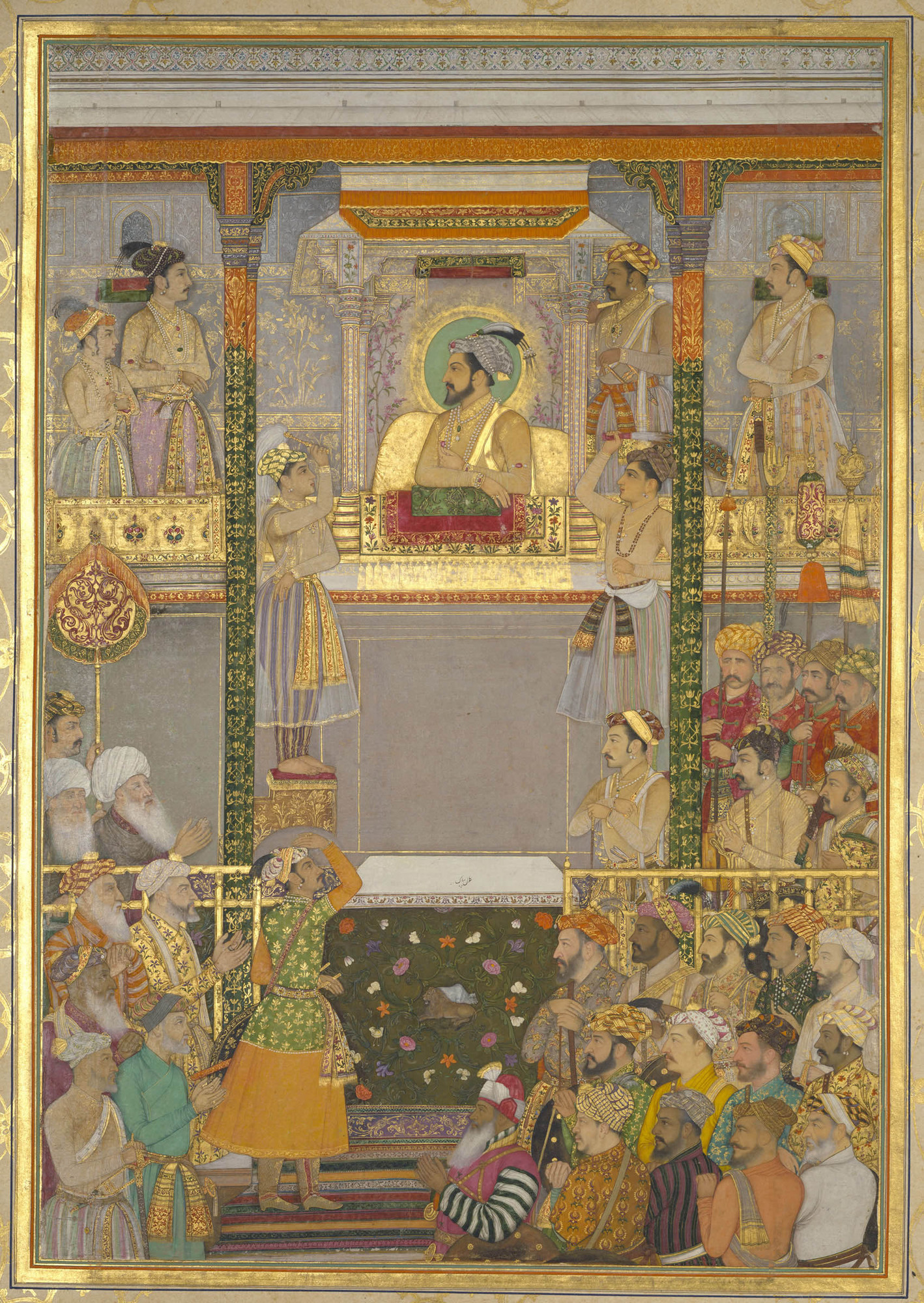
The court of Shah Jahan, in whose reign the muster obligation was formally cut to a third, a quarter or a fifth of nominal rank.

=== Jahangir and Shah Jahan ===
The one substantial structural innovation of Jahangir's reign was the du-aspa sih-aspa rank described above. Abdul Aziz notes that the first grant of it, to Mahabat Khan, was withdrawn when the command disappointed, the extra salary being recovered from his jagir, and found the distinction a rare honour under Jahangir that became common only under Shah Jahan.

The numbers themselves grew. Blochmann, comparing De Laet's list with the Ain and the Padshahnama, found commanders of 500 zat and above rising from 249 under Akbar to 439 under Jahangir and 563 under Shah Jahan, and those of 1,000 zat from 31 to 97. Aziz cautions that De Laet's list, the only one purporting to catch the rank-holders alive at a single moment, belongs to the end of Akbar's reign or the beginning of Jahangir's rather than to Jahangir's reign proper. Faruqui cites a contemporary witticism that khanship had become cheap as evidence of resentment at the dilution of rank. Athar Ali accepts that control over the contingents actually maintained slackened in these years, but stresses that there is no positive proof of it.

Shah Jahan reorganised the system on a new basis, enforcing Akbar's rules with modifications and giving formal status to the much reduced size of noble contingents by fixing the muster obligation at a set fraction of the sawar rank. Irvine adds that verification was held in three fixed annual seasons. Aziz records a doubt he shared with Moreland over whether the rule was Shah Jahan's at all, turning on the sense of Lahori's word daulat. The lowest fraction was later extended to mansabdars paid in cash (naqdi) and then to all those posted to Kabul.

Because the Mughal Deccan's real yield was about a quarter of its assessment, most Deccan jagirs stood at four months or less, and transfer southward meant a drop in scale. Moreland had shown that pay rates for both zat and sawar ranks were progressively cut between Akbar's time and Shah Jahan's, a finding Athar Ali reports as corroborated by documents Moreland had not seen. Gommans adds that commissariat charges once borne by the court, transport animals and fodder, were passed to mansabdars by lowering the barawurdi scales.

Richards frames the muster reductions as a response to those falling scales, and denies that the army was weakened in absolute terms, Lahori's 200,000 armed horsemen exceeding the 147,000 of Akbar's day. He also counts the imperial cadre nearly doubling from 283 officers at the end of Akbar's reign to 445 in 1647 even after adjusting for rank inflation, and finds the seventy-three nobles of 2,500 zat and above taking 37.6 per cent of the empire's assessed revenue. Blake reports the top 445 mansabdars receiving 61 per cent of total revenues out of some 8,000 mansabdars in 1650.

=== Aurangzeb and the Deccan ===
Absorption of southern nobles began before Aurangzeb, Richards noting that many Ahmadnagar noblemen and a few Maratha captains entered Mughal service on that kingdom's annexation. The scale changed with the Deccan wars. Gommans dates the fall of Bijapur to 1686 and Golconda to 1687, after which Aurangzeb remained in the south for the rest of his life, and Satish Chandra reckons he spent his last twenty-six years there for limited returns. Athar Ali locates the real expansion of the mansabdar corps in precisely those years, attributing it to the recruitment of Deccani and Maratha nobles, many promoted not for service but as a bribe for desertion.

The statistical series are uneven but agree in direction. Athar Ali's tables put Deccanis, Marathas included, at 58 of 486 mansabdars of 1,000 zat and above (11.8 per cent) in 1658 to 1678, rising to 160 of 575 (27.6 per cent) in 1679 to 1707, their share at 5,000 zat and above jumping from 19.6 to 60.8 per cent. Gommans counts about sixty Muslim warlords from the Deccan and almost a hundred Maratha chiefs enrolled mainly in the lower ranks, the Maratha share of all mansabdars rising from 5.5 to roughly 16.7 per cent. Growth was not uniform: net grants of 89,000 zat in the first two regnal years were followed by a check from the third to the tenth, with several years of net negative grants.

What made these totals critical was the pool of assignable land. The paibaqi, the reserve earmarked for reassignment, was administratively part of the khalisa but kept as a separate charge under the central Diwan-i Khalisa. Athar Ali records Aurangzeb writing to Prince A'zam that "there is shortage of paibaqi and surfeit of claimants for pay", and forbidding the bakhshis in 1691 to recommend new men for mansabs. Habib, quoting Ma'muri and Khafi Khan, finds large numbers becoming jagirless (be-jagir), and identifies the small mansabdars, lacking money and influence alike, as the real victims. Ali reports waits of four or five years and a saying that a boy mansabdar would have grown a white beard before he got his jagir, allocation turning on a patron, an energetic agent and the means for large bribes. Faruqui, reading the akhbarat, finds nobles unable either to obtain a jagir or to draw enough from the one they held.

=== The jagirdari crisis ===
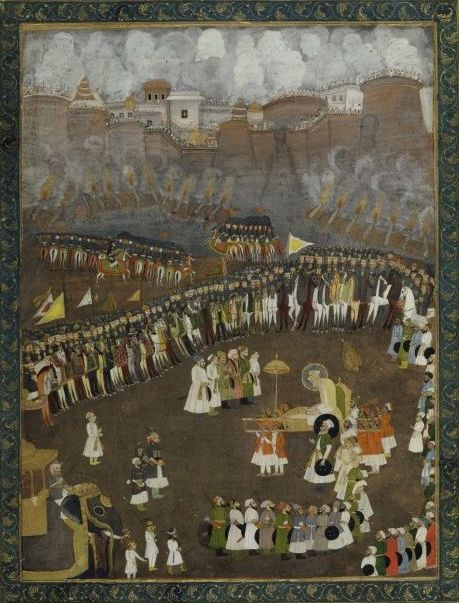
Aurangzeb at the siege of Satara. The Deccan wars absorbed new nobles faster than assignable revenue could be found for them.

Whether this distress amounted to a systemic crisis, and of what kind, is the central controversy of the subject. Satish Chandra argues that the crisis appeared outwardly as an administrative and economic breakdown but must be read against medieval Indian agrarian and social relations. He reads Shah Jahan's graduated muster rule and month-scales as an attempt to close the gap between assessed and realised revenue by cutting both the emoluments and the obligations of mansabdars, a remedy that set up a vicious circle, since fewer sawars meant less power to collect. Chandra dates the manifest onset to the middle of the seventeenth century and holds that the condition worsened until it foreshadowed complete breakdown or total reorganisation, concluding that by 1707 the whole mansabdari system was threatened with collapse.

Athar Ali's version is narrower. He holds that the machinery worked tolerably until Aurangzeb's last years, when the dislocation of resources and the complicated procedure of assignment lost efficiency, and treats that failure as the beginning of the end. Irfan Habib ties the crisis directly to the influx of Deccani and Maratha mansabdars whose numbers made existing jagirs insufficient. He set the crisis within his wider agrarian thesis that short tenure drove the revenue demand upward until peasants fled and squeezed zamindars revolted. Alam identifies this as the seminal Aligarh treatment. Ali qualifies the oppression thesis by asking whether jagirdars could act against the emperor's wishes, holding imperial control to have been real for most of the reign.

Richards dissents on the mechanism. He concedes that claimants came to exceed the paibaqi pool but attributes this to a deliberate policy favouring the central treasury, most Hyderabad lands being kept in khalisa, while allowing that the shortfall was more than artificial, since raiding and reprisal drove peasants off the land and Mughal officers clashed over the tracts that still paid. Gommans records that Athar Ali published a criticism of Richards in the introduction to the reprinted Mughal Nobility. Streusand restates the mainstream position as a supply-side crisis, conquest by inducement meaning that the rewards offered in Bijapur, Golconda and the Maratha war outstripped the revenue the new regions yielded, against Richards' counter that the revenue was there but the ties with indigenous elites needed to reach it were not.

Streusand's own judgement is that the crisis must have had both supply and demand aspects, and he faults Richards for omitting the destructive effect of the campaigns on the regions concerned. Muzaffar Alam credits Chandra with drawing on new archival material to demolish the received view of the Deccan as a region running a deficit, and with separating be-jagiri from a crisis in the jagirdari system proper, which Chandra located in the system's non-functionality rather than in the growth of the ruling class against a shrinking pool. Alam's own emphasis is that jagirdars' military power had already declined through the seventeenth-century reforms, so that as local intermediaries grew stronger the jagirdars needed central help exactly when the centre was absorbed elsewhere.

The consequences outlasted Aurangzeb. Richards holds that the shortage of productive jagirs did not abate after 1707, and that Bahadur Shah and Jahandar Shah, handing out inflated ranks in the wake of every political struggle, added to the demand on shrinking resources. Alam describes Punjab jagirdars farming their assignments to moneylenders, an index of the uncertainty that made a jagirdar surrender his cherished right of direct collection. Irvine notes that the precautions against false musters lapsed from the middle of Muhammad Shah's reign, branding having disappeared entirely from the suba of Ahmadabad by 1761. Faruqui judges the debate over causes not easily resolvable, while treating the hardship itself as documented beyond dispute.

== Decline and afterlife ==
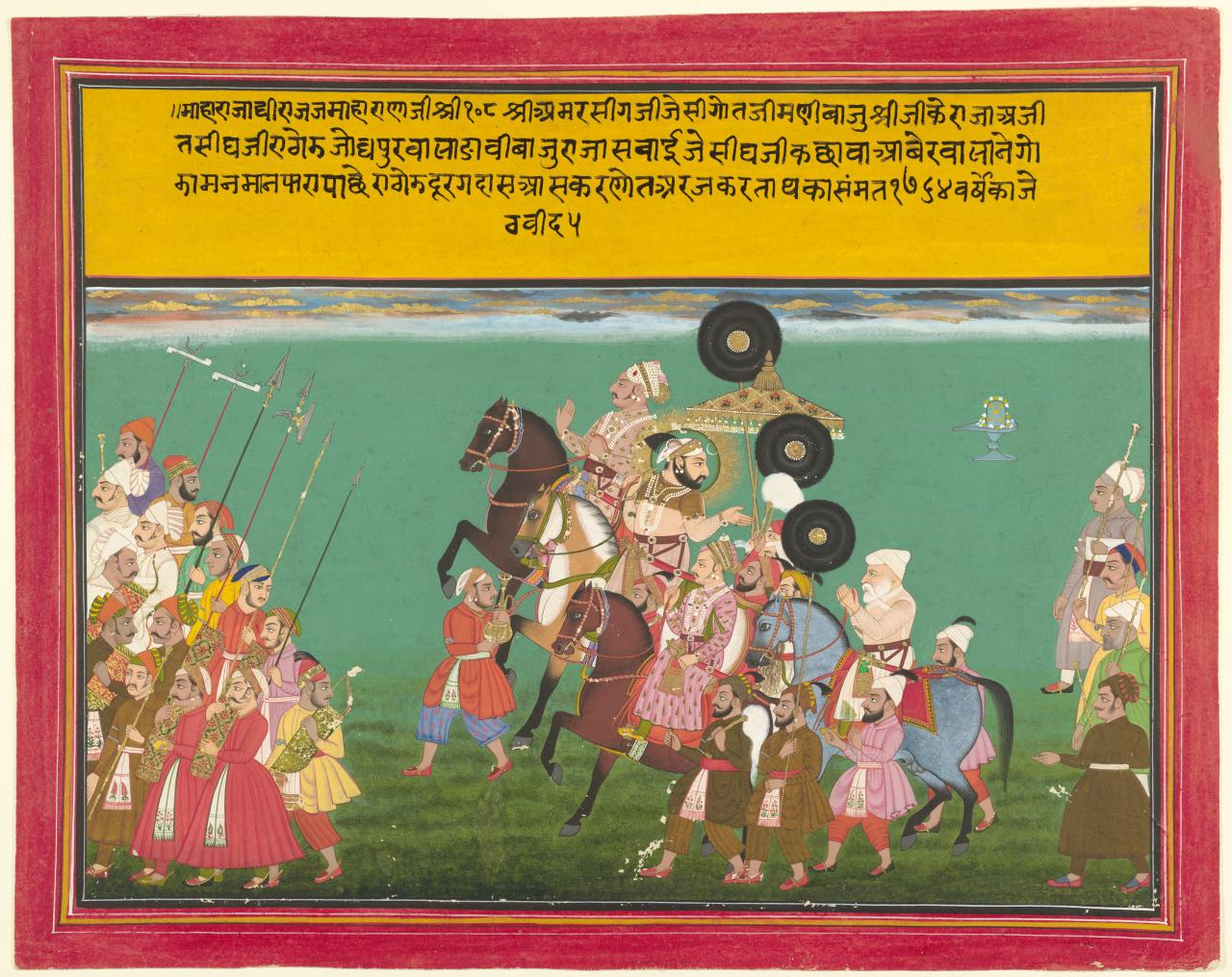
Rajput rulers whose watan holdings, exempt from the ordinary rule of transfer, outlasted the system that had ranked them.

=== The eighteenth century ===
Richards dates the break-up of the centralised structure to the four wars of succession fought between 1707 and 1720, after which the two institutions the imperial bureaucracy had managed, the zabt revenue assessment and the assignment of jagirs, degenerated into caricatures of themselves: assessment slid into tax farming and assigned jagirs rapidly became local fiefs. Satish Chandra charges Bahadur Shah with a reckless generosity in granting jagirs and increments that threatened either to make mansabs meaningless or to fritter away the khalisa (crown land), and holds that under Jahandar Shah the settled conventions of administration were abandoned altogether, khalisa lands themselves being commonly farmed out. Zulfiqar Khan's attempt to compel mansabdars to maintain their stipulated quotas and to enforce the muster regulations was resented, and his rules were soon abandoned in favour of granting ranks liberally to royal favourites.

The most consequential change was the decay of transfer. The Cambridge Economic History of India records that in the eighteenth century's second quarter almost every revenue-yielding tract stood assigned in jagir, and that frequent transfer yielded, for a while, to tenures that ran long and could even pass by inheritance, though those rights, unlike madad-i ma'ash charity grants, did not become alienable. Around mid-century the larger assignments turned hereditary, with sub-infeudation and revenue farming becoming the norm, while in the Mughal Deccan the jagirs had been growing hereditary since the century opened. Richards, quoting Satish Chandra, holds that the zamindars grew stronger as a class not because transfers were frequent but because periodic transfer decayed. Muzaffar Alam finds that holding a jagir in or near one's own homeland, and for a long and preferably lifelong term, became in sharp contrast to established Mughal practice a de facto part of jagir administration across almost the whole of north India, and treats such holdings as violations of the classical seventeenth-century conception of imperial authority which reinforced provincial autonomy.

Revenue farming spread with it. Ijara, the sale of the right of collection to a contractor, was disapproved of at the Mughal court, and Habib cites court news of Aurangzeb's reign reporting that mansabdars with jagirs in Kashmir were farming them out to oppressive local men; by Farrukhsiyar's reign, with bankers and speculators investing in it, the practice had become widespread. In eighteenth-century Awadh the jagirdar ordinarily preferred to farm out his jagir, his own collection agents came to be described as revenue-farming amils, and offices as senior as the faujdari and even the subadari were held on ijara against the guarantee of bankers.

=== Successor states ===
Alam frames the period as a rearrangement of the imperial frame rather than its disappearance, the new subadari, which some writers term the successor state, taking shape between about 1722 and 1748. By the eve of Nadir Shah's invasion, he argues, the institutions and norms regulating the Mughal system had almost totally collapsed, yet the semblance of the empire was preserved because it suited all the elements that had composed it, each new regional power seeking the hegemony of the centre for legitimacy against its neighbours, as the Benaras zamindari did in pressing for direct access to the emperor and the Farrukhabad Afghans in pursuing recognition from Delhi. Streusand states the bargain more bluntly: autonomous governorships satisfied officers' need for secure status and income at the price of reducing the Mughal court to purely symbolic significance.

What the provinces retained was the form. Alam shows that in Awadh the conferment of titles and mansabs, an imperial prerogative, was taken over by Safdar Jang: formal approval was still sought from Delhi, but the grants were made by the governor and imperial consent was merely confirmatory, adding grace and dignity to the act, and it was the governor's responsibility to provide the jagirs against those ranks. Irvine's material shows the mansab still functioning as a currency of recruitment in the later empire: under Muhammad Shah, Muhammad Khan Bangash filled his ranks by remitting money to his home country, and a man's rank followed from his reputation, his connections or the number of his followers. In the Maratha polity the vocabulary was borrowed outright, the residual three-quarters of the chauth being distributed to generals as mokasa or saranjam to maintain their forces, while after annexation the remaining revenue came to be called jagir and was recognised as the perquisite of the Maratha barons who had conquered the region.

The military substance did not survive the form. Blake places the practical extinction of the imperial military establishment around 1750: the imperial army was disbanded as the mansabdari system collapsed, and Shahjahanabad was left at the mercy of marauders and undisciplined armies. Emperors nonetheless remained on the throne until 1858 with few troops, little money and limited authority, keeping a symbolic importance because the successor states treated the emperor as a source of legitimacy whose sanction new rulers generally sought. Streusand emphasises that the Mughals, unlike every Muslim dynasty that had ruled the subcontinent before them, won a legitimacy durable enough to outlast their actual power. After obtaining the diwani in 1765 the East India Company gathered Mughal revenue records from local officials in order to understand the system before settling assessment terms with the zamindars. The Cambridge Economic History cautions against reading imperial decline as general economic decline, seeing little reason to think Awadh and the eastern subas worse off as virtually independent kingdoms.

== Comparative context ==
The comparison most often drawn is with the Ottoman timar. Streusand notes that Bernier identified the Mughal jagir with the timar and that Habib called the expression "a harmless Turkicism"; both were salary paid through an assignment of land revenue, distinct from a cash salary on one side and a feudal land grant on the other. Streusand insists that the resemblance is superficial. The Ottoman sipahi was a private soldier, usually with family roots in the province where he served and often keeping one and the same assignment throughout his career, whereas a mansabdar might command hundreds or thousands of retainers and normally changed assignment every few years. The Ottomans did not separate revenue assignment from administrative responsibility, which made the army of a province its government as well.

Two further contrasts follow. Nothing in the Mughal system corresponded to the kapikulu, the slave establishment recruited by the devshirme levy which supplied the Ottomans with administrators, ulama and soldiers. Ottoman officers, drawn in by that levy and schooled within the palace itself, shed their local identity and were mostly Turkish-speaking Muslims, while mansabdars retained ethnic and local identity, there was no religious or linguistic uniformity among them, and neither the Ottoman distinction between imperial servants and subjects nor the millet division had a Mughal parallel. Within the Ottoman government and ruling class, the Janissaries came to occupy a place of the first importance; Mughal infantry, Streusand observes, had no political weight whatever.

Safavid practice differed again. The provinces were essentially the land-revenue assignments (tiyul) of the Qizilbash governors, over whose administration the centre had virtually no control, and Gommans records that such tribal leaders held their tiyuls more or less permanently. For Streusand it is liability to frequent reassignment that separates the mansabdar from the tribal chief and makes him behave more like a bureaucrat, and mansabdar rebellions were remarkably few. Gommans adds a difference of scale, Safavid public expenditure standing at about one-fifth of the Mughal figure before the conquest of the Deccan sultanates. Streusand's summary judgement is that all three empires used land-revenue assignment but in profoundly different ways, their military organisations and provincial administrations differing about as much as possible.

The European parallel is rejected more firmly still. Saran insisted that jagirs were in no sense like the fiefs of the feudal lords of medieval Europe and represented no political charge, the assignment even of a whole province conferring no authority to appoint the diwan, sadr, qazi or faujdar. Richards likewise states that what a jagir-holder held were fiscal rights alone, unaccompanied by any right of ownership, occupancy or residence: "This was not a fief." Habib drew the contrast the other way round, arguing that the Mughal jagirdar, unlike his feudal counterpart in western Europe, had no reason to fear the dissolving influence of money and trade, since the assignment system presupposed a developed cash nexus.

== Historiography ==
Study of the system began with translation, and with a warning about it. Saran held that Heinrich Blochmann's note on the mansabdars is indispensable but that the Ain-i Akbari translations must never be relied on without reference to the originals, since the statistics in the second volume, Jarrett's, are transcribed with many errors and omissions that have misled many scholars. The two foundational European studies were Paul Horn's Das Heer und Kriegswesen der grossmoghuls (1894) and William Irvine's The Army of the Indian Moghuls (1903). Irvine's scepticism about reconstructing army strength from zat totals closed that line of enquiry: he rejected the attempts of Horn and Blochmann to reconstruct total strength from rank totals, and neither has been revived.

Irvine also shaped the explanation of decline. Streusand identifies him as the first to treat the question in a systematic way, dwelling on the degeneracy he saw in the later emperors and in their officers, thereby furnishing a justification for British rule, and pairs him with Jadunath Sarkar, who blamed Aurangzeb's religious policy and a consequent Hindu reaction. Alam likewise treats Irvine and Sarkar as the authors of the first detailed histories of the period and judges that their explanation never got past the outlook of the Persian chroniclers of the seventeenth and eighteenth centuries. That reading is now superseded: Satish Chandra rejected the older attribution of major responsibility for the downfall to Aurangzeb's religious policy as unhistorical.

The institutional studies of the 1930s and 1940s established most of the administrative detail still in use. The Central Structure of the Mughal Empire, which Ibn Hasan published in 1936, was presented as covering the whole ground of Mughal administration at headquarters in a manner never before attempted and as a necessary companion volume to the Ain. Abdul Aziz settled the reading of the dual rank discussed above, and rejected Moreland's claim that Babur brought the Timurid system to northern India, arguing that ranking was apparently of long standing in India by Sher Shah's time.

The Aligarh school, which Faruqui dates to the decades between the 1940s and the 1980s, was largely focused on administrative institutions and asserted that the Mughal polity, much like a modern state, was a highly centralised, systematised and stable entity; this became the starting point for most explanations of imperial success and failure, with religion largely discounted as a factor in collapse. Farhat Hasan identifies the most forceful statement of the thesis as Athar Ali's 1978 article for the Journal of the Royal Asiatic Society, and observes that the label understates how wide the currency of the model became. Alam credits the 1959 study Parties and Politics at the Mughal Court, by Satish Chandra, as the first study to examine seriously how the system was structurally flawed, and to do so in order to explain eighteenth-century decline, and Streusand credits him with placing the study of decline on a more empirical footing. Irfan Habib added the agrarian dimension discussed above, an interpretation which Richards notes coloured virtually all subsequent writing.

The statistical turn followed. Streusand's bibliographical essay describes Athar Ali's The Apparatus of Empire as a register recording each grant of rank and office made to the nobility across the years 1574 to 1658. Gommans places the technical literature on the mansab in a sequence running from the 1930s to the prosopographical work of the 1980s.

Recent work has questioned the centralised picture rather than the technical findings. Streusand sets out the rival categorisations of the polity, the colonial-era and Aligarh view of a centralised bureaucratic despotism with an unquenchable drive for revenue, Blake's patrimonial-bureaucratic state and Richards's position, and quotes Athar Ali's insistence that the picture of a centralised polity geared to systematisation remains unshaken. Faruqui describes the perspective that had emerged by the late 1990s, of an empire less like a road-roller than a spider's web, uneven in its grip and resting only lightly on the society beneath it, and adds that the resulting debate had an irresolvable and increasingly rancorous quality. Farhat Hasan objects that the centralised, patrimonial and segmentary models alike are synchronic, static and formal, isolating the state from social forces, and argues that Mughal sovereignty operated through hierarchical relations with local power-holders holding concurrent rights rather than through graded authority flowing downward from the emperor. Gommans relocates the mansab in a competitive military labour market which the state could not afford to leave to rival employers, imperial rank serving to seduce movable warlords and their followings into becoming co-sharers in the realm, a reading built on Kolff's demonstration that an integrated market in military service had developed in medieval India in which no power could claim a monopoly. Streusand is sharply critical of the older schools, judging that Sarkar and Habib represent two generations of serious scholarship whose conclusions owe more to their authors' convictions than to the evidence they assembled, and he leaves the depth of Mughal penetration an open question, observing that the regime largely lacked local anchorage and seemed to rest on the surface of provincial society.

== See also ==
- Government of the Mughal Empire
- Army of the Mughal Empire
- Zabt
- Dahsala system
- Mughal fiscal system
- Agrarian crisis of the Mughal Empire
- Faujdar

== Sources ==
- Abul Fazl (1873). The Ain i Akbari. Vol. I. Translated by Blochmann, H. Calcutta: Asiatic Society of Bengal.
- Blochmann, H. (1873). "Notes and biographical notices". The Ain i Akbari. Vol. I. Calcutta: Asiatic Society of Bengal.
- Alam, Muzaffar (1986). The Crisis of Empire in Mughal North India: Awadh and the Punjab, 1707–48. Delhi: Oxford University Press. ISBN 978-0-19-563000-8.
- Ali, M. Athar (1966). The Mughal Nobility under Aurangzeb. Bombay: Asia Publishing House.
- Aziz, Abdul (1945). The Mansabdari System and the Mughal Army. Lahore: Mohammad Ahmad.
- Blake, Stephen P. (1991). Shahjahanabad: The Sovereign City in Mughal India, 1639–1739. Cambridge: Cambridge University Press.
- Chandra, Satish (2002). Parties and Politics at the Mughal Court, 1707–1740 (4th ed.). New Delhi: Oxford University Press.
- Faruqui, Munis D. (2012). The Princes of the Mughal Empire, 1504–1719. Cambridge: Cambridge University Press. ISBN 978-1-107-02217-1.
- Gommans, Jos (2002). Mughal Warfare: Indian Frontiers and High Roads to Empire, 1500–1700. London: Routledge.
- Habib, Irfan (1963). The Agrarian System of Mughal India, 1556–1707. Bombay: Asia Publishing House.
- Hasan, Farhat (2004). State and Locality in Mughal India: Power Relations in Western India, c. 1572–1730. Cambridge: Cambridge University Press. ISBN 978-0-521-84119-1.
- Ibn Hasan (1936). The Central Structure of the Mughal Empire. London: Oxford University Press.
- Irvine, William (1903). The Army of the Indian Moghuls: Its Organization and Administration. London: Luzac.
- Khan, Iqtidar Alam (2004). Gunpowder and Firearms: Warfare in Medieval India. New Delhi: Oxford University Press.
- Mukhia, Harbans (2004). The Mughals of India. Oxford: Blackwell. ISBN 978-0-631-18555-0.
- Raychaudhuri, Tapan; Habib, Irfan, eds. (1982). The Cambridge Economic History of India, Volume 1: c. 1200 – c. 1750. Cambridge: Cambridge University Press. ISBN 978-0-521-22692-9.
- Richards, John F. (1993). The Mughal Empire. The New Cambridge History of India. Vol. I.5. Cambridge: Cambridge University Press. ISBN 978-0-521-56603-2.
- Saran, P. (1941). The Provincial Government of the Mughals, 1526–1658. Allahabad: Kitabistan.
- Sarkar, Jadunath (1920). Mughal Administration. Calcutta: M. C. Sarkar.
- Streusand, Douglas E. (2011). Islamic Gunpowder Empires: Ottomans, Safavids, and Mughals. Boulder: Westview Press.
- Tripathi, R. P. (1959). Some Aspects of Muslim Administration (2nd rev. ed.). Allahabad: Central Book Depot.
