= List of mothers of the Mughal emperors =

This list includes the biological mothers of Mughal emperors. There were nineteen emperors of the Mughal Empire in thirteen generations. Throughout the 331-year history of the Mughal Empire the emperors were all members of the same house, the house of Timurid.

| Name (birth name) | Son | Ethnicity | Place of origin |
|---|---|---|---|
| Qutlugh Nigar Khanum | Babur | Turkic-Mongol | Moghulistan, Chagatai Khanate |
| Maham Begum | Humayun | Turkic-Mongol | Khorasan, Persia |
| Hamida Banu Begum (Maryam Makani) | Akbar | Persian | Khorasan, Persia |
| Wali Nimat Mariam-uz-Zamani | Jahangir | Rajput | Amber, Mughal Empire |
| Manavati Bai (Bilqis Makani) | Shah Jahan | Rajput | Marwar, Mughal Empire |
| Arjumand Banu Begum (Mumtaz Mahal) | Aurangzeb | Persian | Agra, Mughal Empire |
| Rabia-ud-Daurani (Dilras Banu Begum) | Azam Shah | Safavid Persian | Mughal Empire |
| Nawab Bai (Rahmat-un-Nissa) | Bahadur Shah I | Kashmiri Muslim | Rajauri, Kashmir |
| Nizam Bai | Jahandar Shah | Hyderabadi Muslims | Hyderabad, Golconda Sultanate |
| Sahiba Niswan Begum | Farrukhsiyar | Kashmiri | Kashmir, Mughal Empire |
| Nur-un-Nissa Begum | Rafi ud-Darajat | Persian | Khurasan, Persia |
| Qudsia ul-Alqab Hazrat Begum (Fakhr un-nisa) | Muhammad Shah | Muslim | Mughal Empire |
| Qudsia Begum (Udham Bai) | Ahmad Shah Bahadur | Shia Islam | Mughal Empire |
| Anup Bai | Alamgir II | Hindu | Mughal Empire |
| Rushqimi Begum | Shah Jahan III | Muslim | Mughal Empire |
| Zinat Mahal (Bilal Kunar) | Shah Alam II | Hindu | Mughal Empire |
| Qudsia Begum (unknown) | Akbar Shah II | Muslim | Mughal Empire |
| Lal Bai | Bahadur Shah II | Hindu | Mughal Empire |

== Bibliography ==
- Gulbadan, Begum (1902). The History of Humāyūn (Humāyūn-Nāmā). Translated by Beveridge, Annette S. London: Royal Asiatic Society.
- Irvine, William (1922). Sarkar, Jadunath (ed.). Later Mughals. Vol. I. London: Luzac.
- Jahangir (1909). Beveridge, Henry (ed.). The Tūzuk-i-Jahangīrī Or Memoirs Of Jahāngīr. Vol. I. Translated by Rogers, Alexander. London: Royal Asiatic Society.
- Nath, R.; Nath, Ajay (2018). Monuments of Delhi: Architectural & Historical (2nd ed.). The Heritage. ISBN 978-81-85105-33-8.
