= Nur-un-Nissa Begum =

Wife of Emperor Bahadur Shah I

- Born: Khurasan
- Died: February 1701; Kabul, Mughal Empire
- Spouse: Bahadur Shah I (m. 1659; died 1701)
- Issue: Rafi-ush-Shan
- House: Timurid (by marriage)
- Father: Sanjar Khan Najam Sani
- Religion: Islam

Nur-un-Nissa Begum (Persian: نورالنسا بیگم; meaning "Light among women"; died February 1701) was the first wife and chief consort of Mughal Emperor Bahadur Shah I.

She was the mother of his third son, Prince Rafi-ush-Shan, and exercised great influence over her husband. Nur-un-Nissa was also the grandmother of future Emperors Rafi ud-Darajat, Shah Jahan II, and Muhammad Ibrahim. She died in 1701, six years before Bahadur Shah's accession to the throne.

== Family ==
Born at Khurasan, Nur-un-Nissa Begum was the daughter of Sanjar Khan Najam Sani.

== Marriage ==
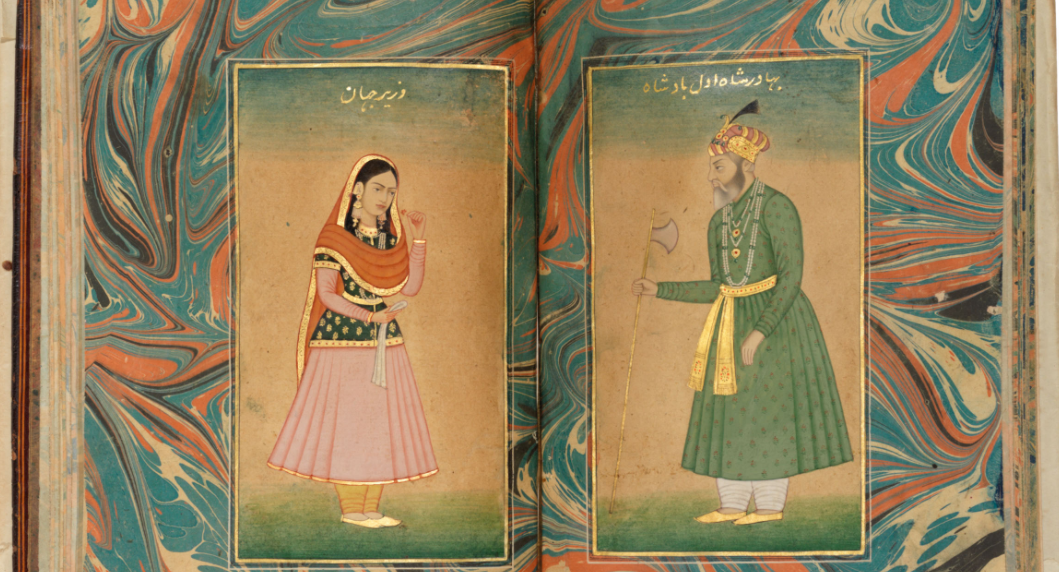
Bahudar Shah I and a consort.

She married Prince Muhammad Muazzam (future Bahadur Shah I) on 30 December 1659, after his return from Deccan to Delhi with Wazir Khan. The customary royal gifts were given to the bride and the bridegroom. In 1671, she gave birth to a son. Mirza Muahammad, an agent of Muazzam escorted the mother and son to Aurangzeb, who gave the baby the name of Rafi-ush-Shan.

She was adorned with many commandable qualities. She had monopolized Muazzam's heart by her accomplishments. She composed Hindi verses, and was famous for her charity and helpfulness to the needy. She won her husband's heart by her excellent behavior, obedience, and attractiveness, and because of this his other wives were jealous of her. They accused her of immorality and of being the cause of message between Abul Hasan Qutb Shah, the ruler of Golconda, and Muazzam, and other bad acts.

Muhammad Azam Shah's partisans and Muazzam's enemies began to say that Nur-un-Nissa had gone to Golconda and settled with Abul Hasan, and that if the Emperor did not accept his appeal for peace with him, Muazzam would also join him. As a result, Muazzam was placed in confinement for seven years in the Deccan. Muazzam's sons and Nur-un-Nissa were also imprisoned in separate jails. She was often insulted and rebuked by Aurangzeb's eunuchs. She was deprived of her liberty, her property was escheated, and her chief officer was tortured to make him reveal the suspected disloyal acts of Muazzam and Nur-un-Nissa. During this time Juliana Dias da Costa remained with her and served as her maid.

In 1693, both Nur-un-Nissa and Muazzam were released from prison. In 1699, Muazzam was appointed the governor of Kabul, where Nur-un-Nissa accompanied him. During their stay at Kabul, Aurangzeb presented Amat-ul-Habib to Muazzam in order to spite Nur-un-Nissa. Amat-ul-Habib was mother to a son born in 1700 at Khairabad.

== Death ==
Nur-un-Nissa Begum died at Kabul in February 1701. According to Niccolao Manucci, "she was in every way a most accomplished princess". Her death was a great affliction to both Muazzam and Rafi-ush-Shan. Aurangzeb and all the courtiers came to them, and offered their condolences.

== Bibliography ==
- Syed, Anees Jahan (1977). Aurangzeb in Muntakhab-al Lubab. Somaiya Publications.
- Sarkar, Jadunath (1947). Maasir-i-Alamgiri: A History of Emperor Aurangzib-Alamgir (reign 1658-1707 AD) of Saqi Mustad Khan. Royal Asiatic Society of Bengal, Calcutta.
- Irvine, William (2006). The Later Mughals. Low Price Publications. ISBN 8175364068.
- Latif, Bilkees I. (2010). Forgotten. Penguin Books India. p. 31. ISBN 978-0-143-06454-1.
- Sarkar, Sir Jadunath (1972). History of Aurangzib based on original sources - Volume 4. S. C. Sarkar & Sons ltd.
