= Rafi-ush-Shan =

Mughal prince (1671–1712)

Rafi-ush-Shan رفیع اش شان
- Shahzada of the Mughal Empire; Mirza
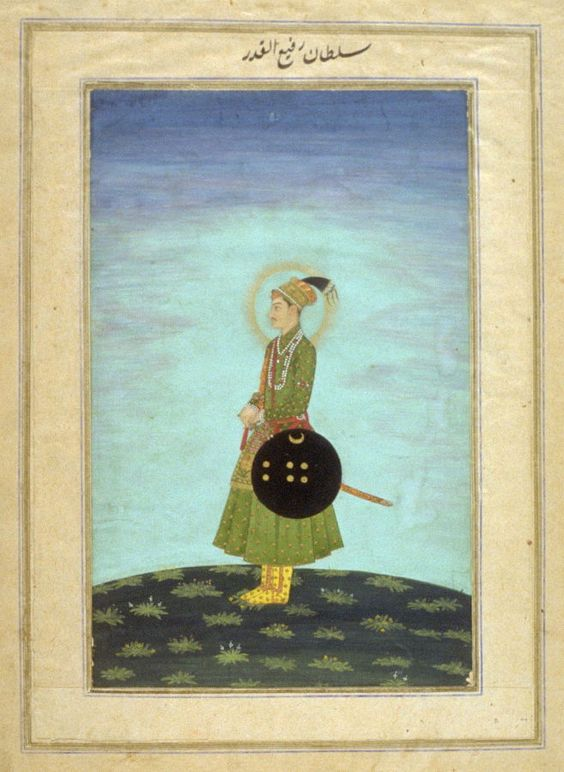
- Portrait of Rafi-ush-Shan, c. 1704

Subahdar of Sindh
- Reign: 1707–1710
- Badshah: Bahadur Shah I

Subahdar of Assam
- Reign: 1707–1710
- Badshah: Bahadur Shah I

Subahdar of Kashmir
- Reign: 1710–1712
- Badshah: Bahadur Shah I
- Born: 1671; Delhi, Mughal Empire
- Died: 29 March 1712 (aged 40–41); Punjab, Mughal Empire
- Burial: Humayun's Tomb, Delhi
- Spouse: Raziyat-un-Nissa Begum (m. 1695); Nur-un-Nissa Begum
- Issue: Rafi ud-Darajat; Shah Jahan II; Muhammad Ibrahim
Names
- Rafi-ush-Shan Mirza
- House: Mughal dynasty
- Dynasty: Timurid dynasty
- Father: Bahadur Shah I
- Mother: Nur-un-nissa Begum
- Religion: Islam

Rafi-ul-Qadr (Persian: رفیع القدر) (29 – 1671 March 1712), better known by his title, Mirza Rafi' ush-Shan Bahadur, was the third son of the Mughal emperor Bahadur Shah I.

== Life and mughal service ==
Rafi' ush-Shan Bahadur was born in Delhi to Prince Mu'azzam and Nur-un-Nisa Begum, the daughter of Sanjar Najm-i-sani. He was 10 when he was appointed by his grandfather Aurangzeb as qiladar of Malakand.

After the accession of his father to the Mughal throne in 1707, he was appointed the subahdar of Sindh and Assam from 1707 to 1710; and Kashmir from 1710 to 1712.

He was killed along with his older brother Jahan Shah in the succession struggle after the death of their father. He is buried in Agra.

== Family ==
One of his wives was Raziyat-un-nissa Begum, the daughter of Prince Muhammad Akbar. He had married her in 1695 at Agra, during the same time as his brother Jahan Shah had married her sister Zakiyat-un-nissa Begum. Another was Nur-un-nissa Begum, daughter of Shaikh Baqi. She was the mother of Rafi ud-Darajat and Muhammad Ibrahim.

His sons Rafi ud-Darajat, Muhammad Ibrahim and Shah Jahan II would later become Mughal emperors.

== Bibliography ==
- Irvine, William (1922), Sarkar, Jadunath (ed.), The Later Mughals, vol. I, Calcutta: M. C. Sarkar & Sons
