= Gujarat under Farrukhsiyar =

The Mughal Empire's province Gujarat (now in India) was managed by the viceroys appointed by the emperors. The emperor Jahandar Shah who had come to power in 1712 was defeated by his nephew Farrukhsiyar in put to death in 1713. As he was helped by noble Sayad brothers, he was under their influence. He concluded treaty with Ajitsingh of Jodhpur. Daud Khan Panni, the powerful general, was appointed as the viceroy but there were riots in Ahmedabad in 1714. Ajitsingh was appointed as the next viceroy who had disputes with other noble Haidar Kúli Khán. After some reluctance, Ajitsingh let Khán Daurán Nasrat Jang Bahádur to be appointed as the next viceroy. In 1719, the emperor Farrukhsiyar was deposed by influential Sayad brothers in 1719. He was succeeded by short reigns of Rafi ud-Darajat and Shah Jahan II. Finally Muhammad Shah was raised to the throne by them.

== Viceroys under Farrukhsiyar (1713–1719) ==
This expedition of Farrukhsiyar was successful. He put Jahandar Shah to death and mounted the throne in 1713. As he had been raised to the throne mainly by the aid of Sayads Husain Áli and Abdullah Khán, the new emperor fell under the power of these nobles. Husain Áli was sent against Ajítsingh of Márwár, and concluded a treaty with that chief, whereby Ajítsingh engaged to send his son to court and to give his daughter to the emperor in marriage: and the marriage was solemnised in 1715. In 1714, shortly after this treaty was concluded, Ajítsingh sent his son Abheysingh to court, and on him in place of one Sayad Áhmed Gíláni was conferred the post of governor of Sorath. Abheysingh remained at court and sent his deputy Káyath Fatehsingh to Junagadh. Abdúl Hamíd Khán was appointed revenue officer of Surat. After some time he resigned his Surat office and went to court, where on being made superintendent of the shrine of Sheikh Ahmed Khattu, he returned to Áhmedábád. In 1713, Muhtarim Khán was appointed to succeed him in Surat.

=== Shahámat Khán, Forty-fifth Viceroy, 1713 and Dáud Khán Panni, Forty-sixth Viceroy, 1714–15 ===
Early in 1714, Shahámat Khán, who had been appointed forty-fifth viceroy of Gujarát, was superseded by Daud Khan Panni as forty-sixth viceroy. The reckless courage of Dáud Khán Panni was renowned throughout India. His memory survives in the tales and proverbs of the Dakhan. On giving battle he used to show his contempt for his enemies by wearing nothing stronger than a muslin jerkin. So stern was his discipline that none of his Afghán soldiers dared to touch a leaf of the standing crops where they were encamped. When at Áhmedábád, he was either engaged in scattering the Kolis or in coursing with greyhounds. He preferred life under canvas on the Sábarmati sands to the viceregal surroundings of the Bhadra Palace. His civil work he used to trust to Dakhan Bráhmans and Pandits. He was much devoted to the use of bhang.

Until Dáud Khán's arrival, Abdúl Hamíd Khán was appointed viceroy and took charge of the province from Shahámat Khán. At this time, on the security of Rája Muhkamsingh of Nágor, a sum of Rupees 50,000 was granted to the brother of Durgádás Ráthoḍ.

Riots in Áhmedábád, 1714

In 1714, in Áhmedábád Harírám, the agent of Madan Gopál a successful North Indian banker, who came to Áhmedábád as treasurer with Fírúz Jang, while celebrating the Holi with his friends, seized a Muslim gentleman and handled him with great roughness. Aggrieved with this treatment the Muslim complained to a preacher of much eloquence and influence, Mulla Muhammad Áli. The preacher took the Muslim to the Assembly Mosque and sent for Mulla Abdúl Âzíz the chief or leading member of the Sunni Bohra community. He answered the call with a strong party of his men, and on his way was joined by numbers of Muslims both soldiers and citizens. With cries of ‘Dín’ ‘Dín’, they went to the mosque and carried off the insulted man and the priest and the Bohra leader to the house of the Kázi Khair-ul-láh. The Kázi closed his doors against the crowd who returned abusing him to the Ratanpol pillaging and killing as they went. They next swarmed towards Madan Gopál's Haveli in the Ratanpol. But the Nagarsheth Kapurchand Bhansáli closed its strong gates and with his Muslim soldiers met the swarm with firearms. The viceroy who was camped at the Shahibaug sent soldiers and under the influence of the leading citizens of both classes, the disturbance was quelled. When the particulars of the riots were known in the imperial camp, the Hindus, clamouring against Mulla Muhammad Áli and Sheikh Abdúl Âzíz Gujaráti, struck business and closed their shops. The emperor ordered mace-bearers to proceed to Gujarát and bring the Muslim ringleaders together with the Hindu Nagarsheth Kapurchand Bhansáli. Some Bohras at the imperial camp, sending advance-news to Áhmedábád, the Mullah, and the Bohra Sheth and after him, the Bhansáli started for the imperial camp. On reaching the camp the Mulla, who was very impressive and eloquent, preached a sermon in the Assembly Mosque and his fame reaching the emperor, he was called to court and asked to preach. He and the Sheth were now able to explain their case to the emperor and the Bhansáli was imprisoned. It is said that the Bhansáli made the Mulla the medium of his release and that he and the Bohra returned to Gujarát while the Mulla remained in honour at court till he died.

About the same time a great flood in the Sábarmati did much damage.

Abdúl Hamíd Khán was now chosen governor of Sorath in place of Abheysingh, and Momín Khán was appointed from Delhi, governor of Surat, and was at the same time placed in charge of Baroda, Bharuch, Dholka, Petlad and Nadiad. Dáud Khán, the viceroy now went into Kathiawad and Nawanaagr to collect tribute, and on his return to Áhmedábád, married the daughter of the chief of Halvad in the Jhalawad. It is related that this lady, who was with child, on hearing of Dáud Khán's death cut open her womb and saved the child at the sacrifice of her own life. Dáud Khán, though an excellent soldier and strict disciplinarian failed to distinguish himself as a civil administrator. He introduced Dakhani pandits into official posts, who levied a fee called chithyáman from landholders and took taxes from the holdings of Sayads and otherwise made themselves unpopular.

About this time Momín Khán, governor of Surat, arrived in Gujarát, and placing his deputies in Petlád, Dholka, Baroda, and Naḍiád, went himself to Surat in 1715. Here he was opposed by the commandant of the fort, Zia Khán, who was obliged to give way, his subordinate, Sayad Kásim, being defeated by Fidá-ud-dín Khán.

There were Hindu-Muslim riots again in Ahmedabad in 1715. On this account, and for other reasons, Dáud Khán was recalled, and Ghazni Khán Jhálori was directed to act in his place until the arrival of a new viceroy.

=== Mahárája Ajítsingh, Forty-seventh Viceroy, 1715–16 ===
In 1715, the Mahárája Ajítsingh was appointed forty-seventh viceroy of Gujarát, and his son Kunvar Abheysingh was appointed governor of Sorath. Ajítsingh sent Vajeráj Bhandári to act as his deputy until his arrival, and Fatehsingh Káyath was chosen deputy governor of Sorath. Perhaps one of the most remarkable appointments of this time was that of Haidar Kúli Khán to be minister as well as military commandant of Baroda, Nándod, Arhar-Mátar (in Kheda district), and of the ports of Surat and Cambay. Haidar Kúli chose an officer to act for him as minister, and after appointing deputies in his different charges himself went to Surat.

The Mahárája Ajítsingh, on reaching Áhmedábád, appointed Ghazni Khán Jhálori governor of Palanpur and Jawán Mard Khán Bábi governor of Radhanpur. During this year an imperial order conferred on Haidar Kúli Khán, Sorath and Gohilwad or south-east Kathiawad then in charge of Fatehsingh, the viceroy's deputy. On receiving this order Haidar sent Sayad Âkil as his deputy, and that officer went to Jambusar, and, collecting men, set out to join his appointment. He first camped at Loliánah, where the province of Sorath begins, and from Loliánah marched against Palitana and plundered the town.

Disagreement between the Viceroy and Haidar Kúli Khán, 1715

The viceroy, who was by no means well disposed to Haidar Kúli Khán, sent a message that if any injury was done in Sorath he would take vengeance on the aggressors; and as neither Ajítsingh nor Haidar Kúli Khán was of a very compliant temper, civil war was on the point of breaking out. By the help of Salábat Khán Bábi, the deputy in Gohilwad, matters were arranged, and Sayad Âkil returned from Sorath. Haidar was anxious to send Salábat Khán as deputy to Sorath. But as Salábat demanded too high a salary, Raza Kúli, brother of the late governor of Baroda, was chosen. When this officer, with his brother Maâsúm Kúli, reached Amreli, Fatehsingh, the viceroy's deputy, evacuated Junágaḍh. After this Haidar Kúli Khán, in company with Kázím Beg, governor of Baroda, marched against and defeated the chief of Munjpur (near Rádhanpur), who had refused to pay the usual tribute. The viceroy went to Sorath to collect the imperial revenue, and, owing to his excessive demands, met with armed resistance from the Jám of Nawanagar. Finally, the matter of tribute was settled, and after visiting the shrine of Dwarka, the viceroy returned to Áhmedábád.

=== Khán Daurán Nasrat Jang Bahádur, Forty-eighth Viceroy, 1716–1719 ===
In 1716, while the viceroy was at Dwarka, in consequence of numerous complaints against Ajítsingh and his Márwári followers, the emperor sent Samsám-ud-daulah Khán Daurán Nasrat Jang Bahádur as forty-eighth viceroy of Gujarát. As it was expected that Ajítsingh would not give up his government without a contest, an army was prepared to compel him to leave. On the arrival of the army, Ajítsingh marched straight on Áhmedábád and encamped at Sarkhej, but Nahar Khán persuaded him to retire to Jodhpur without giving battle. In 1717, after the departure of Ajítsingh, Haidar Kúli Khan, who had been appointed deputy viceroy, leaving Surat set out for Áhmedábád. When Haidar arrived at Petlád, some of the Áhmedábád nobles, among whom was Safdar Khán Bábi, went out to meet him. A dispute arose between one of Haidar's water carriers and a water-carrier in the army of the Bábi, which increased to a serious affray, which from the camp followers spread to the soldiers and officers, and the Bábi's baggage was plundered. Safdar Khán took serious offence, and returning to Áhmedábád collected his kinsmen and followers and marched against Haidar Kúli Khán. In a battle fought on the following day Safdar Khán was defeated. The other Bábis escaped to Pálanpur, and Safdar Khán, who in the first instance had fled to Atarsumba, joined his party at Pálanpur. Muhammad Fírúz Jhálori, governor of Pálanpur, with the title of Ghazni Khán, afterward succeeded in reconciling the Bábis and Haidar Kúli Khán.

Gujarat was affected by famine in 1719. Abdúl Hamíd Khán, who had filled so many appointments in Gujarát, went to court and was made governor of Sorath. Haidar Kúli Khán now marched against the Mahi Kolis. In the meantime, the news was received of the appointment of a new viceroy, and Ghazni Khán, governor of Pálanpur, was ordered to stay at Áhmedábád for the defense of the city.

In 1719, the emperor Farrukhsiyar was deposed by influential Sayad brothers in 1719. He was succeeded by short reigns of Rafi ud-Darajat and Shah Jahan II. Finally Muhammad Shah was raised to the throne by them.

== List of Viceroys under Farrukhsiyar (1713–1719) ==
- Shahámat Khán, Forty-fifth Viceroy, 1713
- Daud Khan Panni, Forty-sixth Viceroy, 1714–15
- Mahárája Ajítsingh, Forty-seventh Viceroy, 1715–16
- Khán Daurán Nasrat Jang Bahádur, Forty-eighth Viceroy, 1716–1719
