= Muhammad Ibrahim (Mughal emperor) =

Titular Mughal emperor in 1720

Jahangir II جهانگیر دوم
- Shahzada of the Mughal Empire; Mirza
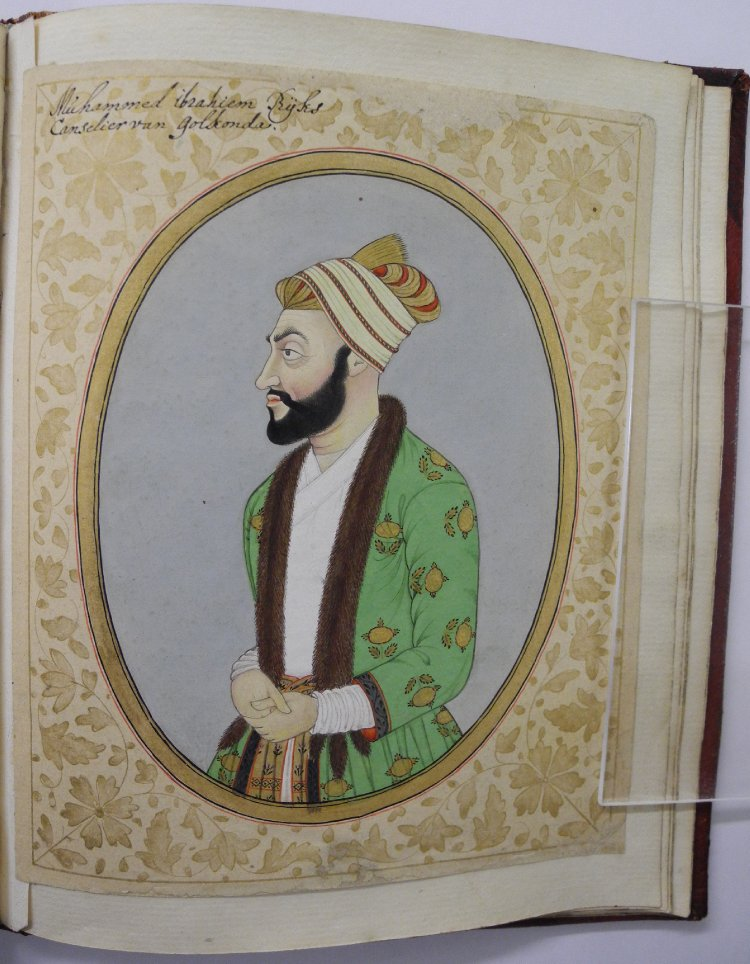

Titular Mughal Emperor
- Reign: 15 October – 13 November 1720
- Predecessor: Shah Jahan II
- Successor: Muhammad Shah
- Born: 9 August 1703; Tripoly Gate Prison, Red Fort, Delhi, Delhi Subah, Mughal Empire
- Died: 31 January 1746 (aged 42); Mughal Empire
- Burial: Mausoleum of Qutb-ud-Din Kaki, Delhi
Names
- Abu'l Fath Zahr-ud-Din Muhammad Jahangir II
Regnal name
- Jahangir II
- House: Mughal dynasty
- Dynasty: Timurid dynasty
- Father: Rafi-ush-Shan
- Mother: Nur-un-Nisa Begum
- Religion: Sunni Islam (Hanafi)

Jahangir II (Persian: جهانگیر دوم (9 August 1703 – 31 January 1746), born Mirza Muhammad Ibrahim, was a Mughal prince and claimant to the throne of the Mughal Empire in 1720.

== Early life ==
Muhammad Ibrahim was the youngest son of Prince Rafi-ush-Shan, son of Emperor Bahadur Shah I. His mother was Nur-un-nissa Begum, the daughter of Shaikh Baqi. He was the brother of Emperors Rafi ud Darajat and Shah Jahan II. On 2 December 1707, he was given the rank of 7000 and 2000 horses.

== Reign ==
On 15 October 1720, he was brought out of the prison and placed on the throne. He had been designated by the Sayyid brothers as the successor to his brother Shah Jahan II.

However, Sayyid Khan Jahan, the governor of Delhi, dreading Ibrahim's reputation for having a violent temper, installed his cousin Roshan Khan, the son of Prince Khujista Akhtar Jahan Shah, as the Mughal emperor. Muhammad Ibrahim was defeated in the battle of Hasanpur and deposed on 13 November 1720. He was sent back to the prison in the citadel of Shahjahanabad.

A quartrain quoted by Khush-hal Chand says that his day of power had been short-lived, "like a drop of dew upon a blade of grass."

== Death ==
He died on 30 January 1746, at the age of about forty-three years.

== Titles ==
His full title was: Abul Fath Zahir-ul-din Muhammad Ibrahim.

=== Coins ===
Sikka bar sim zad dar jahan ba fazal-i-Muhammad Ibrahim, Shah-i-shahan

Silver was stamped in the world by favour of Muhammad Ibrahim, the king of kings.

== Bibliography ==
- Irvine, William. The Later Mughals. Low Price Publications. ISBN 8175364068.
