= Shah Jahan II =

Mughal emperor in 1719

Rafi-ud-Daulah شاه جهان دوم
- Padishah; Al-Sultan Al-Azam
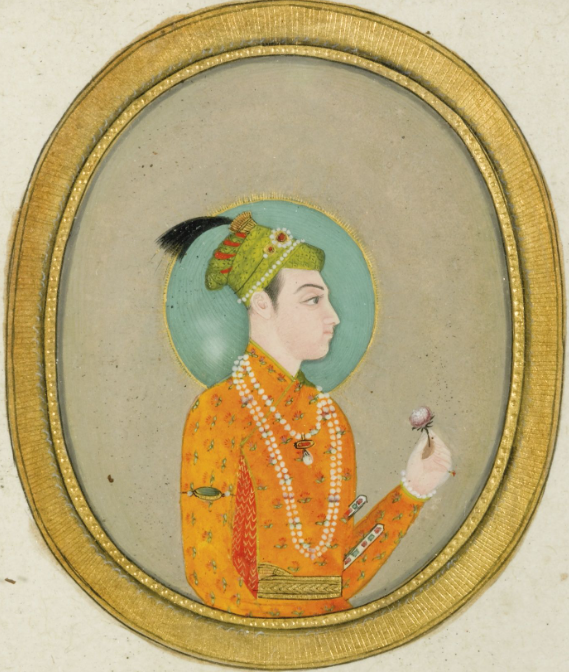
- Portrait of Rafi-ud-Daulah

Mughal Emperor
- Reign: 6 June – 17 September 1719
- Coronation: 8 June 1719
- Predecessor: Rafi-ud-Darajat
- Successor: Muhammad Shah; Jahangir II (titular)
- Born: Rafi-ud-Daulah; June 1696; Mughal Empire
- Died: 18 September 1719 (aged 23); Bidyapur, near Fatehpur Sikri, Mughal Empire (present-day Uttar Pradesh, India)
- Burial: Dargah of Qutb-ud-Din Bakhtiyar Kaki, Delhi, India
Names
- Mirza Rafi-ud-Din Muhammad Rafi-ud-Daulah Shah Jahan II
Regnal name
- Shah Jahan II
- House: Mughal dynasty
- Dynasty: Timurid dynasty
- Father: Rafi-ush-Shan
- Religion: Sunni Islam (Hanafi)

Shah Jahan II (Persian: شاه جهان دوم, Persian pronunciation: [ʃɑːh d͡ʒa.ˈhɑːn]; June 1696 – 17 September 1719), born Mirza Rafi-ud-Daulah (Persian: رفیع الدوله), was briefly the twelfth Mughal emperor in 1719.

After being chosen by the Sayyid brothers, he succeeded figurehead emperor Rafi-ud-Darajat on 6 June 1719. Shah Jahan II also served as a figurehead to the Sayyid brothers and would serve as emperor until his death from tuberculosis on 17 September 1719.

== Personal life ==
Shah Jahan II was born as Rafi ud-Daulah. He was the second son of Rafi-ush-Shan and a grandson of Bahadur Shah Shah Jahan II's exact date of birth is not known but he is believed to have been eighteen months older than his brother Rafi ud-Darajat. Whether he married or not, whether he had any child or not is also unknown.

== Reign ==
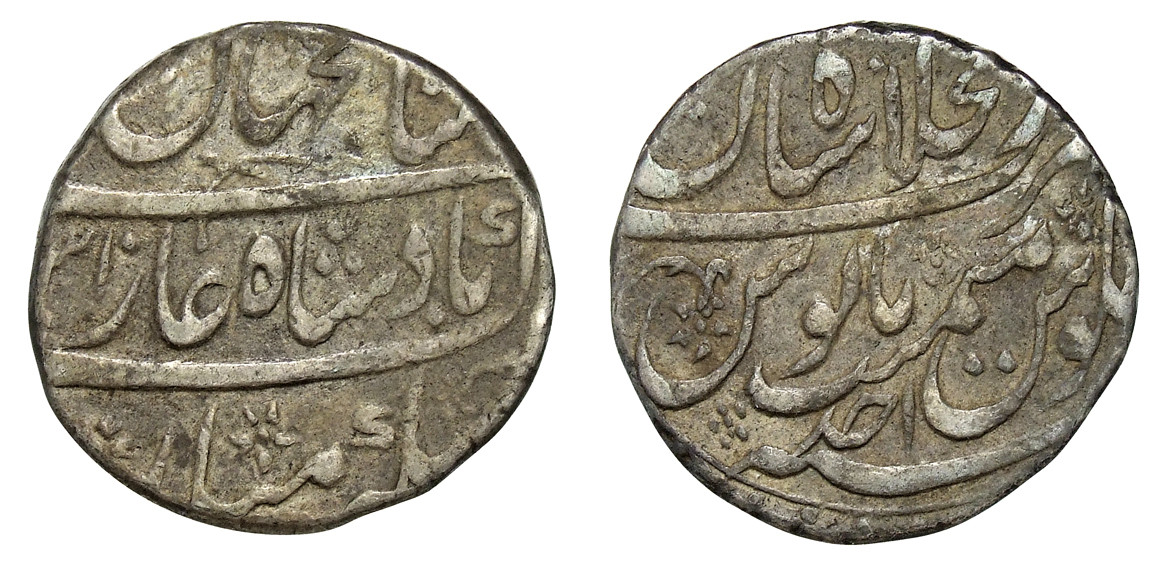
Coin of Shah Jahan II

Shah Jahan II ascended the throne on 6 June 1719 after the death of his younger brother Rafi ud-Darajat due to tuberculosis. His coronation took place at Diwan-i-Khas of the Red Fort. He took the title Shah Jahan II.

Just like his younger brother, Shah Jahan II was chosen by the kingmaker Sayyid brothers and wielded no power. His name was read in the khutbah for the first time on 13 June. His first appearance at the Diwan-i-Am was on 11 June. Without the presence of one of the Sayyid brothers, he was not allowed to meet any noble or to attend the jummah.

== Death ==
Shah Jahan II suffered from tuberculosis just like his younger brother. He was physically and mentally unfit to perform the duties of a ruler. He died on 17 September 1719 at Bidyapur. He was buried beside Rafi ud-Darajat at the dargah of Qutbuddin Bakhtiar Kaki at Mehrauli in Delhi.

Muhammad Hadi Kamwar Khan claimed that Shah Jahan II was poisoned by the Sayyid brothers, but historian William Irvine disputed this, saying that the Shah's diarrhoea was due to opium withdrawal, that Kamwar Khan had much to be upset about since his prospects were ruined by Shah Jahan's death, and that the Sayyids had nothing to gain from his death.

== Aftermath ==
He was succeeded by Muhammad Shah.

== Bibliography ==
- Chandra, Satish (2005). Medieval India: From Sultanat to the Mughals Part – II. Har-Anand Publications. ISBN 9788124110669.
- Irvine, William (1921). The Later Mughals. Low Price Publications. ISBN 8175364068.
- Mehta, Jaswant Lal (2005). Advanced Study in the History of Modern India 1707–1813. Sterling Publishers. ISBN 9781932705546.

Shah Jahan II Timurid dynasty
Preceded by Rafi Ul-Darjat	Mughal Emperor; 1719	Succeeded by Muhammad Shah
