= Mihr Parwar Begum =

Wife of Bahadur Shah I

- Ladies from the harem of Bahadur Shah I, c. 17th century
- Died: 1744 (aged over 80 years) Delhi, Mughal Empire
- Spouse: Bahadur Shah I
- House: Timurid (by marriage)
- Religion: Islam

Mihr Parwar Begum (died 1744) was a consort of the Mughal emperor Bahadur Shah I. Originally a slave girl, she rose through the imperial hierarchy and used her influence to advance members of her family at the imperial court.

== Origins ==
Mihr Parwar was the sister of Shakir Khan, who became a prominent courtier after she entered the palace. She was of lowly origin, being a slave girl before she entered the imperial harem and became a consort of Bahadur Shah.

== As consort ==
She was described as an imperious woman and exercised great influence over her husband, and wielded considerable power in the harem. She felt jealousy for Amat-ul-Habib, another wife of Bahadur Shah, who was presented to him by Emperor Aurangzeb.

Mihr Parwar took a keen interest in the politics and affairs of the state. The post of Arz Mukarar (to bring up all orders a second time for confirmation) was held by Ikhlas Khan. He felt that a check should be devised on the Emperor's grants of ranks and money. He loathed his duty and later gave this post to Mustaid Khan instead. Mustaid Khan's job was to receive the applications for courtly positions after the first order were passed upon them, then institute an enquiry if the new men were fit for service or not, or if their promotions were well deserved and justified and verify on what grounds they are to be promoted. Mihr Parwar put great pressure on Mustaid Khan and forced him to sign the papers without much scrutiny. She personally presented applications for courtly positions to the Emperor, who signed them. Through her machinations, she successfully secured the advancement of her brother, Niyaz Beg Qulji Muhammad (Shakir Khan) to a prestigious post.

After the death of Bahadur Shah, his body was carefully sent to Delhi under the supervision of Mihr Parwar, along with Chin Qilich Khan. She patronised and financed a grand annual urs celebration at his tomb in Mehrauli, which reportedly cost lakhs of rupees. At his funeral, she performed an elaborate display of grief and mourning, beating the footguards whilst she wailed loudly. The festivities and grandeur of the annual urs ceremony is described in the Muraqqa-i-Dilli as such;

"His Begum, Mihr Parwar, with the help of Hayat Khan Nazir, starts the arrangements for the decoration of lamps [at the grave] a month in advance. Chandeliers of all kinds are hung and the artisans from the royal house come and give the lamps the shape of tree which when lighted put to shame both the Cyprus and the boxwood trees. When the place is fully lighted, it dazzles like sunlight and overshadows the moon. The sun realizing its unimportance sets and does not show its face before dawn. The towers of lamps throw lights as high as the sky. The bungalows in every lane shine as bright as the Valley of Tur."

— Dargah Quli Khan, Muraqqa-i-Dilli

She was a respected dowager during the reign of Muhammad Shah. After the death of the former Padshah Begum, Zinat-un-Nissa, Muhammad Shah took possession of the princess's property and all the items in her palace. Her possessions, which included an elephant canopy with gold spikes and a chandol were personally granted as gifts to Mihr Parwar Begum. Mihr Parwar died in 1744, over the age of 80.

A sarai (inn) called Sarai-Mihr Parwar which located between Narela and Sonipat, ten kos from Delhi beared her name.
