= Juliana Dias da Costa =

Harem-Queen to the Mughal emperor of India Bahadur Shah I

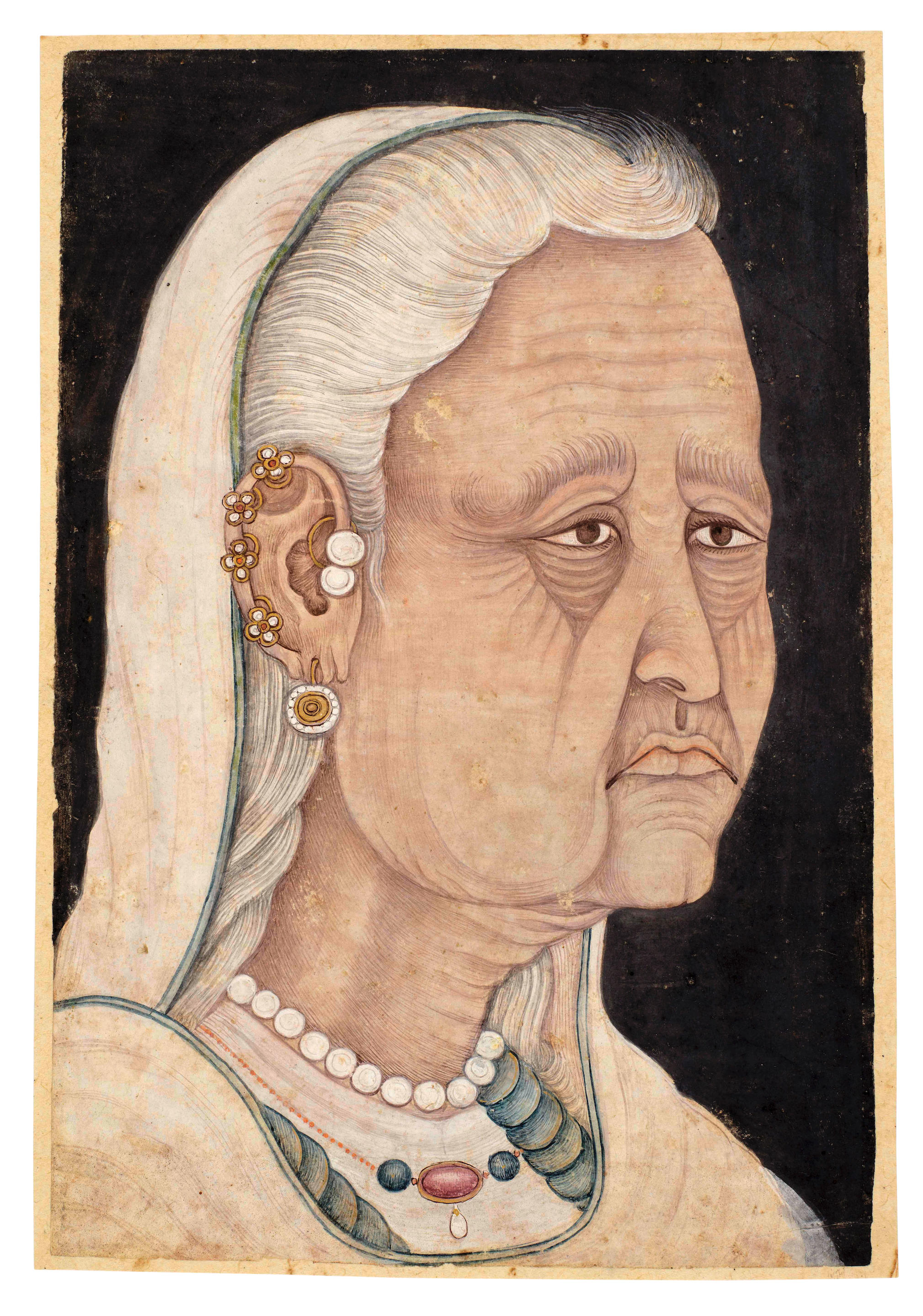
Mughal-era portrait of Bibi Juliyana as an elderly woman, dated c. 1730–50

Dona Juliana Dias da Costa (1658–1733) was a woman of Portuguese descent from Kochi taken to the Mughal Empire's court of Aurangzeb in Hindustan, who became a Harem-favorite of the Mughal emperor of India Bahadur Shah I, Aurangzeb's son, who became the monarch in the year 1707.

== Life ==
Juliana Dias da Costa was the daughter of the Portuguese physician Agostinho de Dias Costa. There has been contradictory stories about her early life. According to one version, her family fled the Dutch conquest of Portuguese Kochi (Cochim). According to another, they were taken as slaves when the Mughal Emperor destroyed the Portuguese settlement of Hooghly. Her father served as the physician at the Mughal court at Delhi, either as a slave or as a free. It is in any event known that her mother was a slave. Juliana herself was born in Delhi.

Juliana Dias da Costa entered the Mughal Harem serving the family (wife and mother) of the then prince Shah’Alam. She continued to do so after the prince fell into disfavour with his father and accompanied him into exile. She was rewarded when Shah’Alam became Emperor (Shah) Bahadur I upon his father's death and her influence in the court became great, even though she remained a Catholic in a Muslim state. Padre (priest) António Magalhães arranged Juliana's marriage to an unnamed Portuguese man after her mother died. Her husband died in battle shortly after. She is said to have ridden on a war elephant beside Bahadur Shah during his battles to defend his authority, and even after his death she continued to be highly considered, although with less influence.

During her period of strongest influence, while Bahadur Shah I was still alive, she was frequently sought out by European powers like the Dutch, Portuguese, the British, and the representatives of the Pope. She provided much assistance to the Society of Jesus, including helping the Italian Jesuit missionary Ippolito Desideri (1684–1733) in his mission to evangelise Tibet. In recognition of her many contributions and services to the Jesuits she was recognized as a Patroness of the Society.

Juliana was also responsible for setting up a sarai, or rest house, in the suburban village of Okhla in Delhi, which was subsequently named after her as Sarai Jullena and is a densely populated neighborhood today.

== Sources ==
- Maclagan, Sir Edward. The Jesuits and the Great Mogul. 1932: rpt. New York: Octagon Books, 1972: 181–189.
- Pomplun, Trent. Jesuit on the Roof of the World: Ippolito Desideri's Mission to Tibet. New York: Oxford University Press, 2010: 59,224n64.
