= Bidyapur =

Bidyapur बिद्यापुर
- Village development committee
- Location in Nepal
- Coordinates: 28.82°N 81.37°E
- Country: Nepal
- Province: Karnali Province
- District: Surkhet District

Population (1991)
  - Total: 4,053
- Time zone: UTC+5:45 (Nepal Time)

Bidyapur is a village development committee in Surkhet District in Karnali Province of mid-western Nepal. At the time of the 1991 Nepal census it had a population of 4053 people living in 707 individual households.

the country has good natural resources and tourist areas like Jajura Lake, Chamere Den, Madale Den, Gupti (Hidden) Lake, Bheri River for rafting and swimming. It is most potential VDC for rice production and vegetable Production. This is the educational center from very beginning. There is a Multiple Campus, Higher Secondary Schools and other schools.

There are different Social Development Organizations. Sundar Nepal Sanstha (BNA) (www.sundarnepal.org.np) is one of the pioneer organization from this VDC and working in different districts in Mid and Far West.
