= Nizam Bai =

Spouse of Mughal emperor Bahadur Shah I

- Born: c.1643 Hyderabad, Golconda Sultanate
- Died: 1692 (aged 48–49); Delhi, Mughal Empire
- Spouse: Bahadur Shah I (m. 1660)
- Issue: Jahandar Shah; Azz-ud-din
- House: Timurid (by marriage)
- Father: Fatehyawar Jang
- Religion: Islam

Nizam Bai (c.1643– 1692) was a wife of the eighth Mughal emperor, Bahadur Shah I. Though she never reigned as empress, having died several years before her husband ascended the throne, her son eventually succeeded as the Emperor Jahandar Shah.

== Background ==
There are differing accounts regarding Nizam Bai's origins. English traveller Jack Hogg described her as "a dancing-girl in the house of a Nawab." Alternatively, author Muni Lal found it more likely that she belonged to a noble family from Hyderabad. He stated that her father, Fatehyawar Jang, fought for Aurangzeb in the Mughal wars against the Deccan sultanates. Nizam Bai's marriage was supposedly done in recognition of this service.

== Life ==
Nizam Bai was married at the age of seventeen to Aurangzeb's son Prince Muazzam (the later Emperor Bahadur Shah I) on March 12, 1660. The couple's son, the eventual Emperor Jahandar Shah, was born little over a year afterwards.

She reportedly had great influence over her husband at one stage, though involved herself little in political matters. Much of her interests were instead focused on the arts, religion and charity, with a large portion of her incomes being used to provide dowries for disadvantaged girls.

Nizam Bai died in Delhi in 1692, her death being greatly mourned by the Emperor and other members of the royal family.
