= Jahan Shah (Mughal prince) =

Mughal prince (1673–1712)

Jahan Shah جهان شاه
- Shahzada of the Mughal Empire; Mirza
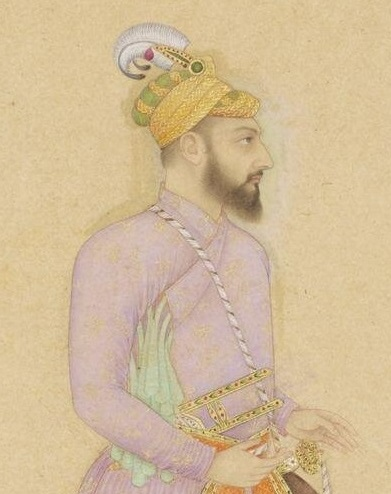
- Prince Jahan Shah, c. 1704

Subahdar of Malwa
- Reign: 1707–1712
- Badshah: Bahadur Shah I
- Born: 4 October 1673; Kabul, Kabul Subah, Mughal Empire (modern-day Afghanistan)
- Died: 30 March 1712 (aged 38); Lahore, Lahore Subah, Mughal Empire (modern-day Punjab, Pakistan)
- Burial: Humayun's Tomb, Delhi
- Spouse: Zakiyat-un-Nissa Begum (m. 1695); Fakhr-un-Nissa Begum; Nek Munzir
- Issue: Shahzada Farkhunda Akhtar; Muhammad Shah
Names
- Khujista Akhtar Jahan Shah Mirza
- House: Mughal dynasty
- Dynasty: Timurid dynasty
- Father: Bahadur Shah I
- Religion: Islam

Mirza Khujista Akhtar Jahan Shah (Persian: میرزا خجسته اختر جهان شاه) (4 October 1673 – 30 March 1712/30) was the fourth son of Emperor Bahadur Shah I.

== Life ==
He was made Subahdar of Malwa (1707–1712) and raised to an Imperial Mansab of 30,000 Zat and 20,000 Sawar. After his father's death, he sided with his brother Mu'izz-ud-Din and defeated his other brother, Azim-ush-Shan in 1712. But Mu'izz-ud-Din disagreed with him over the distribution of the Imperial treasury and fought a battle against him in which he was supposed to be killed along with his eldest son Farkhunda Akhtar. His youngest son Muhammad Shah later ruled as emperor for 28 years.

== Family ==
One of his wives was Zakiyat-un-Nissa Begum, the daughter of Prince Muhammad Akbar. He had married her at Agra in 1695, at the same time his brother Rafi-ul-qadr married her sister Raziyat-un-Nissa Begum. Another was Fakhr-un-Nissa Begum, known as Nawab Qudsiya, the descendant of Sarih Qazi, and the mother of Emperor Muhammad Shah. She died on 16 May 1733, aged about sixty years. Another of his wives was Nek Munzir, who died at Delhi, on 27 April 1744.

His eldest son was Shahzada Farkhunda Akhtar, who had born on was 1689 or 1690. He participated during the Imperial Civil war of 1712. According to Iradat Khan, Jahan Shah's son fought bravely with his father till their death.
