= Rafi ud-Darajat =

Mughal emperor in 1719

Rafi-ud-Darajat رفیع الدرجات
- Padishah; Al-Sultan Al-Azam
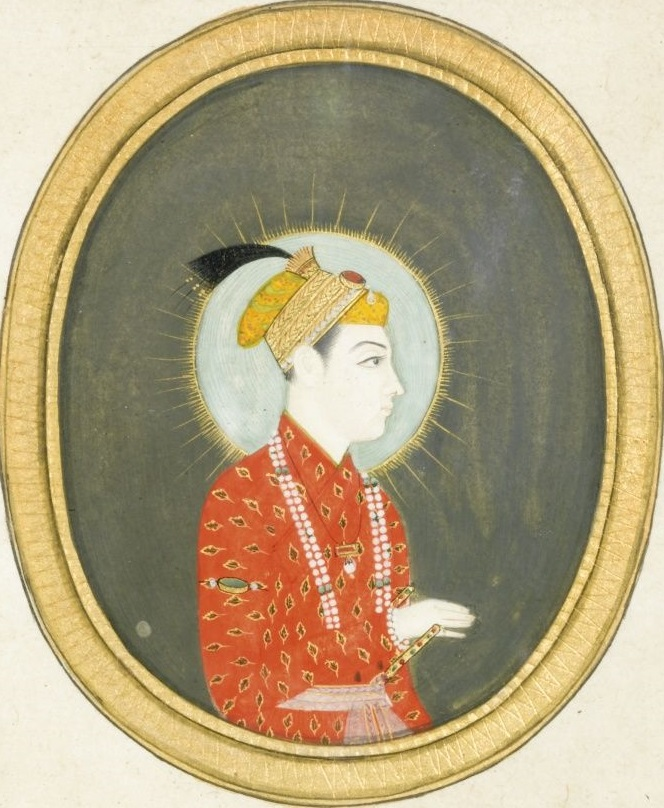
- Portrait of Rafi ud-Darajat

Mughal Emperor
- Reign: 28 February – 6 June 1719
- Predecessor: Farrukhsiyar
- Successor: Shah Jahan II
- Born: 1 December 1699; Mughal Empire
- Died: 6 June 1719 (aged 19); Agra, Mughal Empire
- Burial: Mausoleum of Khwaja Qutbuddin Kaki, Delhi, India
- Spouse: Inayat Banu Begum
Names
- Mirza Abu'l Barakat Shams-ud-Din Muhammad Rafi ud-Darajat Padshah Ghazi Shahanshah-i-Bahr-u-Bar
- House: Mughal dynasty
- Dynasty: Timurid dynasty
- Father: Rafi-ush-Shan
- Mother: Nur-un-Nisa Begum
- Religion: Sunni Islam (Hanafi)

Mirza Rafi Ul-Darjat (Persian: رفیع الدرجات, Persian pronunciation: [ɾa.fiːʔ.ud.da.ɾa.ˈd͡ʒɑːt]); 1 December 1699 – 6 June 1719) was briefly the eleventh Mughal emperor from 28 February 1719 until his death on 6 June 1719. He was the youngest son of Rafi-ush-Shan, the nephew of Azim-ush-Shan and a grandson of Bahadur Shah I.

He was placed on the throne by the Sayyid brothers after they deposed, blinded, imprisoned and executed emperor Farrukhsiyar with the help of Maharaja Ajit Singh and the Marathas in 1719.

== Reign ==
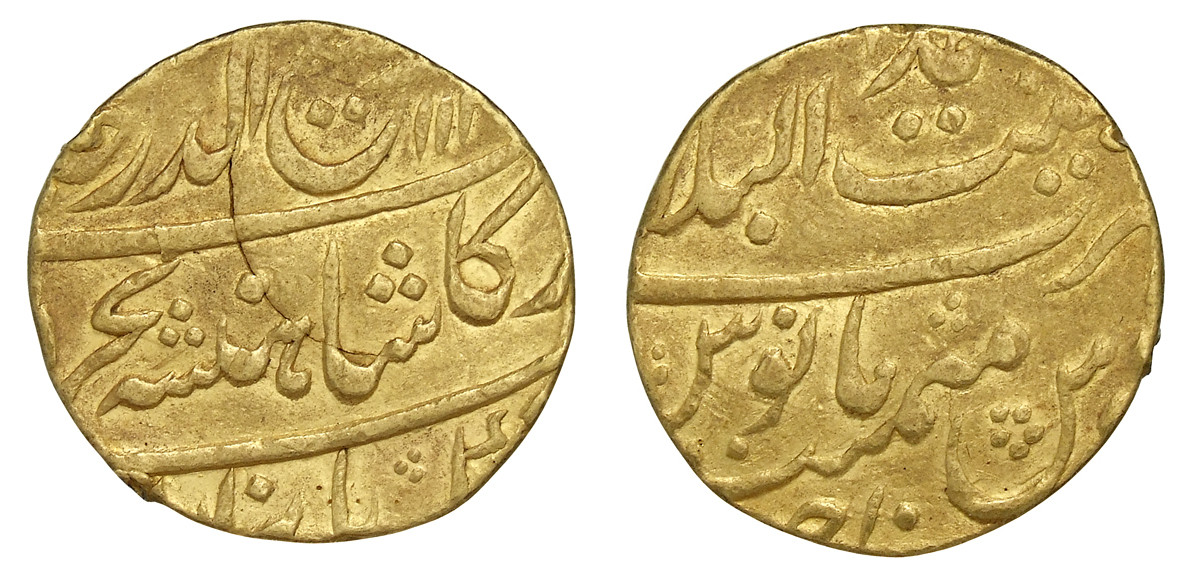
Coin of Rafi-ud-Darjat

=== Sayyid Brothers ===
Rafi ud-Darajat owed his throne to the Sayyid brothers - Sayyid Hassan Ali Khan Barha and Sayyid Hussain Ali Khan Barha - who had deposed emperor Farrukhsiyar with the help of Ajit Singh of Marwar and Balaji Vishwanath in 1719 and made themselves badishahgar (kingmakers). His short reign would be as a puppet ruler to the brothers.

=== Marathas ===
Having been helped by the Marathas in his accession, Rafi ud-Darajat returned the favour by granting Chauth and Sardeshmukhi rights in 6 Mughal provinces to them. The condition was that these would be collected by Mughal officials and handed to the Marathas.

=== Rival claim to throne ===
The reign of Rafi ud-Darajat was one of turbulence. On 18 May 1719, less than three months after his own accession, Rafi ud-Darajat's uncle, Nekusiyar, assumed the Mughal throne at the Agra Fort as he thought he was more eligible for the post.

The Sayyid brothers determined to defend the emperor they had raised to the throne and punish the offender retook the fort within three months and captured Nekusiyar. He would be respectfully received by the Amir ul-Umara and confined at the Salimgarh Fort where he died in 1723.

== Death and succession ==
Before dying, Rafi ud-Darajat had requested that his older brother Rafi ud-Daulah be enthroned. Rafi ud-Darajat died on 6 June 1719, either of tuberculosis or was murdered, serving as emperor for three months and six days. He was succeeded by Rafi ud-Daulah as emperor Shah Jahan II two days later. His remains were interred near the shrine of Sufi saint Khawaja Qutbuddin Bakhtiar Kaki at Mehrauli in Delhi.

== Ancestry ==
Ancestors of Rafi ud-Darajat

8. Muhi-ud-din Muhammad Aurangzeb, Mughal Emperor
4. Qutb-ud-din Muhammad Bahadur Shah I, Mughal Emperor
9. Nawab Bai
2. Rafi-ush-Shan
10. Mirza Sanjar
5. Nur-un-Nissa Begum
11. Zinat-i-Alam Begum
1. Rafi ud-Darajat
6. Shaikh Baqi
3.Nur-un-Nissa Begum

Rafi ud-Darajat Timurid dynasty
Preceded by Furrukhsiyar	Mughal Emperor; 1719	Succeeded by Shah Jahan II
