= Imperial and royal titles of the Mughal emperors =

The Mughal Emperors who ruled South Asia from 1526 to 1857 used titles in the Arabic, Persian and Chagatai languages. Sons of the emperors usually used the titles Shahzada and Mirza. The emperors used various titles such as Sultan, Shahanshah, Khan, Badshah, Ghazi, and various others.

== Alam Panah/Jahan Panah ==
Prince Shah Khurram, later Emperor Shah Jahan, had the full title شَاهَنْشَاه ٱلْسُّلْطَانُ ٱلْأَعْظَم وَٱلْخَاقَنُ ٱلْمُكَرَّمُ مَالِكُ ٱلْسُّلْطَنَات عَلَى حَضْرَات أَبو ٱلْمُظَفَّر شَهَابُ ٱلْدِّين مُحَمَّد شَاه جَهَان صَاحِبِ قِرَانِ ٱلْثَّانِي بادِشَاه غَازِى ظِلُّ ٱلله فِرْدَوس آشِيَانَه شَاهَنْشَاهِ سُلْطَنَاتُ ٱلْهِنْدِيَّه Shāhenshāh as-Sulṭān al-’A‘ẓam wal-Khāqān al-Mukarram, Mālik as-Sulṭānāt, ‘alá Ḥaḍrāt ’Abū l-Muẓaffar Shihāb ad-Dīn Muḥammad Shāh Jahān, Ṣāhib-i Qirān-i Thānī, Bādshāh Ghāzī Ẓillallah, Firdaws Āshiyānē, Shāhenshāh Sulṭānāt al-Hindiyyah wal-Mughaliyya

Persianized Arabic titles for the following: 1) ‘Ālam-Panāh (عَالَم پَنَاه) 'Protector of the Universe' 2) Jahān Panāh (جَهَان پَنَاه) 'Protector of the Universe'

== Al-Sultan al-Azam ==
Al-Sultan al-Azam (As-Sultwaanu-’l-’A‘azwam or (translit.) As-Sulṭānu ’l-’A‘aẓam (السُّلْطَانُ ٱلْأَعْظَمُ) is a Persianized Arabic imperial title meaning from the Arabic: "The Great or Most Mighty of Authority/ Sovereign/ Dominion". "Al - أَل" is an Arabic definite article meaning 'the', while Sultan (سُلْطَان) is a Persianized Arabic title (literally meaning Authority/ Sovereign/ Dominion) for autonomous rulers since the Abbasid era of Islamic history, while Azam (أَعْظَم), another Arabic word, means "Great or Most Mighty". The title was used by the early rulers of the Mughal Empire such as Babur, Humayun, Jahangir and Shah Jahan. The sixth emperor Aurangzeb is also reported to have held the title al-Sultan al-Azam.

== Badshah-e-Ghazi ==
Badshah-e-Ghazi/Baadshaah-e Ghaazi or (translit.) Bādshāhe-Ghāzī', literary meaning of the Perso-Arabic imperial title: "Warrior Emperor". Badshah (بادِشَاه) is a Persian title meaning "Emperor/Monarch/Ruler". Meaning the one who Conquered the Kafirs The Infidel non-Muslims. often translated as Emperor, while Ghazi (غَازِى) meant in Arabic "conqueror" or an Islamic warrior.

== Sahib-e-Qiran ==
This imperial title means "The Lord of the Auspicious Conjunction (صَاحِبِ قِرَان)" in Persianized Arabic and refers to a ruler whose horoscope features a particular conjunction of Jupiter and Saturn, portending a reign of world-conquest and justice.

Formerly adopted from the Arabic, meaning "Companion/ Associate of (the) Conjunction [literary: apparent proximity of two heavenly bodies]" - explained in the next paragraph, whereas the Arabic words: 'ṣāḥib' - صَاحِبِ' meaning "companion/ associate" and 'qirān - قِرَان' meaning "conjunction of two heavenly bodies" is the plural of 'qarn - قَرْن' (literary meaning: 'junction - a point at which two or more things are joined').

The title has a long and varied history among Islamo-Persianate rulers, beginning with the Mongols and Mamluks and further developed under the Timurids. The Mughal emperors Shah Jahan and Akbar Shah II called themselves "Sahib-e Qiran-i Sani - (Arabic: Ṣāḥibi Qirāni Thānī/ Ath-Thānī - صَاحِبِ قِرَانِ ثَانِي\ ٱلْثَانِي)", which means "The Second Lord of Auspicious Conjunction", where "sani" is the adopted Arabic word for the cardinal "(the) second/ next" ["thānī" - ثَانِي]. The first Lord of Conjunction in this formulation is assumed to have been Alexander the Great, but it simultaneously references the progenitor of the Mughals, Timur, who was most famously described as the Sahib-e Qiran by Ibn Khaldun. Timur did not use this title himself, but the court historians of his successors routinely applied this title to him and his successors.

== Shahenshah ==
The royal title Shahenshah (شاهنشاه) is a Persian word meaning the "Emperor" or "King of Kings".

== Al-Mukarram ==
Al-Mukarram (ٱلْمُكَرَّمُ) meaning the Arabic title: "Honorable or Generous". Mukarram (مُکَرَّم) means 'possessor of the honorable or generous' or 'the honorable or the generous', in Urdu adopted from Arabic. The title al-Mukarram reportedly appeared on Aurangzeb's full imperial title. Sometimes, the word al-Khaqan became a prefix for al-Mukarram in the form al-Khaqan al-Mukarram/Al-Khaaqaan Al-Mukarram or (translit.) Al-Khāqānu ’l-Mukarram (أَلْخَاقَانُ ٱلْمُكَرَّمُ). Khaqan or Khagan (خَاقَان) adopted from the Mongol ancestral roots of "khan (خَان)" meaning "leader" or "prince" - "descended" was an imperial Perso-Turkic Mongol title, used by the Mughal Emperors to show descent from the Khans.

== Zillullah (Ẓillu'llah)/ Zwillu'llah ==
Ẓillu’llah or (translit.) Zwillu’llah (ظِلُّ ٱلله) is an Arabic word-phrase meaning the Shadow or Shade of God (Allah - الله), literally "the Refuge of Allah".

== Shahenshah-e-Sultanat Al-Hindiyyah ==
Shahenshah-e-Sultanat Al-Hindiyyah or (translit.) Shāhenshāhe-Sulṭānātu ’l-Hindiyyah شَاهَنْشَاهِ سُلْطَنَاتُ ٱلْهِنْدِيَّه وَٱلْمُغَالِيَّه) is a Persianized Arabic imperial title meaning: "Emperor of the Sultanate of India". The title Sipahsalar was usually given to high-ranked Mughal generals.

== Firdaus Ashiyani ==
Firdaus Ashiyani/ Firdaws Aashiyaneh or Firdaws Āshiyānē (فِرْدَوس آشِيَانَه) is a Persianized Arabic imperial title meaning: "Domain of Paradise". "Firdaus – فِرْدَوس" for another word for "heaven" in Arabic, where the adopted English word form is "paradise" and the Persian "Ashiyaneh – آشِيَانَه" meaning "nest" or "domain". It was used for deceased emperors.
