= William Irvine (historian) =

British civil servant and historian (1840–1911)

- Born: 4 July 1840; Aberdeen, Scotland
- Died: 3 November 1911 (aged 71); Barnes, London, England
- Occupations: Civil servant, historian

William Irvine (4 July 1840 – 3 November 1911) was an administrator of the Indian Civil Service and historian, known for works on the Moghul Empire. He was in British India from 1863 to 1889.

== Life ==
Born in Aberdeen, Scotland in July 1840, he was the only son of William Irvine, an Aberdeen advocate, by his wife Margaret Garden. On the death of his father when he was a child, Irvine's mother, of an Aberdeen family but a Londoner by birth, brought him to London. He owed most of his education to his mother and grandmother. Leaving a private school before he was fifteen, he served a short apprenticeship in business, and after spending some years as a clerk in the admiralty passed for the Indian Civil Service. He landed in Calcutta late in 1863 and was posted to the North-Western Provinces. He served there as a magistrate and collector until he retired and left India in 1889. He was employed for eight years in revising the rent and revenue settlement records of the Ghazipur district.

In 1908, the Asiatic Society of Bengal made Irvine an honorary member. He was a vice-president and member of the council of the Royal Asiatic Society; he served also on the council of the Central Asian and other learned societies. He died at his house in Castelnau, Barnes, after a long illness, on 3 November 1911, and was buried in the Old Barnes cemetery.

== Works ==
Irvine's major work of scholarship was a 1907 translation and edition of a chronicle of the Venetian traveller Niccolao Manucci. After François Bernier, Manucci was the main contemporary European authority for the history of India during the reign of Aurangzeb (1658–1707). Manucci's work was known at the end of the 19th century only in a garbled French version. Over eight years, Irvine discovered a Berlin codex that gives a part of the text, and a Venice manuscript that supplies its entirety. Manucci had dictated his work in Latin, French, Italian, and Portuguese.

In India, Irvine was known as an authority on the provincial laws of rent and revenue. In 1868, while still an assistant, he published his Rent Digest, a summary of the rent law of the province. In 1879, he produced a history of the Afghan Nawabs of Fatehgarh, or Farrukhabad (Journ. Asiatic Soc. of Bengal, 1879). Upon returning to Britain, he began a history of the decline of the Mogul empire, planned as beginning from the death of Aurangzeb in 1707 to the capture of Delhi by Lord Lake in 1803. Chapters appeared in the Journal of the Asiatic Society of Bengal between 1896 and 1908. In the end, the history did not extend further than the accession of Mahomed Shah in 1719. Related papers appeared in the Journals of the Royal Asiatic Society of London and the Asiatic Society of Bengal, the Asiatic Quarterly Review, and the Indian Antiquary; and in 1903, Irvine published The Army of the Indian Moghuls: its organisation and administration.

Irvine also contributed in 1908 the chapter on Mogul history to the new Gazetteer of India. His last significant publication was a life of Aurangzeb in the Indian Antiquary for 1911; a résumé appeared the same year in the Encyclopédie d'Islam.

== Family ==
In 1872, Irvine married Teresa Anne, youngest daughter of Major Evans, and grandniece of Sir George de Lacy Evans. She died in 1901 and was buried in the same grave with her husband. They had one son, Henry, an electrical engineer in the West Indies, as well as a daughter.

== Notes ==
Attribution

This article incorporates text from a publication now in the public domain: Lee, Sidney, ed. (1912). "Irvine, William". Dictionary of National Biography (2nd supplement). Vol. 2. London: Smith, Elder & Co.
