= Siege of Gurdas Nangal =

Battle in 1715

Battle of Gurdas Nangal
- Part of Mughal–Sikh Wars
Date	1 April – 7 December 1715 (8 months and 1 week)
Location	Gurdas Nangal, Punjab
Result	Mughal victory
Territorial changes	Banda Singh Bahadur was captured alive by the Mughals.

Belligerents
Khalsa	Mughal Empire

Commanders and leaders
Banda Singh (surrendered) (POW) (executed); Baj Singh (surrendered) (POW) (executed); Binod Singh †	Farrukhsiyar; Abd al-Samad Khan; Zakariya Khan; Qamar-ud-din Khan

Strength
1,250	35,000

Casualties and losses
300 dead 750 captured	Unknown

The Battle of Gurdas Nangal took place in April 1715 between the Sikhs, led by Banda Singh Bahadur, and the Mughal Army, led by Abd al-Samad Khan.

== Background ==
Reports about the Sikhs reappearing and winning battles in Panjab kept arriving at the Delhi court, causing great worry among Emperor Farrukh Siyar and his ministers. Meanwhile, the Governor of Lahore, Abd-us-Samad Khan, did nothing about the situation. Instead, he moved south to the Lakhi Jungle to deal with a rebellion by the Bhatti Zamindars, likely to avoid clashing with Banda Singh Bahadur. On March 20, 1715, the Emperor sharply rebuked him and ordered several nobles, including Qamr-ud-Din Khan, Afrasiyab Khan, Muzaffar Khan, Raja Udet Singh Bundela, Raja Gopal Singh Bhadauriya, and many others from both Hindu and Muslim communities, to march with their forces to Punjab to reinforce Abd-us-Samad Khan's campaign against the Sikhs. The Emperor also sent orders to various local military officials in Panjab to join the effort. Responding to these commands, Mirza Ahmad Khan, the Faujdar of Gujrat, gathered a large group of armed Sayyeds; Iradatmand Khan, the Faujdar of Eminabad, Nur Muhammad Khan from Aurangabad and Shaikh Muhammad Dayam from Batala, Sayyed Hafeez Ali Khan from Haibatpur, Suhrab Khan from Kalanaur, Raja Bhim Singh from Katoch; and Har Deva, son of Raja Dhrub Deva of Jasrota, assembled their troops in Lahore. At the same time, Arif Beg Khan, the Deputy Governor of Lahore, left the city and set up camp near Shah Ganj, likely waiting for Abd-us-Samad Khan to return from the south.

Banda Singh Bahadur was well aware of the buildup in Lahore. In response, he quickly decided to construct a basic mud barrier at a small village named Kat Mirza Jan, located between Kalanaur and Batala. However, before his fortification was fully complete, a united force of local military leaders, commanded by Abd-us-Samad Khan and his deputy, Arif Beg, launched an attack on the Sikhs. According to the account in the Siyar-ul-Mutakherin, Banda Singh held his ground in a manner that amazed everyone; he fought so courageously that he nearly defeated the enemy’s main general. Although he was relentlessly chased, he managed to retreat from one position to another, much like a wild animal darting through dense woods, suffering heavy losses while also inflicting serious damage on his pursuers. Khafi Khan similarly notes that the Sikhs battled with such ferocity that they almost overwhelmed the opposing forces on several occasions. Lacking a secure defensive position, however, they eventually had no choice but to abandon their posts and withdraw to Gurdaspur.

After retreating, the Sikhs took shelter in a ruined village called Gurdas Nangal. This location lies about one mile west of today's Gurdas Nangal village, four miles west of Gurdaspur, and within about a mile of the villages Nawanpind, Parowal, Rajputan, Jattan, and Kalianpur. Because the area lacked proper fortifications, they used the enclosed compound of Bhai Duni Chand for protection. Fortunately, this enclosure had a strong, massive wall and was large enough to hold all of Banda Singh’s men. Determined to defend his people, Banda Singh worked to strengthen the defenses and gather supplies of food and ammunition. He dug a moat around the enclosure using water from a nearby canal and diverted water from the Imperial Canal, known as the Shahi Nahar, along with other small streams flowing from the hills, to create a muddy barrier that made it difficult for enemy soldiers or horses to approach. On April 17, 1715, Emperor Farrukh Siyar received reports from Delhi that Abd-us-Samad Khan had tracked the Sikhs to this new position, and that his officers were busy digging trenches and building mounds for a siege. The Emperor then instructed Itmad-ud-Daula to order Abd-us-Samad Khan to either kill or imprison the Sikh chief and his followers. When Abd-us-Samad Khan and his allies finally arrived at Gurdas Nangal, many Sikhs were out in the surrounding villages gathering supplies. A significant number of these men were captured by the Imperial troops, who were combing the countryside in search of them, and they were brought back to the camp and executed with extreme cruelty and indignity.

The Sikhs enclosure was quickly cut off by the enemy, who maintained such a tight blockade that not even a single blade of grass or kernel of corn could enter. At intervals, Abd-us-Samad Khan and his son Zakariya Khan, leading several thousand soldiers along with allied forces, tried to breach the Sikh defenses. However, these assaults were repelled by just a small number of Sikhs, whose vigorous defense left the attackers frustrated. Mohammad Qasim, writing in the service of Arif Beg Khan, described how, two or three times a day, groups of around forty or fifty Sikhs would leave the safety of their enclosure to collect grass for their cattle. When the enemy forces moved to intercept them, the Sikhs would launch a swift counterattack using arrows, muskets, and small swords before disappearing back into their shelter. The attackers were so intimidated by the Sikhs and the reputed sorcery of their chief that they even prayed for Banda Singh to flee. These daring sorties and the progress of the siege were reported to the Emperor in a letter received in Delhi on 30 April 1715. Realizing that no fewer than thirty thousand men were needed to stop the Sikhs from breaking out, Abd-us-Samad Khan welcomed the reinforcements sent by Qamr-ud-Din. When the siege line was pushed close enough for cannon fire to reach the fortress, the task of completely encircling it was divided among the commanders: Abd-us-Samad Khan took one side, Qamr-ud-Din Khan and Zakariya Khan covered two sides, while Faujdars and Zamindars secured the fourth side. To ensure a coordinated effort, their tents were pitched close together and connected by ropes, forming a continuous barrier around the fort.

== Siege ==
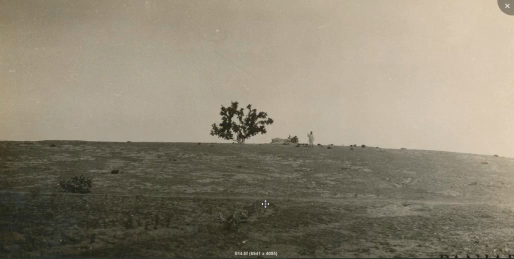
Photograph of the battlefield of Gurdas Nangal, where Banda Singh Bahadur fought his final battle against the Mughals and was arrested, taken by Dhanna Singh 'Patialvi', 1934

Abd-us-Samad Khan began setting up artillery and advancing his positions against the Sikhs. In response, the Sikhs held their ground with steadfast defense and remarkable bravery, launching a continuous barrage of projectiles into the enemy camp both day and night. They repeatedly ventured into the enemy trenches, inflicting heavy casualties.

To protect themselves and their animals, the Imperial soldiers built long earth embankments ranging from ten to twenty yards in front of each of their tents and hid behind these makeshift shields. Gradually, they sealed off all the gaps in their defenses until the entire camp was enclosed by a wall without the Sikhs even noticing. Despite these obstacles, the Sikhs repeatedly demonstrated daring by breaking through the enemy’s barriers and seizing supplies from the attackers. For instance, Baba Binod Singh would occasionally leave the safety of the enclosure to collect meat and other food from the enemy’s market, much to the astonishment of the entire camp. Every attempt to capture him failed; if the enemy kept a close watch in the morning, he would strike in the evening, and if they guarded in the evening, he would attack in the afternoon, always disappearing before they could react.

The unwavering courage of the Guru’s followers earned them even the grudging respect of their adversaries, who feared that a mass breakout might be attempted, with many sacrificing their lives to ensure their leader, Banda Singh, escaped. Moreover, the superstitious enemy troops were convinced that Banda Singh possessed magical abilities, believing he could transform into an animal like a dog or a cat. This led them to relentlessly attack any dog or cat emerging from the Sikh area, not stopping until the animal was dead. The siege and fierce clashes continued for several months, resulting in significant losses on both sides.

Slowly, the enemy managed to bring their positions closer, almost within musket-shot range of the Sikh walls. They then decided to completely encircle the Sikh area with field works. A large number of laborers and a thousand carpenters were put to work cutting down trees, while two thousand camels were used to transport wood and earth to the spot. Once the circle around the enclosure was finished, they piled up mounds of earth on the tree trunks at intervals and dug a deep, wide ditch along the base of the stockade. Even with all these obstacles in place, the Sikhs continued to launch brave attacks that caused heavy losses among their enemies. Their defense was so strong, and they fired so deadly from within, that the attackers dared not come out in the open to attack. Abd-us-Samad Khan lost all hope of success against such a determined foe, as every attempt to reach the gate and walls of the Sikh area had failed. With no other option, he ordered his men to dig tunnels underneath the enclosure's corners. This effort saw some success before Abd-us-Samad Khan’s forces could reach the main gate, Qamr-ud-Din Khan managed to capture the ditch and a small fortified tower, from which the Sikh musket fire had caused great losses.

Meanwhile, Zakariya Khan took control of a second gate, the one mostly used by the defenders. Other commanders and local officials also pushed forward, and soon the Sikhs were surrounded on all sides. The investment became so tight that it was impossible for the Sikhs to get any supplies from outside. After being confined for eight long months, their small stock of food was completely exhausted—no grain was left in their storehouse. Famine began to devastate the besieged Sikhs, and they suffered terribly. Desperate for food, they even tried to buy a small amount of gram from the enemy soldiers over the wall, paying two or three rupees per seer. However, this small amount of relief did nothing to ease their extreme hunger.

At this stage, a serious disagreement broke out between Binod Singh and Banda Singh. Some sources, such as the Mahma Prakash, claim that the discord arose because Banda Singh wanted to take a second wife—an unlikely notion given their desperate, starving condition. More plausibly, the dispute centered on a proposal during a war council to abandon their current position and revert to their old tactic of breaking through the enemy lines to reach safety. Banda Singh opposed this plan for reasons known only to him, while Binod Singh favored it. The disagreement soon escalated into a violent clash, with words giving way to the sound of clashing swords. In the heat of the fight, Kahan Singh, Binod Singh’s son, stepped in to mediate and suggested that one of the two should leave. Binod Singh accepted this decision, mounted his horse, and rode out of the besieged area, single-handedly cutting down enemy soldiers as he made his escape.

Despite settling their internal conflict, the group’s suffering from hunger only worsened. With no grain available, they were forced to convert their horses, donkeys, and other animals into food. Since they did not strictly adhere to caste rules, the Sikhs also slaughtered oxen and other livestock, sometimes eating the meat raw when there was no wood available to cook it. Many succumbed to dysentery and poisoning as the situation deteriorated. When the grass ran out, they gathered leaves from trees; and when even these were exhausted, they stripped bark, collected small shoots, dried them, and ground them to substitute for flour. In their extreme desperation, they even used crushed animal bones as a dietary supplement. There are accounts that some of them resorted to cutting flesh from their own thighs, roasting it, and eating it. Even with such harrowing conditions, the resolute Sikh leader and his followers withstood the overwhelming might of the Mughal forces for eight long months. However, the unending hunger, combined with a diet of inedible substances—raw animal flesh, grass, leaves, bark, shoots, and dried bones—gradually wrecked their bodies. The resulting severe gastrointestinal distress claimed hundreds, possibly thousands, of lives. The stench from the decaying bodies made the area uninhabitable, and the survivors were reduced to near-skeletal forms, so weak that they could barely operate their muskets. With their supplies nearly exhausted, it became virtually impossible for them to continue their defense.

On 7 December, 1715, the enemy forces captured Gurdas Nangal. By that time, the remaining Sikhs were too weak to continue defending their position. Although the attackers were initially too frightened to enter the enclosure, Abd-us-Samad Khan had promised to ask the Emperor for a pardon. However, once the gates were opened, the enemy immediately took all the Sikhs prisoner, including their leader, Banda Singh. The attackers descended on the defenseless Sikhs with savage force, much like starving wolves, and Abd-us-Samad Khan had about two or three hundred of them bound hand and foot before handing them over to the Mughal and Tartar soldiers. These soldiers then slaughtered the prisoners, filling the plain with blood. After the massacre, the bodies were torn apart in search of hidden gold coins, and their heads were gruesomely stuffed with hay and mounted on spears.

== Aftermath ==
On December 22, 1715, news of the capture of Banda Singh Bahadur was sent by Abd al-Samad Khan to Emperor Farrukh Siyar in Delhi. Banda Singh and his followers were captured alive and later taken to Delhi, where they were executed in 1716 under the orders of Mughal Emperor Farrukhsiyar after refusing to convert to Islam. Along with them, a large number of Sikhs, who had been rounded up by the Mughal Army from villages and towns during the march back to Delhi, were also executed.

Articles recovered from the enclosure
Item	Quantity
Swords	1000
Shields	278
Small Kirpans	217
Matchlocks	180
Bows and Quivers	173
Daggers	114
Silver Rupees	600
Gold Mohars	23
Gold Ornaments	11
