= Abd al-Samad Khan =

Political and military leader in the Mughal Empire

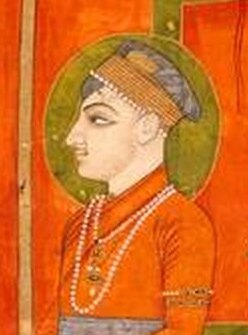
- Detail of Abd al-Samad Khān, from a painting of him being received by emperor Jahāndār Shah

Subahdar of Lahore
- In office 1713–1726
- Preceded by: Izzat Khān
- Succeeded by: Zakariyyā Khān

Governor of Multan
- In office 1726–1737
- Preceded by: ?
- Succeeded by: Zakariyyā Khān

Personal details
- Born: Abd al-Samad Khān; 1670s Samarqand
- Died: 1737 Lahore, Mughal Empire
- Children: Zakariyyā Khān; Sharaf-un-Nisa
- Military career
- Allegiance: Mughal Empire
- Branch: Mughal Army
- Rank: Subahdar, General
- Conflicts: Deccan War; Mughal–Sikh Wars; Battle of Lohgarh (1713); Siege of Gurdas Nangal

Abd al-Samad Khan Al-Ansari or Abd-us-Samad Khan Al-Ansari (died 1737), also known simply as Abdus Samad Khan, was the Mughal subahdar of Lahore Subah from 1713 to 1726, and of Multan Subah from 1726 until his death in 1737. He was succeeded by his son Zakariya Khan Bahadur in both the provinces.

== Early life ==
Abdus Samad Khan was born in Samarqand. His father, Abdullah Ahrar, was a well-known Naqshbandi saint and a descendant of Khwaja Ahrar of Baghdad, while his mother came from the family of Shaikh Umar of Baghistan. Originally, the family lived in Tashkand before settling in Samarqand, where they remained until Abdullah Ahrar died on 20 February 1690.

Searching for better prospects, Abdus Samad Khan left his homeland and moved to India. During Emperor Aurangzeb’s reign, he found work in the Deccan region, though he did not achieve any notable success there. His fortunes began to change under Emperor Bahadur Shah I. A significant turning point came when he married into the family of Muhammad Amin Khan Chin, which helped him forge important connections. However, as Bahadur Shah’s reign neared its end, Abdus Samad Khan boldly pressed his claim on the influential Prince Azim-us-Shan. The prince, who held great power at court, responded evasively, and Abdus Samad Khan, having lost his temper, spoke in a disrespectful manner. This behavior led Emperor Bahadur Shah to expel him from the imperial court and order him to undertake a forced pilgrimage to Mecca.

Just as Abdus Samad Khan was preparing for the pilgrimage, events took a dramatic turn. With Bahadur Shah’s death, a fierce contest for the throne erupted. Recognizing his proven bravery and the recent conflict with Prince Azim-us-Shan—which had made him even more suitable for the upcoming struggle—Zulfiqar Khan called him back into service. He was promoted to a high military rank (commanding 7000 soldiers) and entrusted with leading the vanguard for Jahandhar Shah.

Abdus Samad Khan’s military prowess shone on 14 March 1712. In just two days, he efficiently set up artillery batteries, and his rapid, accurate firing kept Azim-us-Shan’s forces from attacking aggressively on three fronts. On the following day, 15 March 1712, his well-prepared batteries played a decisive role in shifting the battle in favor of Jahandhar Shah’s forces. At one point, heavy enemy fire forced opposing commanders, including Kokaltash and Zain Khan, to abandon their positions and retreat behind the walls.

At this critical moment, Shah Nawaz Khan led a force of 2,000 cavalry in a vigorous attack. Despite the enemy's surge, Abdus Samad Khan, together with Zain Khan, mounted a determined defense just as his allies were nearing defeat. The timely arrival of reinforcements under Prince Jahandhar Khan ultimately forced the enemy to flee. Through his steadfast bravery and calm persistence, Abdus Samad Khan played a key role in saving the situation on the battlefield.

== Governor of Lahore ==
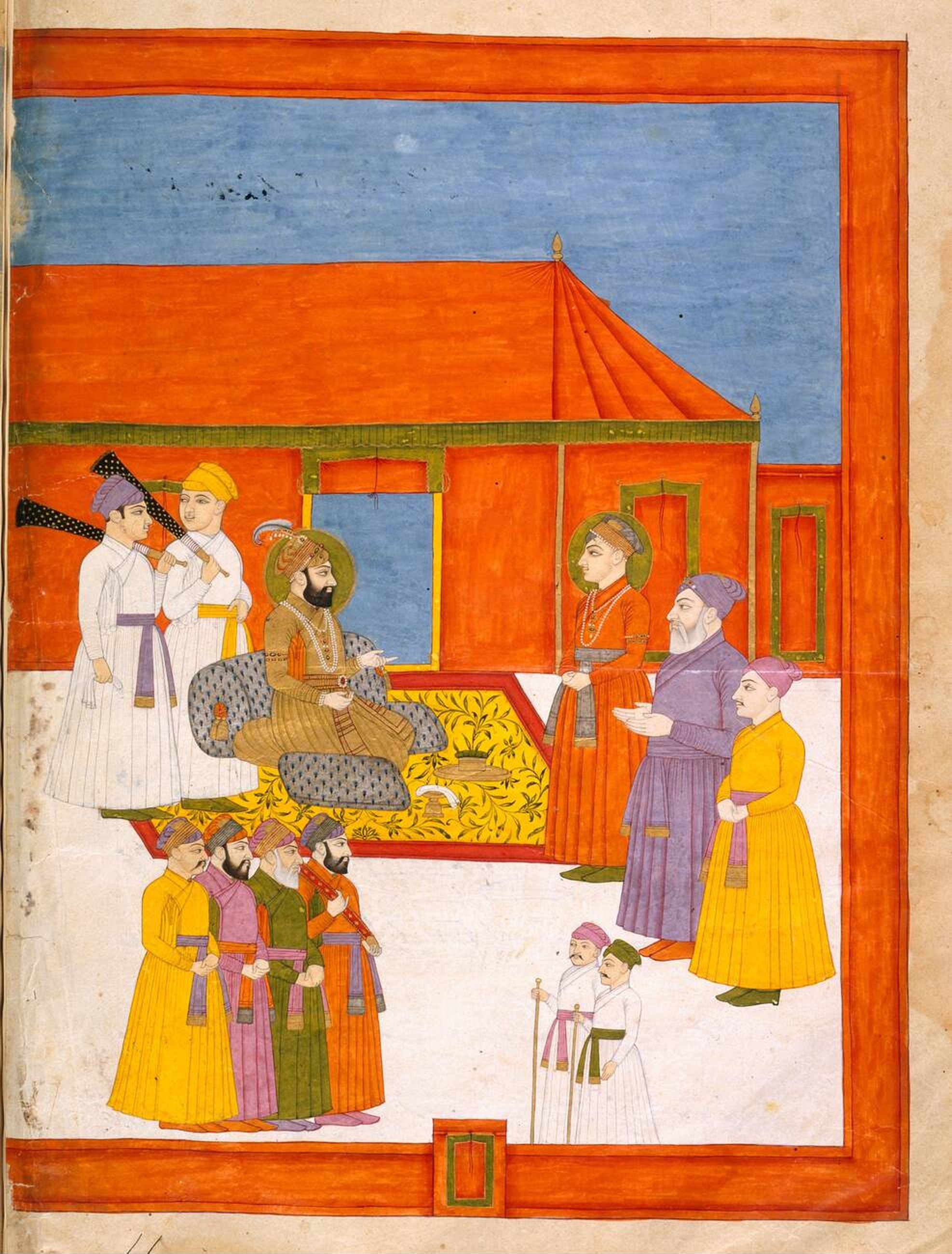
Abdus Samad Khan being received by Mughal emperor Jahandar Shah (1712–13), Punjab, late 18th century

He was appointed by the Mughal emperor Farrukhsiyar.

=== Campaign against Banda Singh Bahadur ===
To subdue the uprising led by Banda Singh Bahadur, on 22 February 1713, Farrukhsiyar made key appointments. He appointed Abdus Samad Khan as the new Governor of Lahore, and at the same time, his son Zakariya Khan was assigned as the Faujdar of Jammu. Before setting off, the Emperor ordered Abd‑us‑Samad Khan to either drive Banda Singh Bahadur out of Sadhaura or, if possible, wipe him out completely.

When Abd‑us‑Samad Khan reached Sadhaura, he found that the siege initiated by Zain‑ud‑din Ahmed had hardly progressed. Banda Singh Bahadur had taken control of the fort at Lohgarh, while his men defended Sadhaura. Realizing that he could not attack both places at once, Abd‑us‑Samad Khan decided it would be best to tackle them one after the other.

On 28 June 1713, a large Mughal force—led by Abd‑us‑Samad Khan, Zain‑ud‑din Ahmed Khan, and other commanders such as Inam Khan and Baqa Beg Khan, along with countless local militia—completely surrounded the fort at Sadhaura. Seeing that the Sikh defenders were close to running out of food, Banda Singh Bahadur began sending relief groups from Lohgarh almost every day. However, on 2 July 1713, one such Sikh detachment was intercepted by an imperial unit. A fierce battle ensued in which many Sikhs were killed or injured, and several prominent Mughal commanders, including Baqa Beg Khan, his brother Inam Khan, and others, fell on the battlefield. The loss of these high-ranking officers created fear among the Mughal troops. In a council meeting, the officers agreed to prepare a surprise attack on a weak side of the fortress. They dug trenches near Sadhaura and readied ladders made from seven hundred wooden steps—but they avoided launching the assault during the rainy season.

Despite the tightening siege—with Abd‑us‑Samad Khan and Zain‑ud‑din Ahmed Khan positioned on opposite sides and other forces guarding the remaining flanks—the Sikhs held on to Sadhaura stubbornly. In an effort to unsettle the defenders, Banda Singh Bahadur sent small groups from Lohgarh to launch surprise attacks. However, as soon as these groups appeared, the besiegers from all sides counterattacked, causing the relief attempts to fail while the Sikhs’ supplies began to dwindle. Eventually, with their food and munitions nearly exhausted, the Sikhs in Sadhaura had no choice but to leave the fort and retreat to the stronger position at Lohgarh. In the first week of October 1713, they mounted a determined counterattack against the local Zamindari militia. Although the hired soldiers struggled against the fearless Khalsa fighters, the Sikhs managed to break through the enemy lines and withdraw with few losses. Later, the Mughal forces reported their victory and the capture of Sadhaura to the Emperor, who was pleased with the news. In recognition, the Subedar received an imperial decree and a special royal robe (Khilat).

After the fort was evacuated, Abd‑us‑Samad Khan and Zain‑ud‑din Ahmed Khan pursued the retreating Sikhs to the fort at Lohgarh. Realizing they could not stand against the large imperial army, Banda Singh Bahadur put his escape plan into action. Once his supporters from Sadhaura joined him, he fled into the hills and soon disappeared from view. The Mughal forces delayed their chase for a few days, fearing a counterattack, and a later search through the hills found no trace of the Sikhs.

The news of Sadhaura’s fall and the escape of Banda Singh Bahadur and his men reached the Emperor in Delhi on 9 October 1713. On 13 December 1713, Zakariya Khan reported that after the fortress was captured, 900 Sikh heads had been taken and displayed on spears in the Chandni Chowk Bazaar—a sight witnessed by the Emperor. For his role, Zakariya Khan was honored with a royal robe, a ceremonial staff (jigah), a banner, later a drum, and an extra military rank of one hundred Sawar.

A few months afterward, Abd‑us‑Samad Khan himself arrived in Delhi after an expedition to Multan. He was warmly received; on 6 March 1714, he was presented to the Emperor and given the customary gifts. Then, on 10 March 1714, he received a dress of honor (Khilat), headgear (sarpech), a jeweled sword, a horse, and even an elephant before being sent with the army toward Rajputana. On 26 June 1714, Abd‑us‑Samad Khan and his son Zakariya Khan returned from Rajputana to Delhi. Two nobles were then sent to Punjab with orders to punish the Sikhs further. Abd‑us‑Samad Khan later returned to Lahore on 26 August 1714, and reports soon came in that about 7,000 Sikhs had attacked Ropar. The deputy commander under Zain‑ud‑din Ahmed Khan from Sarhind organized a strong defense, and around 200 Sikhs were killed, forcing the survivors to retreat.

Two months after Abd‑us‑Samad Khan left Delhi to return to his government seat in Lahore, news arrived from Sirhind on the 16th Sha'ban, 1126 (26 August 1714). It was reported that about 7,000 Sikhs had attacked Rupar, a town on the left bank of the river Satluj. Khairja Mukaaram, the deputy of Zain‑ud‑Din Ahmad Khan of Sirhind, came out to confront them and is said to have defended the town well. In the ensuing battle, roughly 200 Sikhs were killed, and the rest were forced to retreat.

In early 1715, when word of Sikh victories and advances in Punjab reached Delhi, Emperor Farrukh Siyar was deeply alarmed and mobilized a massive Mughal force. Over 20,000 troops under Qamar-ud-din Khan were dispatched from Delhi, with an additional 5,000 men from Sirhind. Orders were issued to Abd al-Samad Khan and his son Zakariya Khan to capture the Sikh leader Banda Singh alive. Despite commanding about 14,000 fighters, Banda Singh found himself cornered as the Mughal forces converged from every direction. Unable to reach the large, well-stocked fort at Gurdaspur, built to house up to 60,000 soldiers, he moved westward to take refuge in a fortified mansion at the village of Gurdas Nangal, about six kilometers from Gurdaspur, where he sheltered roughly 1,250 men and a few horses. The Mughal army quickly encircled this compound by digging deep trenches, setting up artillery batteries, and blocking any possible escape or resupply routes. Over the next eight grueling months—spanning a sweltering summer, a heavy monsoon, and a cold early winter—the defenders endured constant skirmishes and suffered severe shortages of food and fodder. Small groups of Sikhs repeatedly ventured out to gather what little supplies they could, but the siege gradually tightened until starvation and desperation took their toll. Finally, on 7 December 1715, the Mughal forces breached the defenses, ruthlessly killed many of the near-starved Sikhs, and captured Banda Singh along with his remaining 740 followers. On 22 December 1715, news of the capture of Banda Singh Bahadur was sent by Abd al-Samad Khan to Emperor Farrukh Siyar in Delhi.

After being taken from Gurdas Nangal, Banda Singh Bahadur and the other Sikh prisoners were brought to Lahore. Even though he had been captured and jailed, his enemies still feared his supposed supernatural powers so much that they were constantly worried he might escape while on the road. In response, one Mughal officer volunteered to be tied to the same elephant, declaring, "If he tries to escape, I will plunge my dagger into him."

Banda Singh was heavily restrained: his feet were bound, a ring was placed around his neck, and a chain was fastened around his back—all connected by thick, wooden beams. He was then thrown into an iron cage and chained to it in four places. Additionally, two Mughal officers were tied on each side of him on the same elephant to guard against any escape attempt.

The Mughal officers and their senior men, dressed in tattered uniforms and riding on old, exhausted donkeys with paper hats, led the procession. They were followed by camels, drummers, and trumpeters, along with Mughals carrying the severed heads of Sikhs on spears. Behind the prisoners marched the royal Amirs, Faujdars, and Hindu rulers at the head of their troops. For miles along the Shahi Sarak, or Royal Road, eager spectators lined both sides. The markets, streets, and rooftops of nearby houses offered a grisly view of what appeared to be a surging sea of human heads. With this dreadful procession of half-dead prisoners and bleeding heads, Abd‑us‑Samad Khan entered the city of Lahore. Later, Abd‑us‑Samad Khan asked for permission to travel to Delhi in person with his prized prisoner, but he was ordered to remain and manage his province. Instead, Banda Singh Bahadur and the other Sikh prisoners were placed in the charge of his son, Zakariya Khan, and Qamr‑ud‑Din Khan.

After being captured at Gurdas Nangal, Banda Singh Bahadur and his fellow Sikh prisoners were escorted to Lahore. Despite his imprisonment, his foes remained terrified of his alleged mystical abilities, constantly fearing that he might escape along the way. In fact, one Mughal officer boldly offered to be fastened to the same elephant, proclaiming, "If he dares to flee, I'll thrust my dagger into him."

Banda Singh was secured with extreme measures: his legs were tied, a ring fastened around his neck, and a chain attached to his back—all connected by thick wooden beams. He was then thrown into an iron cage and locked in place at four points. Moreover, two Mughal officers were tied on each side of him on the same elephant to ensure he could not escape.

The procession was led by Mughal officers and senior commanders, who wore ragged uniforms and rode on old, weary donkeys adorned with paper caps. They were followed by camels, drummers, and trumpeters, while additional Mughals carried severed Sikh heads on spears. At the forefront of the crowd marched the royal Amirs, Faujdars, and Hindu rulers leading their own troops. For miles along the Shahi Sarak (Royal Road), curious onlookers lined both sides, and the local markets, streets, and rooftops offered a ghastly spectacle of what seemed to be a relentless tide of human heads. With this horrifying procession of nearly lifeless prisoners and bleeding severed heads, Abd‑us‑Samad Khan entered Lahore. Later, Abd‑us‑Samad Khan sought permission to personally travel to Delhi with his prized captive. However, he was instructed to remain in his province and manage its affairs. Consequently, Banda Singh Bahadur and the other Sikh prisoners were entrusted to the custody of his son, Zakariya Khan, and Qamr‑ud‑Din Khan.

=== Abdus Samad Khan and the Imperial Suppression of the Sikhs ===
After capturing Banda Singh Bahadur, Emperor Farrukh Siyar rewarded Abdus Samad Khan with high honors. He was granted a mansab of 6,000 and received valuable gifts—including a bedecked polki, elephants, horses, gold ornaments, jewels for the turban, upper garments, a pearl necklace, and several parganas in the Panjab as jagir.Following this reward, the Emperor issued a general edict directed at suppressing the Sikh community. The decree mandated that any Sikh encountered was to be immediately arrested and given only two options: convert to Islam or face execution. This order was applied throughout the empire without delay.

The provincial governors of Sirhind, Lahore, and Jammu competed in enforcing these harsh measures to gain the Emperor’s favor. Abdus Samad Khan was specifically entrusted with supervising this persecution. Under his direction, local village headmen were required to sign written undertakings ensuring that no Sikh was allowed to live in their area. If any Sikhs were found, they were to be arrested and handed over to the local authorities. In cases where they could not be captured, their presence had to be reported to government officials.

Additionally, a system of rewards was established to incentivize the capture of Sikhs. Monetary prizes were offered—for example, Rs. 10 for reporting the presence of a Sikh, Rs. 20 for identifying one, Rs. 40 for aiding in his capture, and Rs. 80 for delivering his head. These measures contributed to the systematic persecution that led to widespread displacement, suffering, and the near-erasure of Sikh presence from the plains of the Punjab during that period.

== Later life and death ==
For a few years, Abdus Samad Khan successfully maintained law and order—lawlessness dwindled, agriculture thrived, and trade flourished—until he relaxed his strict measures, which emboldened the Sikhs to resume their rebellious activities. According to Kanhiyalal, these Sikhs grew daring enough to launch daylight raids on towns and cities, quickly looting shops, seizing bundles of clothes from washermen by rivers or wells, and stealing cattle and horses to secure food and clothing, all while evading pursuit. As mounting complaints reached the capital over his failure to restore complete order, Emperor Farrukh Siyar issued stern warnings to Abdus Samad Khan. Meanwhile, a rift developed between him and his son, Zakariya Khan, who had governed Jammu (1713–1720) and Kashmir (1720–1726) and was connected by marriage to Nawab Qamar-ud-din Khan, the Prime Minister of Muhammad Shah. Supported by Qarnar-ud-din Khan, Zakariya Khan petitioned the Emperor to assume control of the Punjab, promising the swift restoration of peace. In response, the Emperor divided the province into Lahore and Multan, awarding Lahore—with the title Khan Bahadur—to Zakariya Khan while transferring Abdus Samad Khan to Multan, where he eventually died in 1737; subsequently, Multan also came under Zakariya Khan’s jurisdiction.

== See also ==
- Farrukhsiyar
- Massa Ranghar
