= Tara Singh Wan =

Sikh martyr

Bhai Tara Singh Wan
- Tara Singh Wan striking Sahib Rai
- Born: Tara Singh; 1687; Wan, Tarn Taran district, Punjab
- Died: 30 March 1726 (aged 38–39); Wan, Tarn Taran district, Punjab
- Cause of death: Killed in Action
- Other name: Bhai Tara Singh
- Known for: Sikh Martyr

Tara Singh Wan (1687–30 March 1726) was an eighteenth-century Sikh martyr. He was from the village of Wan, also known as Wan Tara Singh and Dall-Wan now in Tarn Taran district tehsil Bhikhiwind of the Eastern Punjab. After humbling the faujdar of Patti, he was killed while resisting a Mughal army dispatched by Zakaria Khan. Thus, Tara Singh was part of one of the first recorded Sikh military actions in the post-Banda Singh Bahadur period. He is remembered by Sikhs as one of their notable martyrs of the 18th century.

== Family background ==
His father, Gurdas Singh, had received the rites of the Khalsa in the time of Guru Gobind Singh Sahib, and had taken part in the Battle of Amritsar (6 April 1709), in which Bhai Mani Singh led the Sikhs and in which Har Sahai, a revenue official of Patti, was killed at his (Gurdas Singh's) hands. Baba Gurdas Singh took martyrdom in Bajwara (Hoshiarpur) when he went along with Baba Banda Singh to fight for Sirhind. Baba Gurdas Singh was married in next village of Rajoke.

== Early life ==
Bhai Tara Singh, the eldest of the five sons of Gurdas Singh, was born around 1687. He took Amrit from Bhai Mani Singh. Receiving the rites of initiation, he grew up to be a devout Sikh, skilled in the martial arts.

== Martyrdom ==
As persistent persecution drove the Sikhs out of their homes to seek shelter in hills and forests, Tara Singh collected around him a band of desperadoes and lived defiantly at Wan, where he, according to Ratan Singh Bhangu's Pracheen Panth Prakash, possessed jagir landgrant. In his vaar or enclosure made with thick piles of dried branches of thorny trees, he gave refuge to any Sikh who came to him to escape persecution. The faujdar sent a contingent of 25 horse and 80 foot to Wan but Tara Singh's colleague sardar met them in the fields, fought back and routed the invaders with several dead, including their commander, nephew of the faujdar and got martyrdom himself. Ja'far Begh reported the matter to Subahdar (Governor) Zakariya Khan, who sent a punitive expedition consisting of 2,000 horse, 5 elephants, 40 light camel guns and 4 cannononwheels under his deputy, Momin Khan. Tara Singh had barely 22 men with him at that time. They kept the Lahore force at bay through the night but were killed to a man in the handtohand fight on the following day 1726.
