= Zakariya Khan Bahadur =

Governor of Lahore during the Mughal Empire

Zakariyyā Khān زکریا خان Bahadur
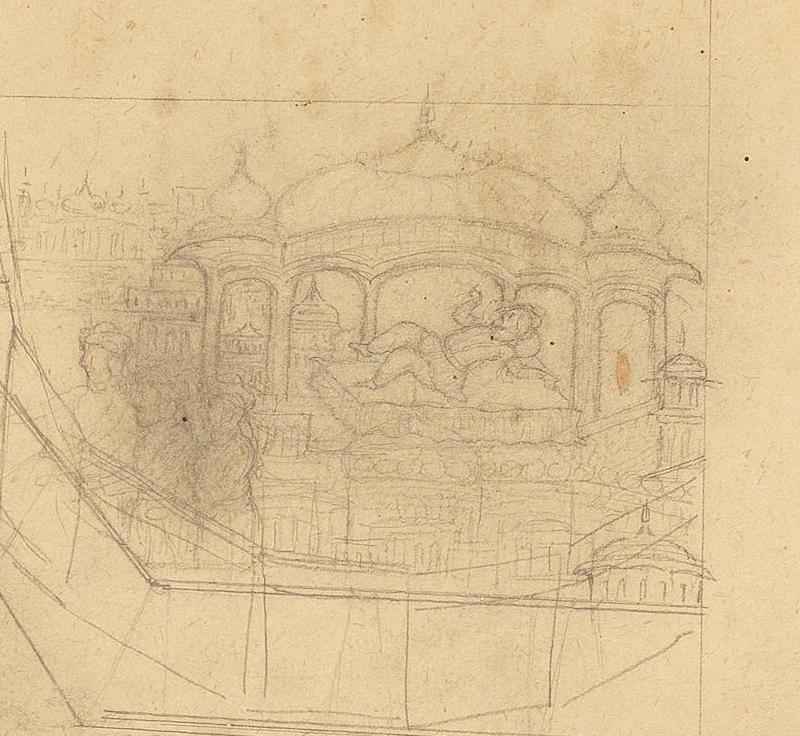
- Detail of Zakariya Khan Bahadur leisuring from a 19th century Sikh drawing

Governor of Lahore
- In office 1726 – 1 July 1745
- Monarch: Muhammad Shāh
- Preceded by: Abd al-Samād Khān
- Succeeded by: Yahyā Khān

Governor of Multan
- In office 1737 – 1 July 1745
- Preceded by: Abd al-Samād Khān
- Succeeded by: Yahya Khan

Personal details
- Died: 1 July 1745 Lahore Subah
- Children: Yahya Khan; Shāh Nawāz Khān; Mir Baqi
- Parent: Abd al-Samād Khān (father)

Military service
- Allegiance: Mughal Empire
- Branch/service: Mughal Army
- Battles/wars: Siege of Gurdāspūr (1715); Battle of Gurdās Nangal (1715); Mughal-Afsharid war (1738)

Zakariya Khan (died 1 July 1745), alternatively spelt as Zakaria Khan, was the Mughal subahdar of the Lahore and Multan subahs from 1726 till his death in 1745, succeeding his father, Abd al-Samad Khan, at both the posts. He continued and extended his father's policy of severe persecution of Sikhs, and thousands of Sikhs were killed during his period and post his death, especially during the Chhota Ghallughara.

== Early life ==
Zakaria Khan was a descendant of Khwaja Ahrar on his paternal side with origins in modern day Tashkent, his mother was probably from the Ansari family of Panipat.

== Administrative career ==
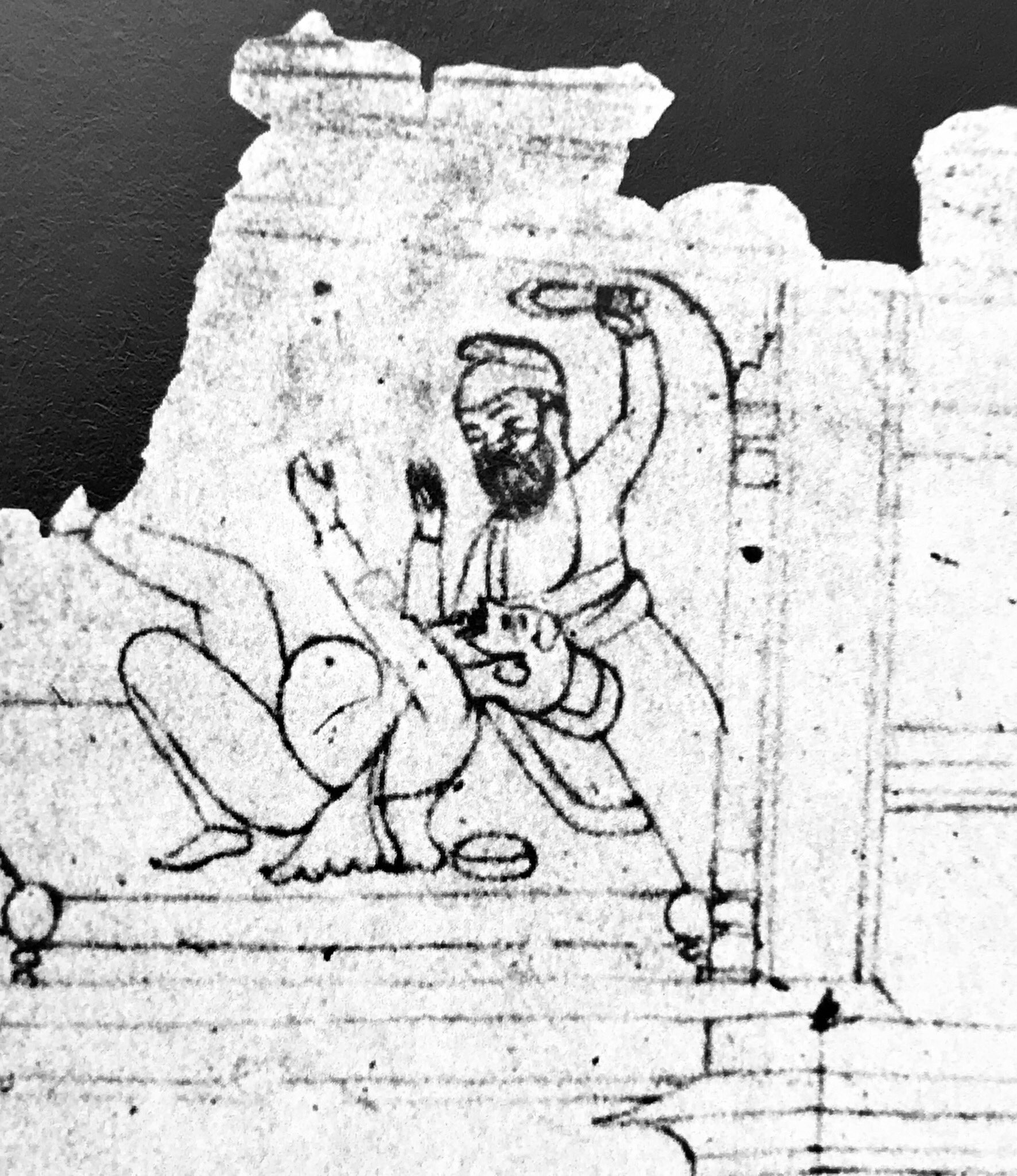
Zakariya Khan Bahadur being hit by a Singh's shoe, detail from a 19th century Sikh drawing

Zakriya Khan was given control of Lahore by Persian Emperor Nader Shah during his invasion of the Mughal Empire in 1738 in return for annual tribute payments to the Persian crown.

=== Persecution of Sikhs ===
He continued the persecution of Sikhs and dispatched his army commander Salabat Khan to block off Amritsar and not allow Sikhs to worship there. Zakaria Khan condemned the Hindu religious martyr, Haqiqat Rai, to death. Zakaria Khan also dispatched a Mughal force that ended up killing Tara Singh Wan.

In the early 1730s, Zakaria Khan attempted to broker peace with the Sikh rebels by offering a nawabship, jagir grant, and robe-of-honour from the Mughal emperor to the chosen leader of the Sikhs, with Kapur Singh being selected to receive this. However, Sikh-Mughal relations soon broke down once again and Zakaria Khan continued his anti-Sikh policies with a greater level of intensity.

According to prominent early Sikh historian Ratan Singh Bhangu, in response to having his scalp torn off, Bhai Taru Singh cursed Zakaria Khan, saying he would be killed by his shoes. According to Sikh sources, after cutting Bhai Taru Singh's scalp, Zakaria Khan was stricken with unbearable pain and the inability to urinate. As a last resort, Khan sent an apology to the Khalsa Panth for his persecution of Sikhs and begged for forgiveness. It was suggested that if Khan hit himself with Singh's shoes, his condition might be cured. Although it would cure Khan of his condition, he died 22 days later from having hit himself with the shoes, just as Singh predicted.

== Death and successor ==
Zakariya Khan died in 1745 and was survived by three sons: Yahya Khan, Hayatullah Khan, and Mir Baqi. Yahya Khan and Hayatullah Khan were at the imperial court at the time of the father's death whilst Mir Momin and Nimmat Khan were away on an expedition against the Hill States. Yahya Khan eventually became an ascetic. Hayatullah Khan, who was entitled Shah Nawaz Khan, died in a battle against Mir Mannu, son of Qamruddin Khan, the grand vizier. His third son, Mir Baqi, migrated to the Deccan and took up service in Nizam ul Mulk Asaf Jah I's court, and he was given the title Izz-ud-Dawlah Hizbar Jang.

The commander Salabat Khan was killed in an encounter with Jassa Singh Ahluwalia and the Sikhs liberated Amritsar in March 1748.

== In popular culture ==
=== Film and television ===
Zakariya Khan is portrayed by:

- Shaikh Sami in the DD National series Maharaja Ranjit Singh
- Avtar Gill in the 2023 film Mastaney

== See also ==
- Farrukhsiyar
- Massa Ranghar
- Jaspat Rai
