= Tripolia Gate =

Historic arch in Rajasthan, India

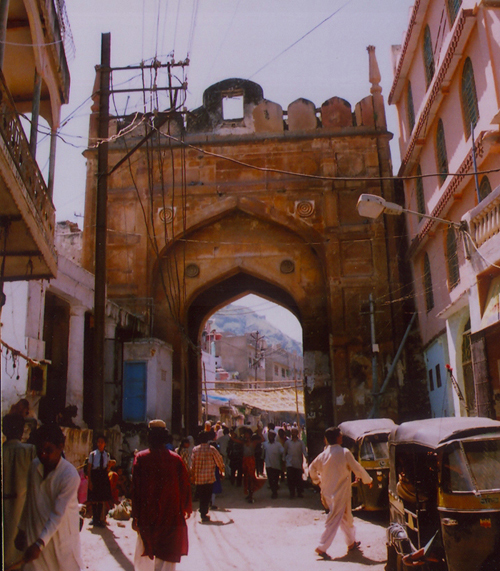
- Interactive map of Tripolia Gate
- Location: Ajmer, Rajasthan, India

History
- Built: 1570 AD
- Built for: Mughal Royal Family

Site notes
- Architectural style: Islamic
- Restored by: Archaeological Survey of India
- Governing body: Archaeological Survey of India

Tripolia Gate is a massive arched gateway in west Ajmer, having a pillared hall in the left side which was to be used by the guards. The gate was constructed by Emperor Akbar of the Mughal Empire in 1570 AD. The monument is under the Archaeological Survey of India.

== See also ==
- Tripolia Gates
