= Indira Kanwar =

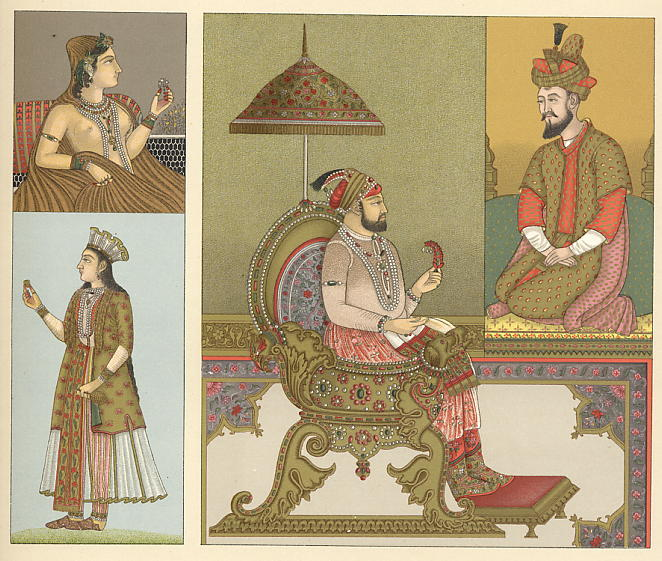
- Depiction of women of the court of Farrukhsiyar, possibly including Indira.

Maharajkumari of Marwar
- Born: c. 1696; Jodhpur, Marwar
- Died: 1763 (aged 66–67); Jodhpur, Marwar
- Spouse: Farrukhsiyar (m. 1715; d. 1719)
Names
- Shri Indira Kanwar Baiji Lall Sahiba
- House: Rathore
- Father: Raja Ajit Singh
- Mother: Udot Kanwarji
- Religion: Hinduism

Indira Kanwar (c. 1696 – 1763) was the second wife of Emperor Farrukhsiyar, married in a grand ceremony. She returned to Jodhpur and her father's household after her husband was executed by the Sayyid brothers and her father Ajit Singh of Marwar, during an imperial power struggle after which Rafi ud-Darajat was crowned emperor by Ajit Singh and Jai Singh II of Amber. Rafi was a puppet under the Sayyids.

She was the daughter of Raja Ajit Singh and Rani Udot Kanwarji, the daughter of Maharaj Shri Gaj Singh Sahib. She was the sister of Bakht Singh and Abhai Singh, the next rulers of Jodhpur State.

== Marriage ==
When Ajit Singh, Maharaja of Marwar was moved from Subedari (governorship) of Gujarat Subah to Thatta Subah, he refused and returned to Marwar and captured Ajmer. Husain Ali Khan, one of the Sayyid brothers was sent against him but the emperor Farrukhsiyar, who was in a power struggle against them and who were trying to control him, secretly encouraged Ajit Singh to resist the imperial troops and if he won he would be rewarded. Ajit Singh withdrew against Hussain Ali Khan's force and made an agreement with him, in which Ajit Singh was returned to the Subedari of Gujarat, his son Abhay Singh sent to the imperial court and his daughter Indira Kanwar married Farrukhsiyar, who became his second wife in 1715. They had no children. She came back to Jodhpur after the Sayyid brothers and her father had Farrukhsiyar blinded and executed in 1719.

== Ancestry ==
Ancestors of Indira Kanwar

16. Sur Singh, Raja of Marwar
8. Gaj Singh, Raja of Marwar
17. Sobha Devij
4. Jaswant Singh, Raja of Marwar
18. Bhan Saktavat
9. Pratap Devi
2. Ajit Singh, Raja of Marwar
20. Tulsi Pal, Maharaja of Karauli
10. ?
5. Rani Jadamanji
1. Indira Kanwar
24. Jagat Singh I, Maharana of Mewar
12. Raj Singh I, Maharana of Mewar
6. Gaj Singh
3. Udot Kanwarji
