= Battle of Amritsar (1709) =

- Part of Mughal-Sikh Wars
Date	6 and 12 April 1709
Location	Amritsar
Result	Sikh victory

Belligerents
Khalsa (Sikhs)	Mughal Empire

Commanders and leaders
Bhai Mani Singh; Bhai Tara Singh Wan; Bhai Karan Singh †	Aslam Khan; Diwan Har Sahai †; Chaudary Deva Jatt

Strength
Unknown	Unknown

Casualties and losses
Unknown	Unknown

The Battle of Amritsar was fought on 6 and 12 April 1709 between the Sikh forces led by Bhai Mani Singh and the Mughal forces sent by Aslam Khan, the Governor of Lahore. This battle was the first one fought after Guru Gobind Singh's death, even before Banda Singh Bahadur's skirmishes against the Mughals. This battle can also be referred to as The Unsung Battle of Amritsar.

== Background ==
On 29 March 1709 during Vaisakhi, the Sikhs held a gathering at Amritsar. Chuhar Mall Ohri, a Khatri, had a son named Ramu Mall. A dispute between the Sikhs and Ramu Mall arose on the issue of some mulberry trees. Ramu got so angry that he started cussing on Guru Granth Sahib. This made the Sikhs enraged and they gave Ramu a beating. Upon learning about this Chuhar Mall was infuriated. Bhai Mani Singh tried to pacify him but he was so aggressive that he announced his attention to expel Sikhs from Amritsar. Chuhar asked Aslam Khan, who asked Har Sahai, the chief of Patti, to attack Amritsar. A few days later a large army set up camp outside the Golden Temple hoisting the Mughal flag. From Lahore, carts full of bullets and gunpowder had arrived.

== Battle ==
Learning about the invasion of Har Sahai, the Sikhs were prepared for a battle. A battle was fought on the 6th of April. Many Sayyids and Brahmins were killed in action. Har Sahai was killed by Bhai Tara Singh Wan. Then Aslam Khan sent Chaudary Deva Jatt with men and munitions of war from Lahore to march against the Sikhs. On April 12, the Sikhs defeated this army. Chaudary Deva Jatt fled the battle.

== Aftermath ==
When Aslam Khan learned about the defeat, he was in tears. Aslam sent a note to the Mughal Emperor requesting to attack Amritsar again. Bahadur Shah I wrote a letter to Aslam saying "Have you lost your mind! The House of Nanak is eternal; you have raised your sword against it." The Sikhs were also rich in a lot of ammunition and other valuable items for war.

== See also ==
- Nihang
- Martyrdom and Sikhism
