= Nawanpind =

- Village
- Location in Punjab, India Nawanpind (India)
- Coordinates: 31.398257°N 75.335388°E
- Country: India
- State: Punjab
- District: Kapurthala

Government
  - Type: Panchayati raj (India)
  - Body: Gram panchayat

Population (2011)
  - Total: 928
- Sex ratio 477/451♂/♀

Languages
  - Official: Punjabi
  - Other spoken: Hindi
- Time zone: UTC+5:30 (IST)
- PIN: 144601
- Telephone code: 01822
- ISO 3166 code: IN-PB
- Vehicle registration: PB-09
- Website: kapurthala.gov.in

Nawanpind is a village in Kapurthala district of Punjab State, India. It is located 4 kilometres (2.5 mi) from Kapurthala, which is both district and sub-district headquarters of Nawanpind. The village is administrated by a Sarpanch, who is an elected representative.

== Demography ==
According to the report published by Census India in 2011, Nawanpind has total number of 187 houses and population of 928 of which include 477 males and 451 females. Literacy rate of Nawanpind is 82.47%, higher than state average of 75.84%. The population of children under the age of 6 years is 101 which is 10.88% of total population of Nawanpind, and child sex ratio is approximately 980, higher than state average of 846.

== Population data ==
Particulars	Total	Male	Female
Total No. of Houses	187	-	-
Population	928	477	451
Child (0-6)	101	51	50
Schedule Caste	249	130	119
Schedule Tribe	0	0	0
Literacy	82.47 %	85.21 %	79.55 %
Total Workers	273	241	32
Main Worker	263	0	0
Marginal Worker	10	6	4

== Air travel connectivity ==
The closest airport to the village is Sri Guru Ram Dass Jee International Airport.
