= Tripolia Gates =

The Tripolia Gates are two historical gateways of similar form located at GT Karnal Road, Delhi. These are triple passage gateways situated 250 meters apart in the area between Rana Pratap Bagh and Gur Mandi in North Delhi. These structures were made by Nazir Mahaldar Khan, superintendent of women's quarter in the palace of Mughal emperor Muhammed Shah during the period 1728–29 as entrances towards a market from both ends. Out of these two gates, northern gate is restored and the southern gate is still under restoration.

== See also ==
- Tripolia Gate (Ajmer)

== Gallery ==
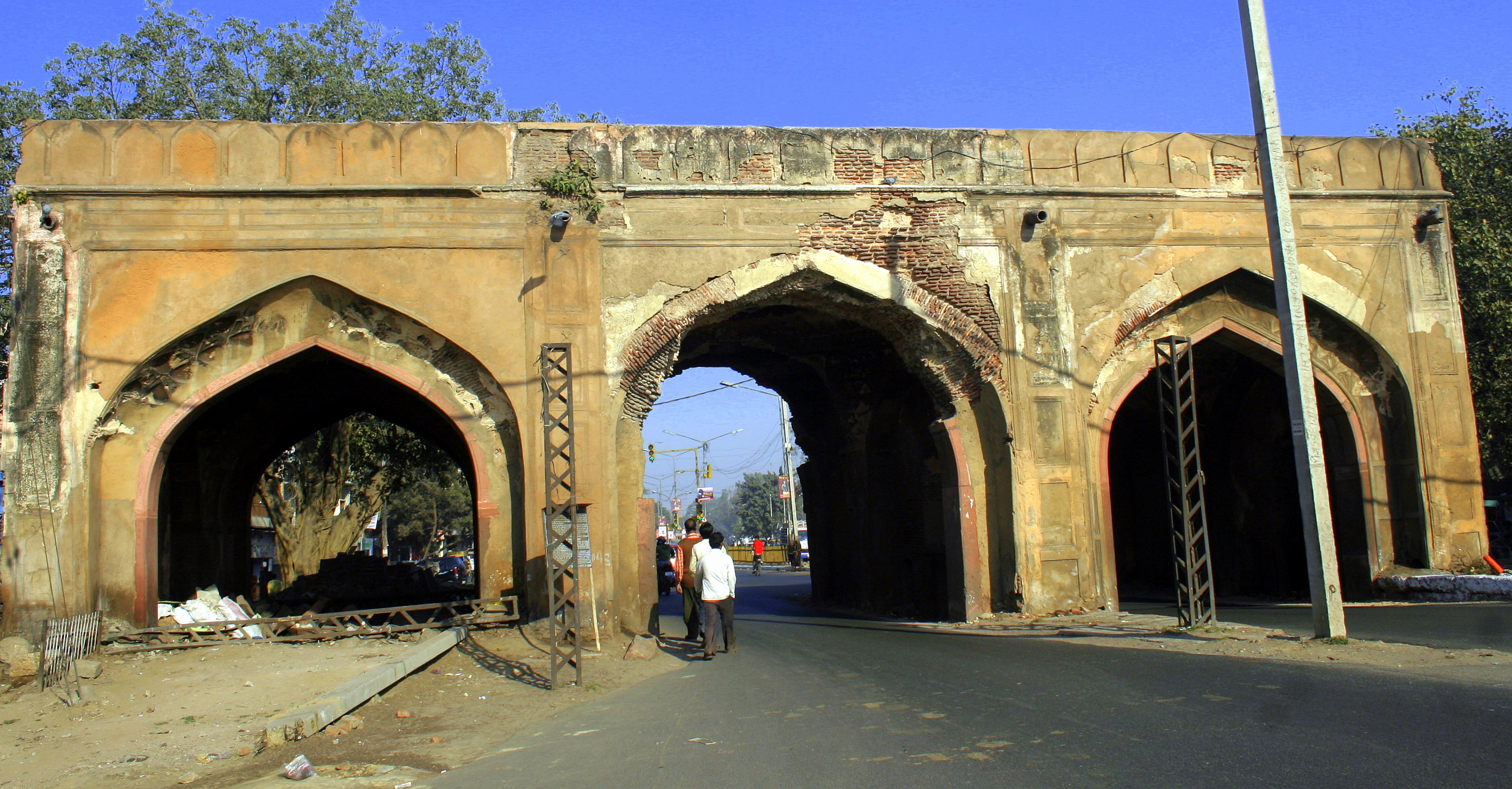
One of the gateways, before restoration

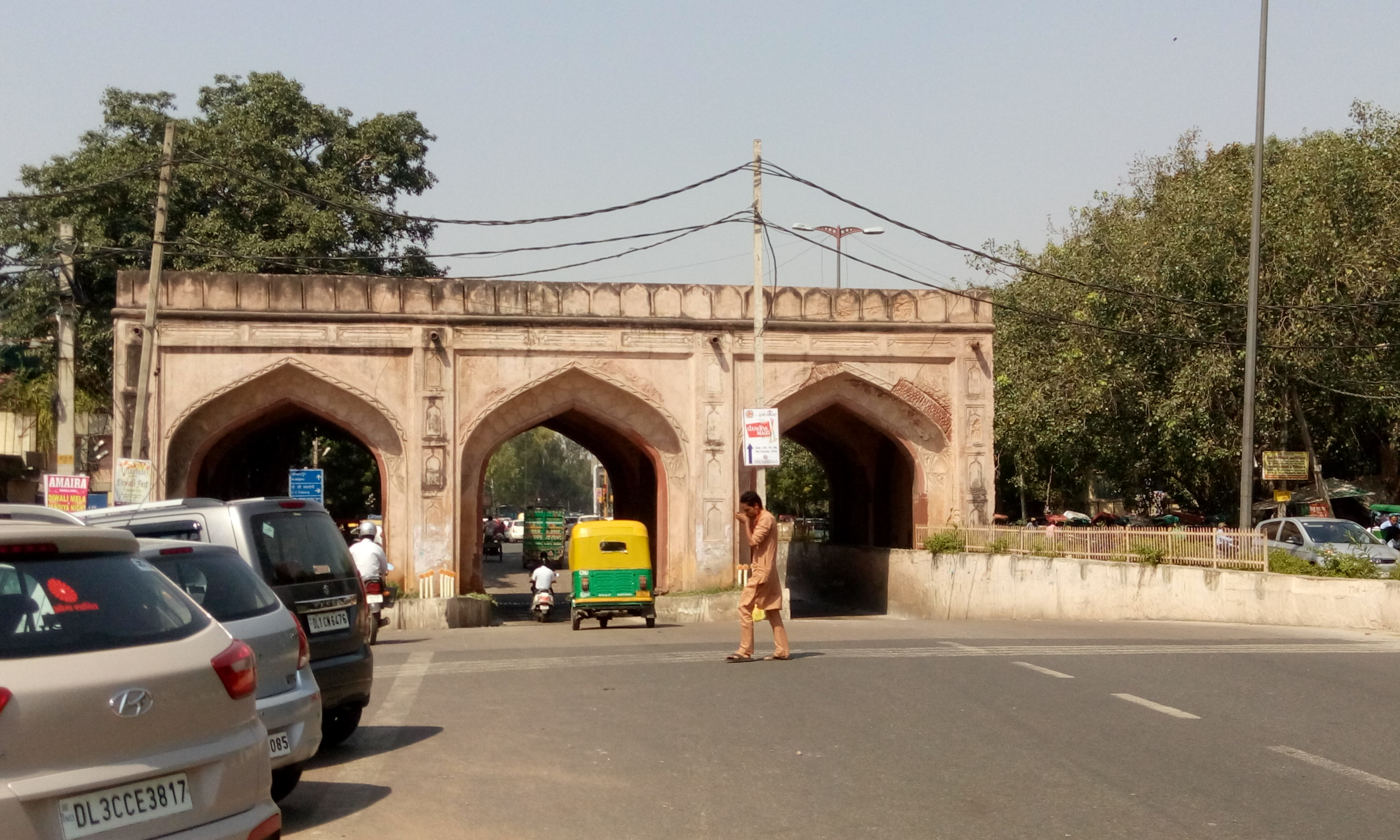
The northern gate - 28.687195°N 77.194243°E

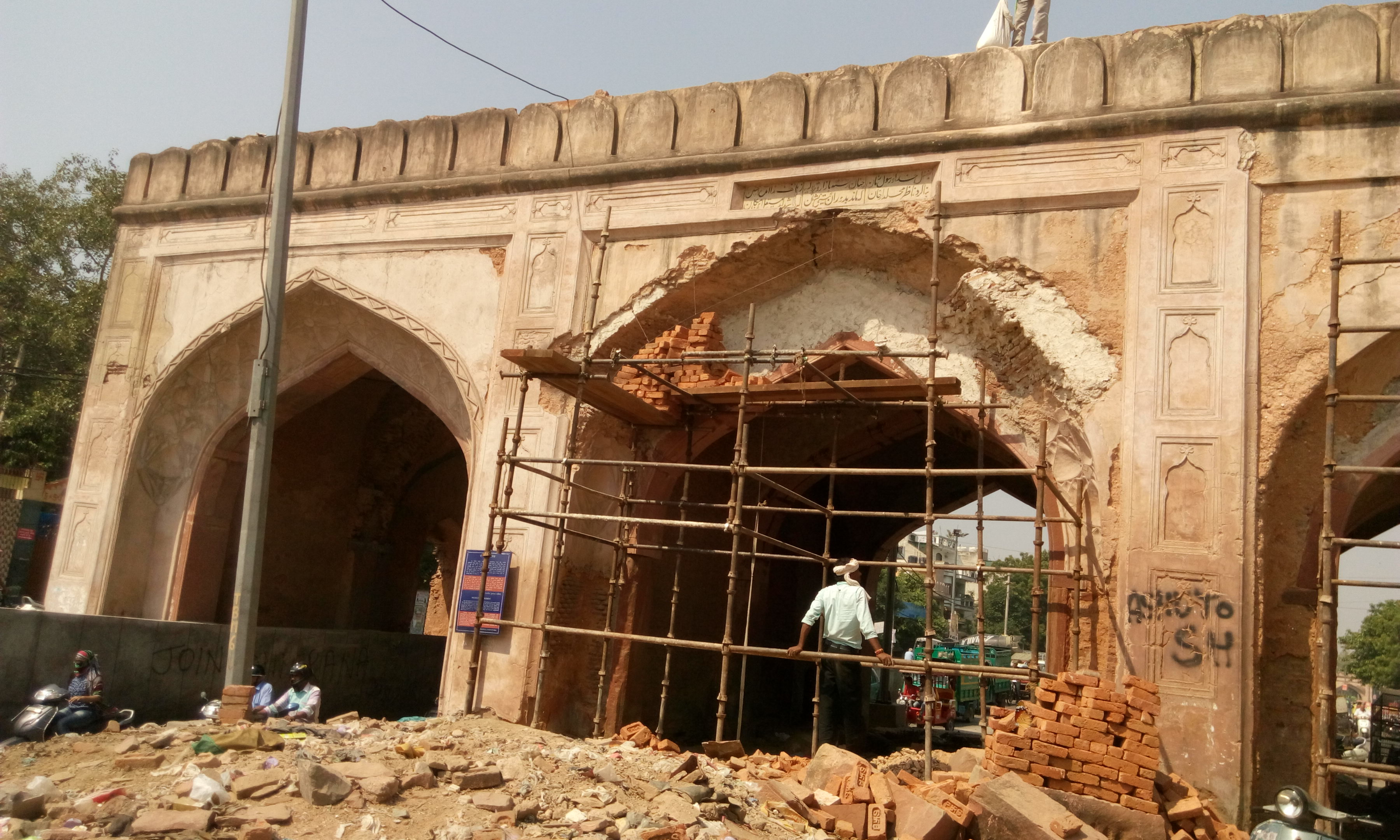
The southern gate under restoration - 28.685346°N 77.195804°E
