= Gurdas Nangal =

Village in Punjab, India

Coordinates: 32°00′07″N 75°20′47″E

Gurdas Nangal is located in Gurdaspur tehsil in Gurdaspur district in the Indian state of Punjab. It is 6 km from the district headquarter Gurdaspur. Gurdas Nangal is also a Gram panchayat. Total population of this village 3,417, out of which 1,767 are males and 1,650 are females.

Pin Code of this village is 143520.

== Education ==
The list of major educational institutions in Gurdas Nangal is given below.

- Baba Ajay Singh Khalsa College
- Government Senior Secondary School, Gurdas Nangal
- Baba Ajay Singh Khalsa Public School
- Government High School, Gurdas Nangal
- Government Primary School, Gurdas Nangal
- New Ligh Public School
