= Names of Patna =

Since its origin in 600 BCE, the city of Patna (Hindi: पटना) has gone through many name changes. The article lists various names of Patna used throughout its history. The article could also be taken as the Toponymy of Patna.

== Pataligram ==
One legend ascribes the origin of the city to a mythological king, Putraka, who created Patna by a magic stroke for his queen Patali, literally trumpet flower, which gives it its ancient name Pataligram. Gram is the Sanskrit word for a village.

== Patliputra ==
The name Patliputra (Devanagari: पाटलिपुत्र ) is composed (sandhi) of two words, Patali and Putraka (king). The name Patliputra was given by Ajatashatru, a king of the ancient Indian state of Magadh, who created a fort in Pataligrama near the River Ganga in 490 BCE and later, King Ajatashatru shifted his capital to Patliputra.

The name Patliputra may also have been derived from Patli, a variety of tree that is found in the city. Indeed, according to the Mahāparinibbāṇa Sutta (Sutta 16 of the Dīgha Nikāya), Pāṭaliputta was the place "where the seedpods of the Pāṭali plant break open".

== Palinfou ==
The Chinese called the place Palinfou. This name appears in books of Chinese travelers Fa Hien & Hsuan-tsang who visited Patliputra.

== Palibothra ==
This name was mentioned by Megasthenes (350 BCE-290 BCE), the Greek historian, (calling it 'Palibothra'(Devanagari: पलिबोथरा) or 'Palimbotra' (Devanagari: पलिम्बोत्र), in his writings during the 4th century.

== Azimabad ==
Prince Azim-us-Shan, the grandson of Aurangzeb became the Governor of Patliputra in 1703. Earlier to that, Sher Shah Suri had moved his capital from Bihar Sharif to Patliputra. It was Prince Azim-us-Shan who gave it the name Azimabad.

== See also ==
- Azimabad
- Magadh
