= Ghulam Hussain Khan =

18th-century Indian historian

Subahdar of Azimabad Ghulam Husain Khan Tabatabai
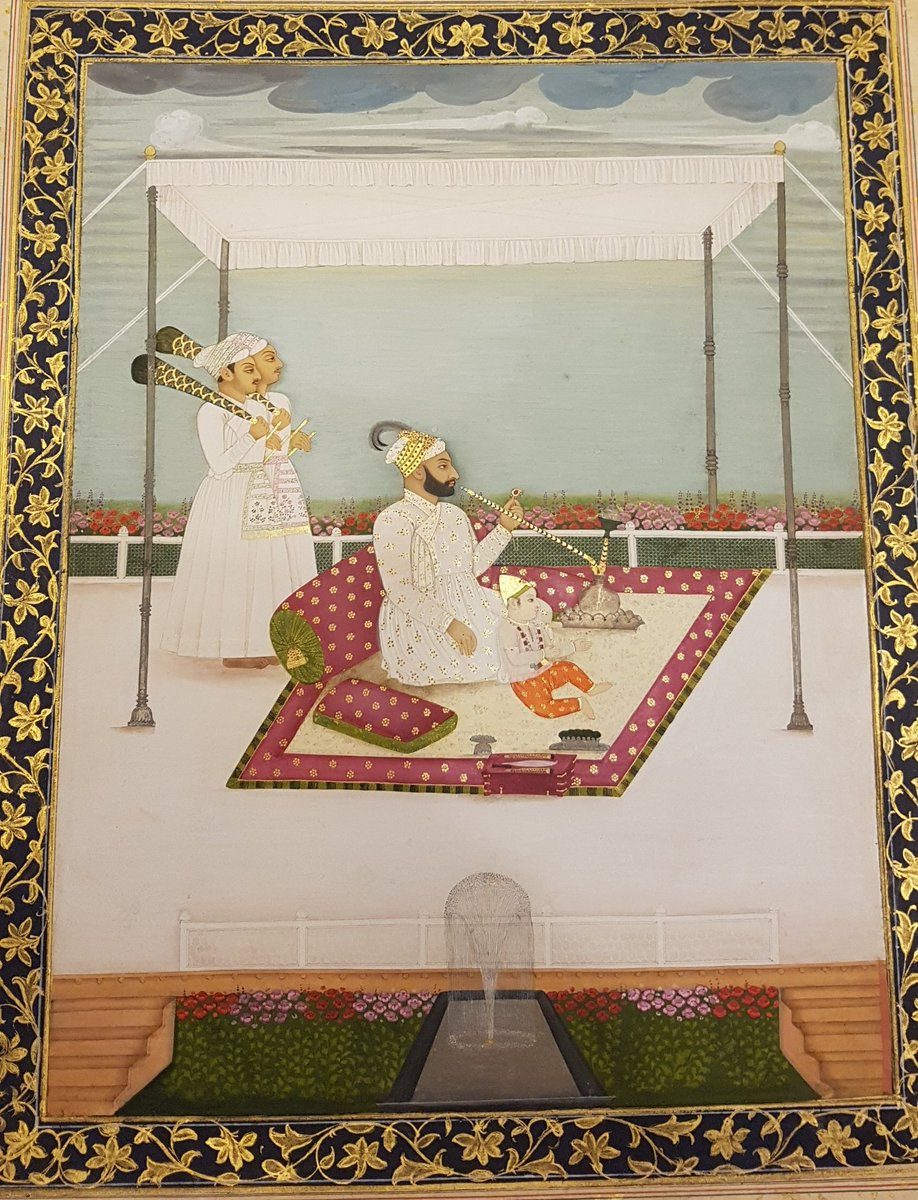
- Portrait of Ghulam Hussain Khan c.1750-1760
- Born: 1727/28; Delhi
- Died: 1797/98 (aged 69-70); Azimabad
- Occupations: Historian, Subahdar, Noble
- Relatives: Alivardi Khan, Siraj-ud-Daulah
- Writing career
- Language: Persian
- Period: 18th century
- Notable work: Seir Mutaqherin

Ghulam Hussain Khan, also known as Ghulam Husain Khan Tabatabai (1727/28–1797/98) was an 18th-century Indian historian and scholar-administrator from Delhi who later settled in Azimabad (Patna). He is the writer of the famous book Seir Mutaqherin (سیر المتاخرین; lit. 'Review of modern times'), one of the notable contemporary historical accounts of the late Mughal Empire.

He is considered to be among a slew of Muslim nobles whose families had left Delhi and settled in Azimabad.

== Life ==
Ghulam Husain's ancestors were originally from Iraq. His father Hidayat Khan accompanied the Nawab of Bengal, Alivardi Khan to Azimabad where he was appointed subadar. Ghulam Hussain Khan left Delhi after Nader Shah's invasion of India and moved to the court of his cousin, Alivardi Khan, the Nawab of Bengal, in Murshidabad. Khan was also related to the next nawab, Siraj ud-Daulah, either through Siraj being Alivardi's grandson or in another way.

Charles W. J. Withers described him as a "high-born Bihari official "whose Persian father had served the Mughal Emperor and whose mother was related to Alivardi Khan."
