= Amrita Bai =

Wife of Emperor Bahadur Shah I

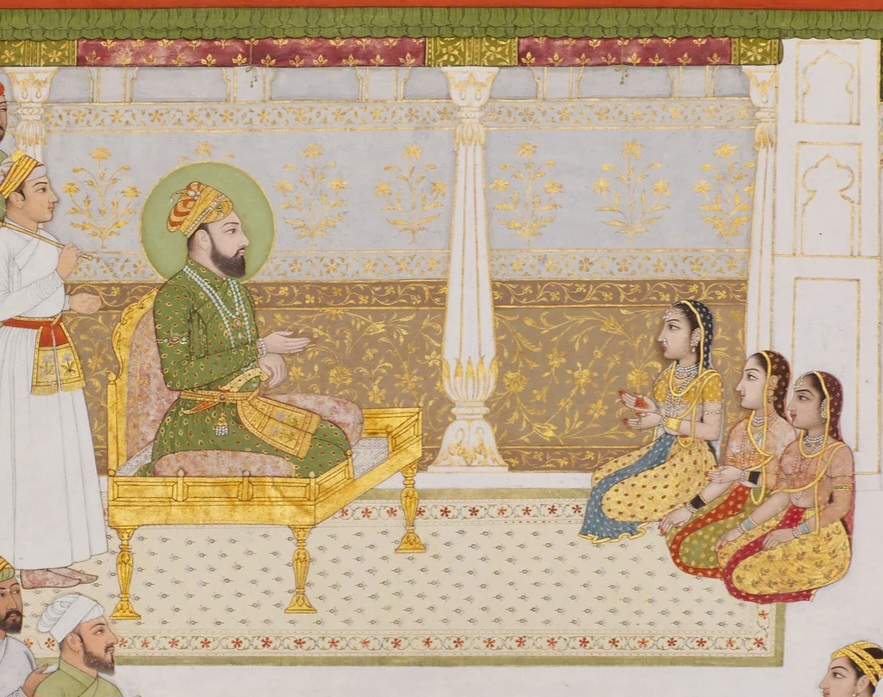
- Likely depiction of Amrita Bai from a painting of Bahadur Shah I being entertained, c.1710
- Born: 17th century Kishangarh, Kishangarh State
- Died: Delhi, Mughal Empire
- Spouse: Bahadur Shah I
- Issue: Azim-ush-Shan, Daulat-Afza
- House: Rathore (by birth) Timurid (by marriage)
- Father: Raja Rup Singh Rathore
- Religion: Hinduism

Amrit Kanwar, better known by her title Amrita Bai, was a consort of Mughal emperor Bahadur Shah I.

== Family ==
By birth, Amrita Bai was a princess of Kishangarh as the daughter of Maharaja Rup Singh of the Rathore clan.

== Marriage ==
Amrita Bai married Bahadur Shah I as part of a political alliance with Kishangarh and entered the imperial harem. The wedding was officiated by the imperial qazi, Abdul Wahhab. Amrita Bai was described as being honest and simple. She was said to possess alertness and reportedly had a great sense of humour, which endeared her to Bahadur Shah and earned her his admiration. Amrita's steadfast devotion and faithfulness gained her significant favour in the imperial harem and she remained the centre of his affection for nearly two decades. She gave birth to two children; Princess Daulat-Afza and Prince Mohammed Azim (Azim-ush-Shan) who she gave birth to in 1664. The favour bestowed upon Amrita Bai and her children made her become the target of envy of the other ladies in the harem.
