= Azim-ush-Shan =

Mughal prince (1664–1712)

- Mirza
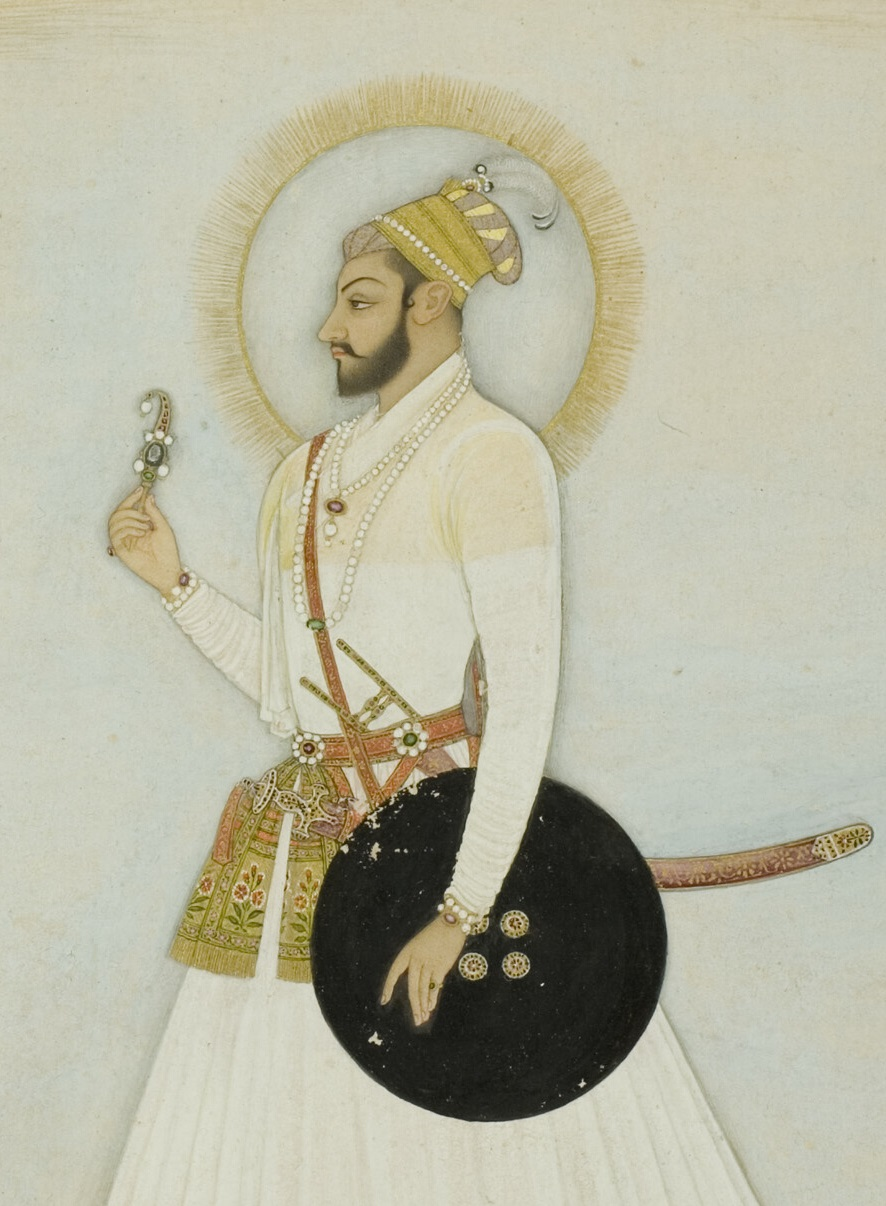
- Azim-ush-Shan holding a jewelled sarpech c. 1710

Subahdar of Bengal
- Reign: 22 September 1697 – 18 March 1712
- Predecessor: Ibrahim Khan II
- Successor: Murshid Quli Khan
- Monarch: Aurangzeb; Azam Shah; Bahadur Shah I
- Born: Muhammad Azim-ud-Din; 15 December 1664; Agra Fort, Agra Subah, Mughal Empire
- Died: 18 March 1712 (aged 47); Ravi River, Kangra, Mughal Empire
- Burial: Humayun's Tomb, Delhi, India
- Spouses: Yash Kanwarji (m. 1678); Aisha Begum (m. 1692; died 1709); Gitti Ara Begum (m. 1709); Sahiba Niswan
- Issue: Muhammad Karim Mirza; Humayun Bakht Mirza; Ruh-ul-Daula Mirza; Ahsanullah Mirza; Farrukhsiyar
Names
- Sultan Azhar-ud-Din Muhammad Azim Mirza Azim-ush-Shan Bahadur
- House: Mughal dynasty
- Dynasty: Timurid dynasty
- Father: Shah Alam I
- Mother: Amrit Kanwar
- Religion: Sunni Islam

Mirza Azim-ush-Shan (15 December 1664 – 18 March 1712) was the second son of the 8th Mughal Emperor Shah Alam I and his wife Amrit Kanwar from the Rathore Dynasty of Kishangarh. He was the great grandson of Shah Jahan and the grandson of Aurangzeb during whose reign he was the imperial subahdar (governor) of Bengal Subah from the year 1697 to his death in 1712.

== Reign ==
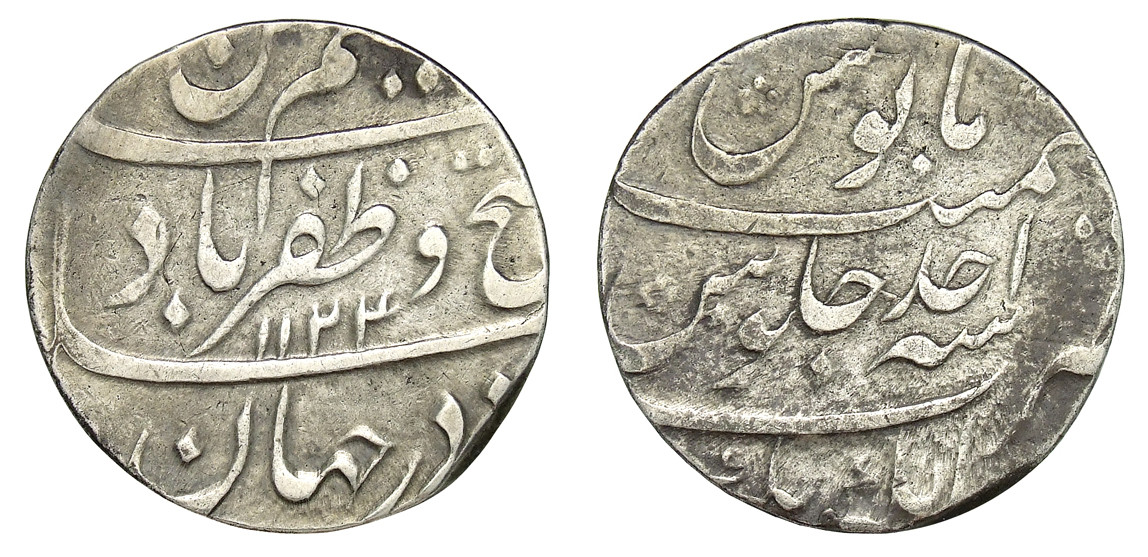
Coin of Azim-us-Shaan

In 1697, Azim-ush-Shan was appointed the viceroy of Bengal Subah, Bihar and Odisha by Emperor Aurangzeb. Shortly afterwards, he took successful military initiative against Rahim Khan. Azim gave the East India Company permission to build Fort William in Calcutta (presently Kolkata) in 1696. Using Mughal permission, the Dutch also built Fort Gustavas in Chinsura and the French built Fort Orleans in Chandernagore (presently Chandannagar).

Azim got into conflict with Murshid Quli Khan, the newly appointed Diwan of Bengal, over imperial financial control. Considering the complaint of Murshid Quli Khan, Aurangzeb ordered Azim to move to Bihar. Murshid Quli Khan later transformed his succession as a semi-independent princely state known as Nawab of Bengal. In 1703, he transferred the capital to Rajmahal and then again to Pataliputra (present-day Patna). He renamed Pataliputra to Azimabad after his own name.

In 1712, at the time of his father's death, he immediately proclaimed himself emperor but the other three princes, Jahandar Shah, Jahan Shah and Rafi-ush-Shan, united and waged war against Azim. In the battle, a shot from a heavy gun struck the trunk of the elephant that Azim was on, leading the elephant to run towards Ravi River and falling into quick sand, which killed both the elephant and Azim.

== Personal life ==
Azim-us-shan's first wife was a Kachhwaha Rajput princess Yash Kanwarji the last of her house to enter the imperial harem, elder daughter of Raja Kirat Singh, who was the second surviving son of Amir-ul-Umara Mirza Raja Jai Singh,the Kachwaha ruler of Amber. She married Azim-ud-din in 1678, and was the mother of Prince Muhammad Karim Mirza born on 12 October 1679. She died at Delhi on 19 February 1721, and was buried at the Qutb.

His second wife was Jahanzeb Banu Begum, known as Sahiba Niswan, a Kashmiri lady, and the sister of Khwajah Inayatullah entitled Shaista Khan. She was the mother of Emperor Farrukhsiyar. Upon Farrukhsiyar's accession on 11 January 1713, she occupied an eminent position in the imperial harem. She died at Delhi in February 1729, having outlived her son for nearly ten years.

His third wife was Aisha Begum, the daughter of Ruhullah Khan Yazdi, the Mir Bakhshi. She was the granddaughter Khalilullah Khan. The marriage took place on 26 June 1692. She was the mother of Prince Humayun Bakht Mirza, and Prince Ruh-ud-daula Mirza. Azim-ush-shan is said to have been very fond of her. On 24 May 1709, she gave birth to twins, a boy and a girl. She died at Daulatabad on 15 July 1709, and was buried there, near the tomb of Burhan ud-din.

His fourth wife was Gitti Ara Begum, the daughter of Prince Muhammad Azam Shah. The marriage took place on 1 November 1709. She died at Delhi on 12 June 1724 at age over forty years.

== Ancestry ==
Ancestors of Azim-ush-Shan

8. Shahab-ud-din Muhammad Shah Jahan I, Mughal Emperor
4. Muhi-ud-din Muhammad Aurangzeb, Mughal Emperor
9. Mumtaz Mahal
2. Qutb-ud-din Muhammad Bahadur Shah I, Mughal Emperor
10. Taj-ud-Din Khan, Raja of Rajauri
5. Nawab Bai Begum
1. Azim-ush-Shan
24. Raja Kishan Singh of Kishangarh
12. Bharmal Rathore of Babera
6. Raja Roop Singh of Kishangarh
3. Amrit Kanwar

== See also ==
- Azimabad, former name of Patna, after prince Azim-ush-Shan
- List of rulers of Bengal
- History of Bihar
- History of Odisha

== Bibliography ==
Irvine, William (1921). Sarkar, Jadunath (ed.). Later Mughals. Vol. I. Calcutta: M. C. Sarkar & Sons.
