= Nawab Haji Syed Ahmad Ali Khan Bahadur of Doolighat =

Nawab Haji Syed Ahmad Ali Khan Bahadur (died 1786 AD) was the first Nawab of Doolighat. He chose "Qayamat" as his pen name and wrote almost 1300 ghazals in Persian.

Nawab Ahmad Ali Khan established Azadari in Azimabad with the foundation of Imambaras at Doolighat and Sangidalan in 1722 AD, as well as Madarsa-i-Deenia (a college at Doolighat) where he continued to teach until his death.

Nawab Ahmad Ali Khan left behind a Diwan in Persian, named Haidernameh. A few of the couplets from this book are mentioned in Tazkerat-al-Akabir by Nawab Nejat Hussain Khan 'Ashki', republished in 'Shoara Ke Tazkire' by Qazi Abdul Wadood.
