= Azimabad =

Former name of Patna during Mughal Empire

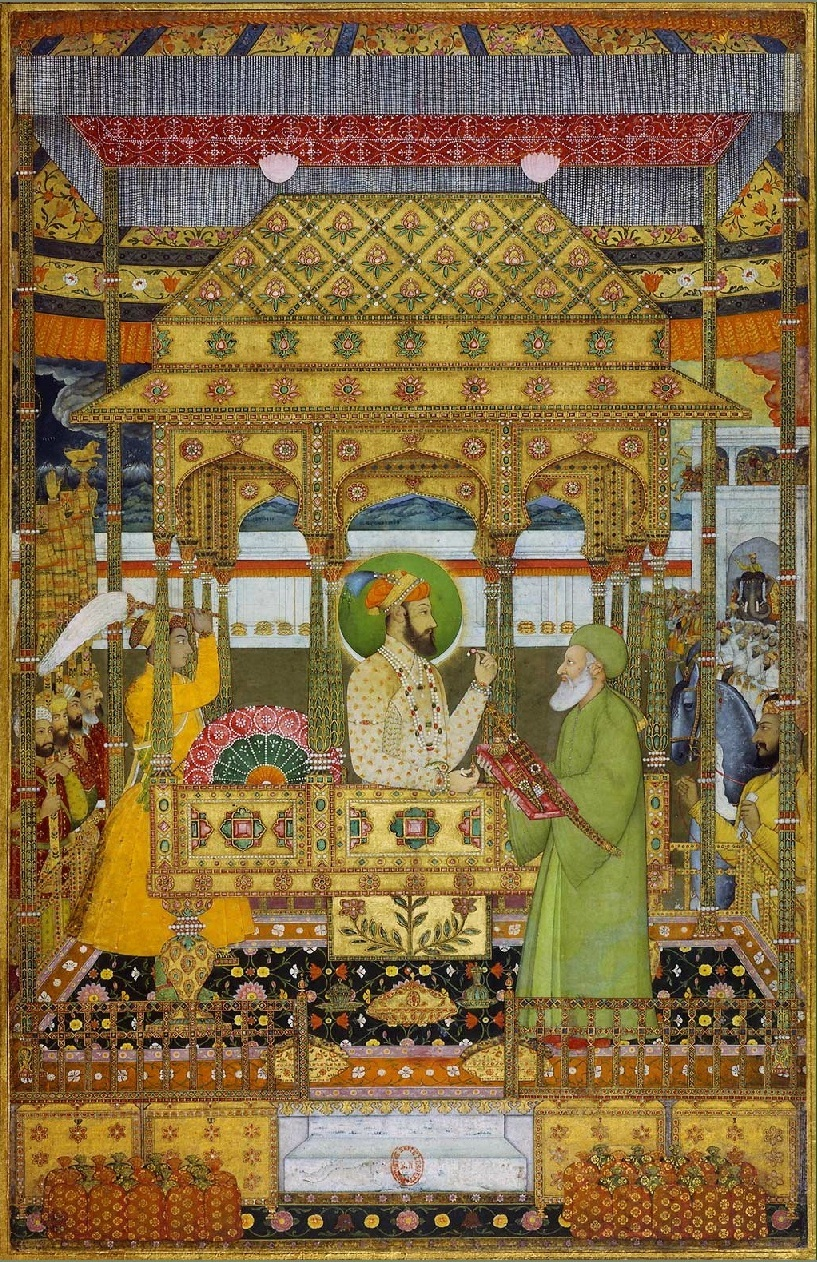
Azim-us-Shan (r. 1697-1712) receiving the investiture of Khizr

Azimabad (Hindi: अज़ीमाबाद, Urdu: عظیم آباد) was the name of modern-day Patna during the eighteenth century, prior to the British Raj. Today, Patna is the capital of Bihar, a state in North India. In ancient times, Patna was known as Pataliputra. This was the capital of the Maurya and Gupta Empires.

Medieval India marked Pataliputra's invasion of Muslim Pashtun Bakhtiyar Khilji and other Muslim rulers. This event is arguably seen by modern historians and scholars as a milestone in the decline of Buddhism in India. Long before Pataliputra was conquered, however, most of the ancient city was abandoned in the seventh century of the Common Era but revived more than 800 years later during the rule of Pashtun emperor Sher Shah Suri as Patna. Sher Shah Suri had moved his capital from Bihar Sharif to Pataliputra. Not long after Sher Shah Suri's death in 1545, Patna and Bihar fell to the Mughals. The name Pataliputra continued to be used, however.

In 1703, Prince Azim-us-Shan, the grandson of Mughal Emperor Aurangzeb came as the Governor of Pataliputra. Azim-us-Shan, renamed Pataliputra as Azimabad, in 1704. Khan Zaman Khan Ali Asghar ibn Qazi Ghulam Mustafa was later on appointed as Naib Subahdar by Farrukhsiyar at Azimabad. The last custodian of Pargenah Haweli Azimabad, was Nawab Haji Syed Ahmad Ali Khan Bahadur of Doolighat, who received it as a jagir, from the then emperor Alamgir II.

Eventually, the name Azimabad fell out of use, and was replaced by Patna, the name Sher Shah Suri opted to call this ancient city. Patna is the most common way of referring to Bihar's capital city from the colonial period onward. Nevertheless, there is a New Azimabad Colony inside Patna today named after Patna that is primarily inhabited by Muslims who were inspired by Patna's Mughal name. Similarly, Pataliputra is understood as part of the modern city Patna, not the whole city itself. Thus, to some extent, while the name "Patna" has replaced and to some extent engulfed Azimabad and Pataliputra, the legacy of these former names during the ancient and early modern exists and will continue to persist for the foreseeable future.

== See also ==
- Names of Patna
- Shad Azimabadi
- Bismil Azimabadi
- Muhammad Shams-ul-Haq Azimabadi
